= Copperbelt =

Mining region in Central Africa

Coordinates: 12°S 28°E

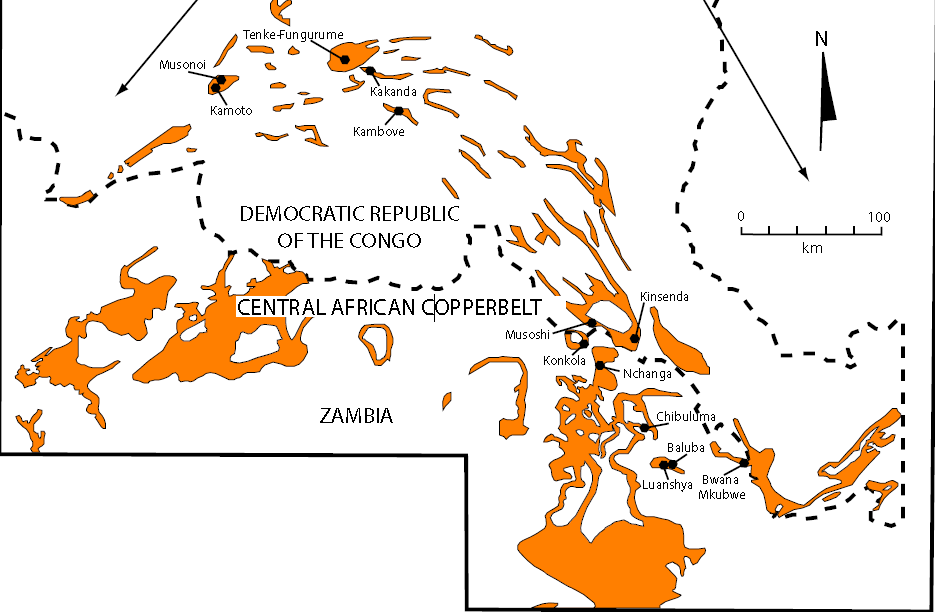
Central African Copper Belt geological map of Katanga Supergroup and mine locations

The Copperbelt (French: ceinture du cuivre) is a natural region in Central Africa which sits on the border region between central-western Zambia and the south eastern Democratic Republic of Congo. It is known for copper mining and is the second largest global reserve of copper, about 1/3 the size of the Chilean reserve.

Traditionally, the term Copperbelt includes the mining regions of Zambia's Copperbelt Province (notably the towns of Ndola, Kitwe, Chingola, Luanshya, and Mufulira in particular) and the Congo's Haut-Katanga and Lualaba provinces (notably Lubumbashi, Kolwezi, and Likasi). It arises because of the Katanga Supergroup, a Neoproterozoic sequence of geological formations.

In some contexts the term Copperbelt may exclude the Congo entirely. Zambia's Copperbelt became a province soon after independence in 1964, when it was named "Western province". President Kenneth Kaunda changed the name to its present-day "Copperbelt province" in 1969. From the time of the Bantu expansion, both the Congo's Katanga and Zambia's Copperbelt regions have been called "Ilamba" or "Lambaland", after the Lamba people. Both provinces are rich in mineral wealth.

== Prehistory ==
The Copperbelt was not inhabited before the arrival of the Lamba people from the Luba and Lunda kingdoms. The Lamba settled at Lake Kashiba, and from there the Lamba kingdom spread eastward, northward, southward and westward.

== History ==
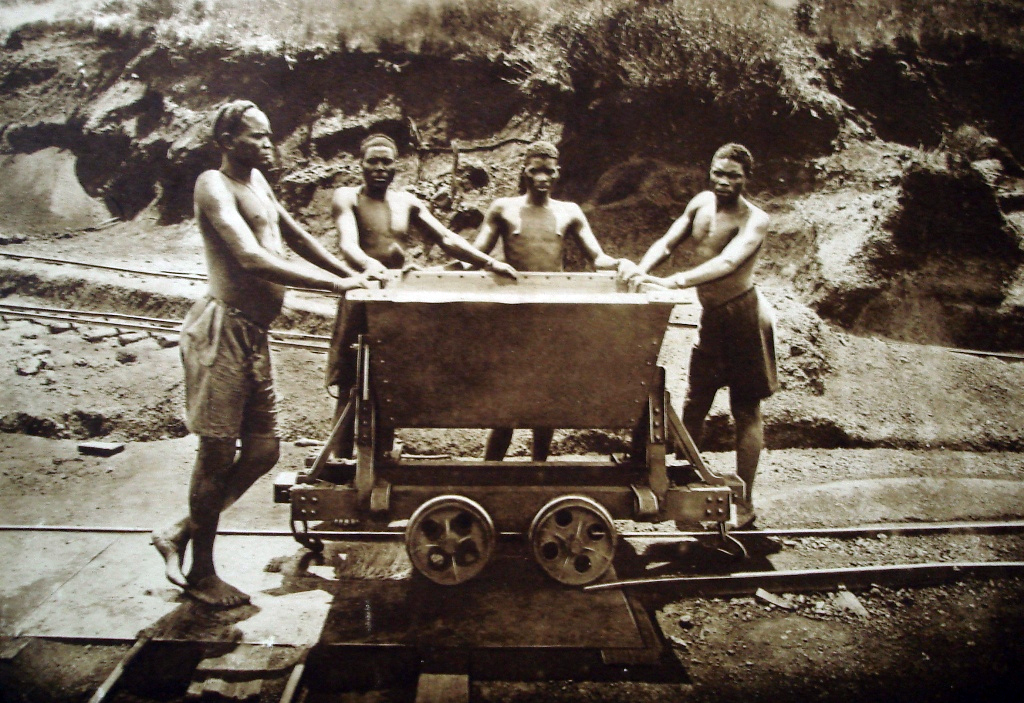
Rwandan migrant workers in a Congolese copper mine, c.1920, during the Belgian colonial period

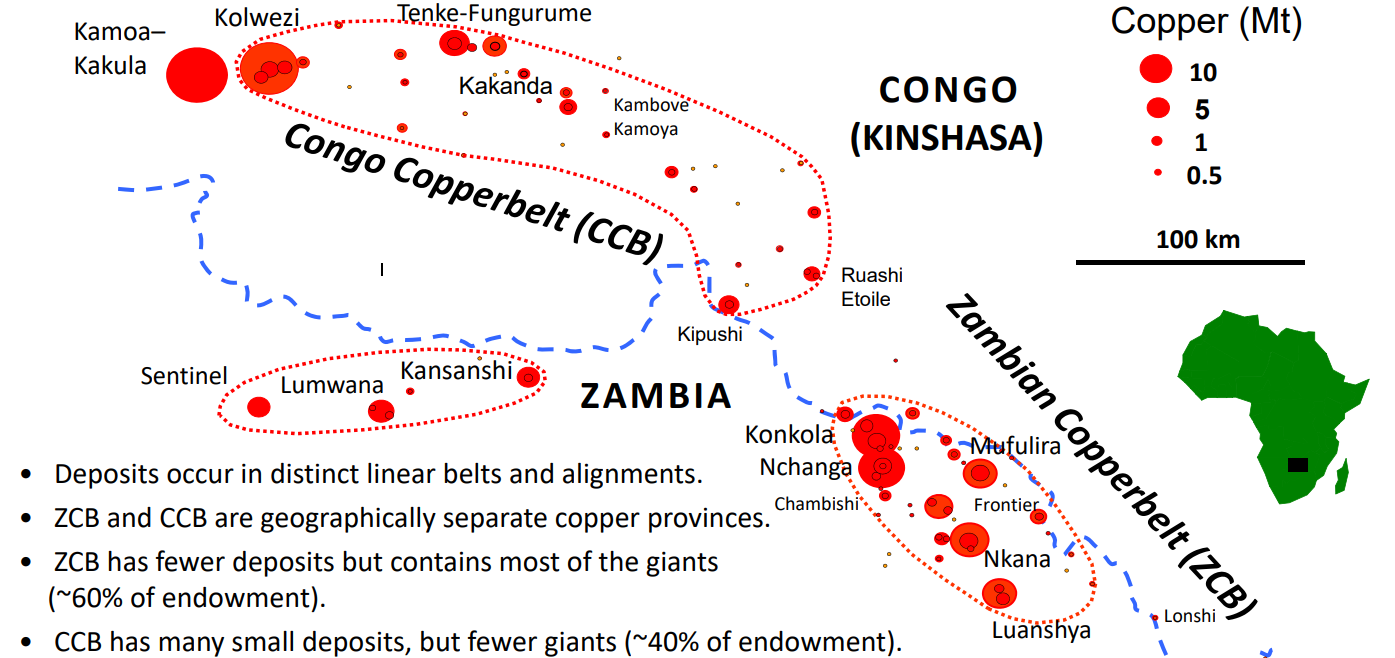
Copperbelt mining centers

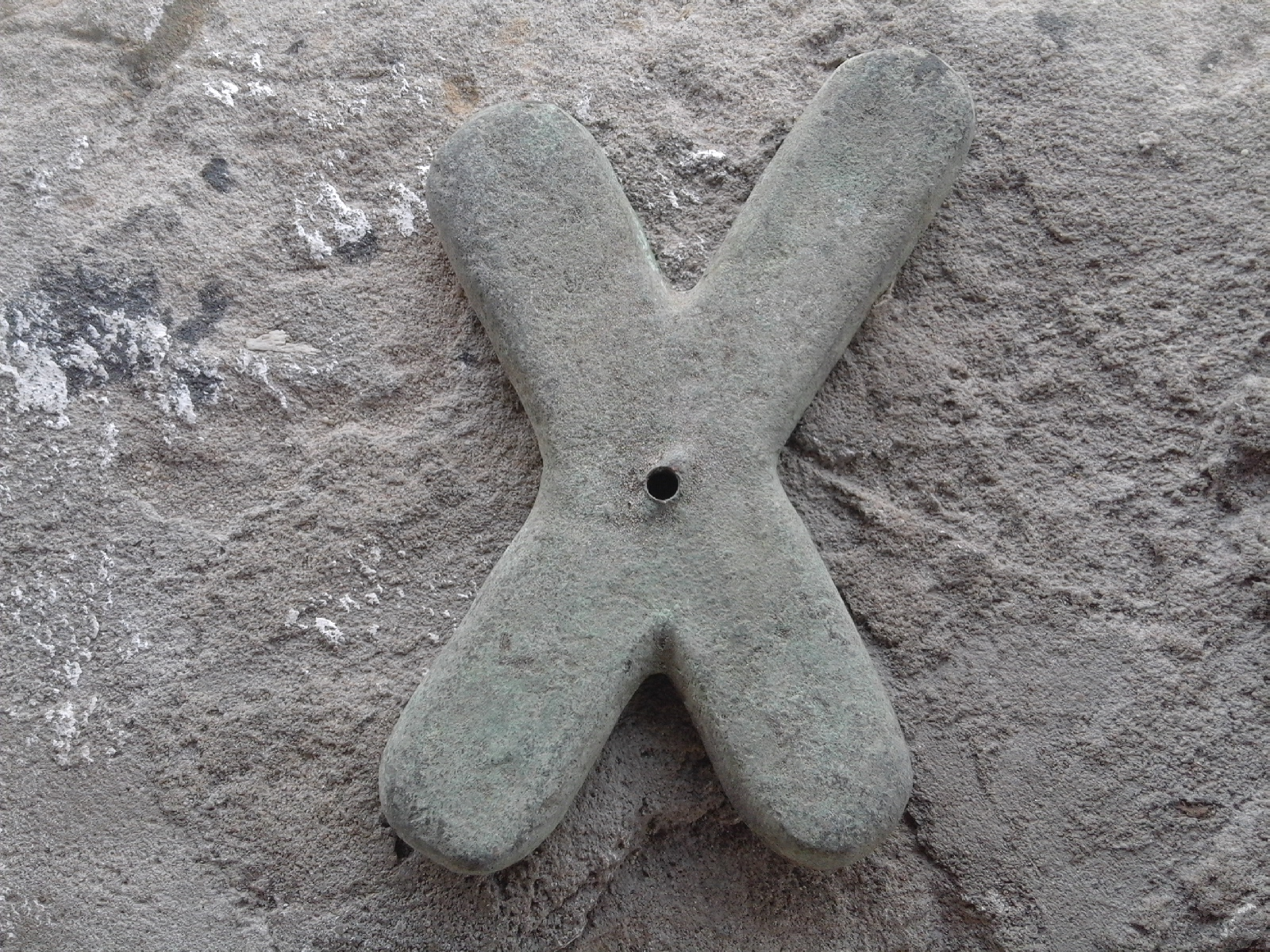
Pre-colonial copper coin from the Katanga Province. These coins forming the Katanga Cross are no longer produced, but those remaining are used symbolically among traditional families for the payment of dowry (along with money and other goods).

The colonial discovery of copper in Zambia is partly due to American scout Frederick Russell Burnham. In 1895 he led the Northern Territories (BSA) Exploration Co. expedition, which determined that major copper deposits existed in Central Africa. Along the Kafue River in then-Northern Rhodesia, Burnham saw many similarities to copper deposits he had worked in the United States, and he encountered natives wearing copper bracelets. In his report to the British South Africa Company Burnham said about the region:

About 200 miles north of the Falls on the Incalla river, and twelve miles from the Kafukwe [now known as the Kafue River] and still on the high plateau is probably one of the greatest copper fields on the continent. The natives have worked this ore for ages, as can be seen by their old dumps, and they work it to-day. The field is very extensive, and reaches away to Katanga... The natives inhabiting this part of the country are skilled workmen, and have traded their handiwork with all comers, even as far afield as the Portuguese of the West Coast and the Arabs of the East. These natives, being miners and workers of copper and iron, and being permanently located in the ground, would give the very element needed in developing these fields.

The increasing use of copper bids fair to make it one of the most valuable products a country can have.... The copper mines of Montana and Arizona have proven of more value than the gold mines, regardless of the fact that the copper had to be hauled two thousand miles by rail to the seaboard, and the coal and coke to smelt it hauled hundreds of miles to the mines. So far as natural difficulties are concerned, this northern field can be fed from the coal deposits of the valley of the Zambezi [Burnham had previously discovered massive coal fields at Hwange], and the product shipped to the East Coast at a less expense than the product of Montana and Arizona can be laid on the dock at New York.

Many years later, the British South Africa Company built towns along the river and a railroad to transport the copper through Mozambique.

During the 1950s, the Copperbelt was the largest copper-producing area in the world, including the Roan Antelope Mine, Nkana Mine, Nchanga Mines, Mufulira Mine, and Rokana Mine.

Chalcopyrite, bornite, and chalcocite are found in the metamorphosed calcareous shales and arkoses of the Lower Roan Formation in the Katanga System.

== Katanga Supergroup ==
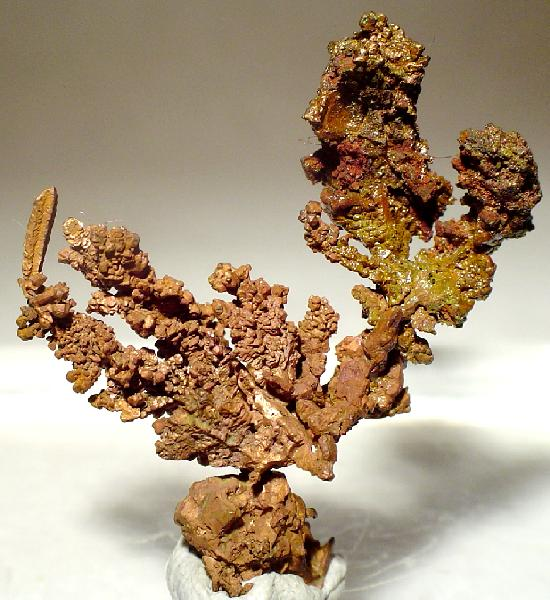
Native copper, Mufulira Mine of the Copperbelt Province of Zambia where the Katanga Supergroup formations are mined for copper

The Katanga Supergroup is a Neoproterozoic sequence of geological formations found in central Africa. The formation is well-studied for its rich stratiform copper-cobalt deposits mined extensively in from the Central African Copperbelt in Zambia and the Democratic Republic of the Congo. Particularly rich outcrops of the Roan Group of the supergroup occur in eastern Katanga Province of the Democratic Republic of the Congo where open-pit copper mining has occurred.

The Katanga Supergroup nonconformably overlies the 883 Ma Nchanga Granite. The Katangan Supergroup is divided into four metasedimentary series, from the oldest siliclastic and dolomitic Roan Group conglomerates, sandstones, and shales, to Nguba Group of mostly carbonates and carbon-rich shales, to the youngest, upper most Kundelungu Group including glacial metasediments and a cap carbonate.

The Katanga Supergroup correlates with rocks of the Makuti Group in other parts of the DR Congo.

== Mines of the Katanga Supergroup ==
- DR Congo
  - Dikulushi Mine
  - Dikuluwe Mine
  - Etoile Mine
  - Frontier Mine, Katanga
  - Kalukundi Mine
  - Kalumines
  - Kambove mines
  - Kamfundwa Mine
  - Kamoto Mine
  - Kananga Mine
  - Kinsenda Mine
  - Kinsevere
  - Kipoi Mine
  - Kipushi Mine
  - Kolwezi Mine
  - Lonshi Mine
  - Luishia Mine
  - Luiswishi Mine
  - Luita
  - Mashamba East
  - Mukondo Mine
  - Musonoi Mine
  - Musoshi Mine
  - Mutanda Mine
  - Mutoshi Mine
  - Pumpi Mine
  - Ruashi Mine
  - Sase prospect
  - Shituru
  - Tilwezembe
- Zambia
  - Chambishi mine
  - Lumwana mine
  - Mingomba Mine
  - Mufulira Mine
  - Nkana Mine
  - Konkola Copper Mines
  - Kansanshi Mine
  - Sentinel mine
  - Lumwana mine

== See also ==
- Copperbelt Province
- Anvil Mining
- Domeyko Fault
- Glencore
- Camrose Resources Limited
- Union Minière du Haut Katanga (UMHK)
- Xstrata
- Sir Robert Williams, 1st Baronet, of Park
