= Lupoto Mine =

Lupoto Mine may refer to

- Lupoto Mine (north), a copper mine in Katanga, DRC being developed by Tiger Resources
- Lupoto Mine (Kalumines), a copper mine in Katanga, DRC being developed by TEAL
