= Mutshatsha =

Mutshatsha may refer to:

- Mutshatsha, Katanga
- Mutshatsha Territory
