= Deziwa mine =

Mine in Lualaba, Democratic Republic of the Congo

- Location within Democratic Republic of the Congo
- Location: Lualaba, Democratic Republic of the Congo; 10°47′36″S 25°46′54″E
- Products: Copper; Cobalt
- Opened: 2020
- Company: China Nonferrous Metal Mining Group (51%); Gécamines (49%)
- Website: www.somidez.com

The Deziwa mine is a large open-pit copper and cobalt mine located about 35 km east of Kolwezi in Lualaba Province in the Democratic Republic of the Congo. The mine is estimated to hold 4.6 million tonnes of copper and 420,000 tonnes of cobalt. The mine sits directly adjacent to the Mutanda Mine.

== History ==
=== Copperbelt minerals ===
An initial agreement was struck in 2005 between Gécamines and Platmin Congo (a subsidiary of Copperbelt Minerals) to explore Deziwa. The joint venture, Societe Minere de Deziwa et Ecaille C Sprl (Somidec) was owned 68% by Copperbelt minerals, and 32% by Gecamines.

In 2010, Zijin Mining made a $284 million bid to purchase the Deziwa and Ecaille C mines from Platmin Congo. The bid was rejected by the Congolese government, who said the deal violated regulations.

=== Gécamines ===
In 2013, Gécamines purchased Copperbelt Minerals' 68% stake in Deziwa and Ecaille C. The purchase was financed by a $196 million loan from Dan Gertler's Fleurette Group.

=== CNMC ===
In 2015, CNMC announced their intention to develop the site in the wake of China's Made in China 2025 policy. Negotiations to develop the mine at Deziwa were taking place in 2016. Construction started in May 2018, and the mine officially opened in January 2020.

The mine is currently run by Société Miniere De Deziwa (Somidez), a joint venture between the China Nonferrous Metal Mining Group (51%) and Gécamines (49%). After a certain number of years, ownership of the mine is set to revert to Gécamines.

The $800 million deal to set up the mine has been criticized as opaque by the UK-based NGO Global Witness. A 2021 report from the UK-based NGO RAID claimed regular violations of workers' rights at the mine.
