= Luiswishi Mine =

Copper and Cobalt mine in the Democratic Republic of the Congo

Luiswishi mine
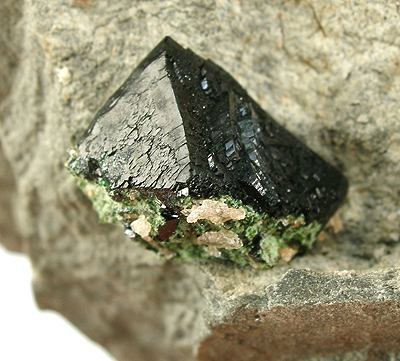
- A 1.5 cm, highly lustrous, dark green libethenite crystal from the Luiswishi Mine.

- Location within Democratic Republic of the Congo
- Location: Haut-Katanga, Democratic Republic of the Congo; 11°30′55″S 27°26′21″E
- Products: Copper, Cobalt
- Company: Zhejiang Huayou Cobalt

The Luiswishi mine is an open cut copper and cobalt mine in Katanga Province of the Democratic Republic of the Congo (DRC).

== Early years ==
Luiswishi was one of the first copper and cobalt mines to be exploited in Katanga by Belgium, opened around 1900. Production came to an end in 1962. In 1980 the state-controlled Gécamines started fresh prospecting, but abandoned the project due to budgetary problems. In 1998 Gécamines signed a contract with a subsidiary of Groupe Forrest International to re-open the mine. Resources were estimated at between 7.5 and 8 million tons of ore graded 2.8% copper and 1.0% cobalt.

== Later operations ==
As of 2002, the Mine was estimated to have a production capacity of about 4,500 tonnes per year of cobalt in concentrates. A joint venture between Gécamines and l'Enterprise Générale Malta Forrest was producing copper-cobalt concentrates from the mine, exported to OM Group's Kokkola refinery in Finland under a long-term supply contract. In November 2002, Forrest announced that the mine would close for an indefinite period of time for a complete refurbishment and to make improvements to the flotation plant, which had been in continuous operation for 5 years. The mine reopened in April 2003 and quickly resumed full production. In December 2008 the mine closed again due to low cobalt prices.

Compagnie Miniere du Sud Katanga (CMSK) operates the mine, owned 60% by Enterprise Générale Malta Forrest, a subsidiary of Groupe Forrest International and 40% by Gécamines. CMSK was formed in January 2004 and owns the rights to Luiswishi mine and also to Luishia Mine, inactive as of 2011. The ore is concentrated in CMSK's plant at Kinpushi before being shipped abroad for processing. CMSK employs about 300 people directly, and another 350 serve as contractors. CMSK produces 12,000 tons of copper annually and about 4,000 tons of cobalt. This is about 8% of world cobalt production.

== Alleged safety issues ==
Leaked diplomatic cables caused allegations that US officials were ignoring reports of dangerously high levels of radiation at Luiswishi mine, and implied that uranium was being separated from the ore which purportedly held only copper and cobalt. Groupe Forrest International refuted rumors of radiation or illegal trading in uranium. Forrest noted that although uranium was present in the copper and cobalt ore from the mine, it was at far too low a grade to be exploited. Forrest also said the radioactivity in the Luiswishi mine was largely lower than the European standards. DRC government officials and United Nations personnel had visited the mine and found no problems.

== Recent changes ==
In October 2012, Forrest sold its shares in the mine back to Gécamines. In 2015, Zhejiang Huayou Cobalt bought the mine, and constructed two refineries in the area.
