= Mutanda mine =

Copper mine in Democratic Republic of Congo

Mutanda Mine Mine de Mutanda
- Location within Democratic Republic of the Congo
- Location: Lualaba, Democratic Republic of the Congo; 10°47′09″S 25°48′30″E
- Production: Copper: 199,000 t (2018); Cobalt: 27,300 t (2018)
- Company: Glencore (100%)

The Mutanda Mine (French: Mine de Mutanda) is an open-pit copper and cobalt mine in the Lualaba Province of the Democratic Republic of the Congo (DRC). It is the largest cobalt mine in the world. Accidents and spills at the mine have killed workers and polluted nearby rivers and fields. An NGO that has documented impacts of the mine concluded that spills have threatened community members' right to food.

The complex contains two mines, the main Mutanda mine and the Shabara mine, where artisanal mining (digging by hand) takes place.

The mine is owned by Glencore. Acquisition and operation of the mine has been fraught with corruption, secrecy, and improper business dealings.

Mutanda has been closed since November 2019, although artisinal mining has continued at Shabara. Glencore announced plans to resume production in 2022. In April 2022, president Félix Tshisekedi's administration announced plans to renegotiate rights and royalties to the mine as it was poised to reopen.

== Background ==
Katanga province is a geologic anomaly with rich copper deposits that are part of the Central African Copper Belt. Katanga produced 522,130 tonnes of copper and 101,000 tonnes of cobalt in 2012. About half of the global proven cobalt reserves are in the Democratic Republic of the Congo (DRC), and over half of the cobalt extracted in 2017 came from the DRC.

Globally, most cobalt is used to manufacture lithium-ion batteries. Some estimates indicate a 5000% increase in electric vehicle manufacture between 2016 and 2030 to meet CO_{2} emission targets in the Paris Agreement. This has created a mining boom for cobalt, copper, and other minerals critical for manufacture of electric vehicle batteries.

=== Location ===
The Mutanda Mine lies about 40 kilometres (25 mi) to the southeast of Kolwezi in the Roan formation. The Deziwa mine is directly east, and the Kalumbwe Myunga mine directly to the west. The property is also close to national road number 39 and the Benguela railway.

The Kando River runs about 2.5 kilometres (1.6 mi) from the southern boundary. There is grid electricity, and a 13.5MW standby generator.

=== Criticism of DRC mining industry ===
In the DRC, people living around these mines do not receive many benefits from this immense mineral wealth. In 2009, the UN Development Programme reported a 70% poverty rate in the former Katanga province (where Mutanda mine is located), and 80% of people lacked drinking water or electricity.

Non-government organisations and media reports have found that artisanal mining in the DRC is plagued with safety and health problems, human rights violations, and child labor. Artisanal mining is a way that people in extreme poverty meet their basic needs. Workers at Shabara mine report that they can make $200/week when most people live on less than $2/day.

Large-scale industrial mining in the DRC has also been critiqued for its corruption, perpetuation of poverty, and violence.

== Resources and production ==
In 2011, the mine produced over 63,700 tonnes of copper and over 7,900 tonnes of cobalt.

The mine produced 199,000 tonnes of copper and 27,300 tonnes of cobalt in 2018.

=== Facilities ===
Facilities include a dense media separation concentrator and a hydrometallurgical plant for crushing, screening, milling, pre-leaching, leaching, clarification and SX/EW. In November 2011 Glencore announced intentions to expand annual capacity to 110,000 metric tons of copper metal. Glencore made an investment of $650 million to develop this capacity.

=== Shabara ===
Just north of the main Mutanda deposit is the Shabara open pit mine. Shabara lies within the exploitation area held by Mutanda Mining Sarl (MUMI), where artisanal mining is illegal. Shabara is run by the artisanal mining cooperative COMAKAT, who signed an agreement in 2010 with the previous majority owners of the Mutanda, the Dino Steel subsidiary of Groupe Bazano, allowing COMAKAT to exploit the pit. About 20,000 people work at Shabara.

== Impact ==
At the end of 2010 MUMI was employing 930 people.

=== Spills ===
Bread for all and Catholic Lenten Fund, an NGO that has written several reports documenting environmental justice impacts of mining in the province, concluded that frequent chemical spills near Mutanda mine and the Kamoto Copper Company facilities have negatively impacted community members' right to food.

Twenty-six farmers’ fields were destroyed between 2013 and 2014, totaling 23.85 hectares of land. These farmers' harvests were ruined, including cassava, maize, rice, bean, pineapple and banana crops. The damage was severe enough to be observable in satellite images. Mutanda Mining (MUMI) initially denied that it had caused the damage, but after the Legal Aid Centre (CAJJ) investigated the damage and alerted authorities they agreed to $65,330 in compensation for crop losses to be shared among the farmers. The farmers did not receive compensation for the land, which is now unusable. Article 281 of the Mining Code requires Glencore to compensate for “any modification rendering the land unfit for cultivation”.

In 2014–2015, an acidic water retention pond spilled into the Kando River. In 2017, another acid spill contaminated nearby fields.

In 2017, a spill damaged farmers' fields, and Glencore refused to pay damages or to publish its reports detailing the nature of the spill. They reported that the spill was "a mixed solution of residue sludge composed of 50% solids". A woman who was sickened by the spill has also been refused compensation for medical bills, although the case was pending in 2018.

Twenty people were killed when a truck carrying acid overturned in February 2019.

== Ownership ==
Glencore acquired its initial 30% stake in the mine in June 2007 from Groupe Bazano.

=== Secret sales of state assets ===
By 2011, Glencore operated the mine and had a 40% stake through a 50% holding in Samref Congo Sprl, which in turn held 80% of Mutanda, with the state-owned Gécamines holding the other 20%. In 2011, Gécamines sold its shares to Rowny Assets Limited, a company associated with Israeli billionaire Dan Gertler. Reports found that contracts for this sale were kept secret, and that Mutanda and other state-owned mines were sold below market value. In September 2011 the International Monetary Fund asked state-owned mining companies Sodimico and Gécamines for explanations of these secret sales of assets below market value. At the time, the IMF was providing loans to the DRC worth $561 million to improve the economy. The 20% share of Mutanda was sold for $120 million - $137 million, while market value was estimated $600 million - $849 million.

=== Further acquisition by Glencore ===
Glencore also indirectly owns 37.5% of Kansuki, a copper and cobalt project bordering Mutanda covering 185 square kilometres (71 sq mi). In August 2011 Glencore's CEO said the company planned to combine the two properties and to increase its share to over 50%.

In 2012, Glencore paid $340 million and took on $140 million in debt to increase its share of Samref Overseas from 50% to 74.49%, and for a 1% stake in Samref Congo. This brought their effective stake in Mutanda to about 60%, and left a remaining 25.5% portion of Samref Overseas still held by High Grade Minerals, which Glencore had set up a deal to acquire in December 2013 for $430 million.

In 2017, Glencore paid $534 million to buy a 31% stake in Mutanda from Dan Gertler's Fleurette group. This deal valued the 31% stake at $922 million, since it also involved the settlement of several hundred million dollars of loans Fleurrette owed to Glencore. Glencore now claims 100% ownership of the Mutanda mine.

=== Lawsuits ===
In 2017, a Swiss watchdog organisation Public Eye filed a criminal complaint against Glencore following revelations in the Paradise Papers indicating that Glencore had loaned $45 million in shares to billionaire Dan Gertler in exchange for help securing an agreement with Gecamines to acquire Mutanda mine.

In 2018, a Congolese-American businessman Charles Brown filed a lawsuit in Congolese court, claiming that he sold a 19.12% stake in Mutanda to Groupe Bazano under threat of violence on May 9, 2012. Glencore purchased Groupe Bazano's share in the mine two weeks later on May 22. Glencore denied this, saying Brown's stake was sold in 2004 and 2005.

In May 2022, Glencore admitted to bribing government officials in several African countries including the DRC to secure "improper business advantages". In December, 2022 the company agreed to pay $180 million to the DRC to settle "all present and future claims arising from any alleged acts of corruption" during the period from 2007 to 2018.
