= Musoshi mine =

Musoshi Mine
- Location within Democratic Republic of the Congo
- Location: Haut-Katanga, Democratic Republic of the Congo; 12°16′12″S 27°43′33″E
- Products: Copper

The Musoshi Mine is an underground copper mine in the Katanga Province of the Democratic Republic of the Congo. The mineral rights are owned by the South African miner Metorex.

== Resource ==
The Musoshi ore body is the northern extension into the DRC of the Zambian Konkola North ore body. It is located 1.5 kilometres (0.93 mi) to the north west of Kasumbalesa. It is a typical "Ore Shale" deposit, hosted in a fine-grained siltstone / argillaceous sandstone. The ore body dips steeply in the upper levels. It thins to the east and west to widths of 4 metres (13 ft) to 6 metres (20 ft).

== Early operations ==
A Japanese consortium, led by Nihon Kogyo Company, operated the mine from 1968 to 1983. They developed a 475 metres (1,558 ft) vertical mine shaft as well as underground workings and ground-level infrastructure. A surface-level concentrator had a capacity of 1.5 million tonnes per year. At its peak, in 1976 the mine produced 1.67 million tonnes of ore graded at 2.5% copper, equivalent to 38,000 tonnes of finished copper. The concentrator was also used to process ore from the Kinsenda Mine, 20 kilometres (12 mi) away.

The mine was closed and the concentrator placed on care-and-maintenance in the early 1990s due to low copper prices and lack of accessible resources. After strike action by the labor union the concentrator was mothballed and the mine allowed to flood. Musoshi has an inferred resource below the lowest working level of 24 million tons at 2.4% copper, or 576,000 tons of contained copper.

== Recent activity ==
In 2007, Metorex acquired 38.7% of Copper Resources Corporation from the Forrest Group, as well as 5% of Miniere de Mushoshi et Kinsenda (MMK). After completing the acquisition and reopening Musoshi mine, it was expected to produce up to 12,000 tonnes annually. Due to a Title Revisitation Process initiated by the DRC government, in February 2009, it was confirmed that the Musoshi mine would be returned to the state-owned Sodimico. In October 2010 a South Korean consortium of Taejoo Synthesis Steel, Samsung, Hyundai and Daewoo said it was willing to revive the Musoshi mine.
