= Afrimines Resources =

Congolese mining company

- Company type: Private company
- Industry: Mining
- Founded: 2003; 23 years ago
- Headquarters: Watsa, Haut-Uélé, Democratic Republic of the Congo
- Area served: Democratic Republic of the Congo
- Products: Precious metals
- Subsidiaries: Regal Sud Kivu

Afrimines Resources is a Congolese mining company based in the Democratic Republic of the Congo that has precious metal mining rights in various deposits. One is a 5,500 square kilometres (2,100 sq mi) area within the Kilo Moto area of the northeastern provinces of Haut-Uélé and Ituri.

== History ==
The company was established in 2003.

In May 2008 the Australian-based Tiger Resources announced that it had secured the right to a 60% interest in four permits for exploration covering about 165 square kilometres (64 sq mi) in the copper and cobalt "“Roan Sequence" in Katanga Province. Afrimines would hold 20% and Katanga Minerals Holdings would hold 20%. Development costs were to be 90% covered by Tiger Resources and 10% by Afrimines.

On 1 December 2010 the Australian Erongo Energy announced it had agreed to purchase a 70% interest from Afrimines Resources in a group of nine tenements covering 1,800 square kilometres (690 sq mi) in the Maniema Province. The tenements are in the same geological zone as Banro Corporation's gold mines.

In April 2011 Regal Resources of Australia announced that it had acquired a 70% interest from Afrimines in a 3,650 square kilometres (1,410 sq mi) group of gold-bearing properties in South Kivu. The properties were located between two gold discoveries by Banro Corporation. The properties had extensive alluvial workings by artisanal miners.

In 2016, Canadian Monument Mining entered a joint venture with Afrimines Resources to earn up to 90% interest in the Matala Gold Project.
