= George Arthur Forrest =

Belgian entrepreneur (born 1940)

- Born: 1941 (age 84–85); Élisabethville, Belgian Congo (now Lubumbashi, Katanga, DRC)
- Occupation: Entrepreneur
- Known for: Owner of Forrest Group

George Arthur Forrest (born 1940) is a Belgian entrepreneur, owner of the Forrest Group (Groupe Forrest), a group of companies founded in the Belgian Congo in 1922 and active in wind power and hydroelectric energy, construction, mines and metallurgy, biological food and aviation.

== Background ==
George Arthur Forrest was born in 1940 in Lubumbashi in what is now the Democratic Republic of the Congo (DRC). He was the son of an Irish immigrant. His father, Malta Forrest, had founded l'Entreprise Générale Malta Forrest (EGMF) in 1922 in Katanga Province in the south of the Belgian Congo. The company started as a transport company, then moved into mining and then into civil engineering. In 1968 it became a limited liability company, with George Forrest and his adoptive brother Victor Eskenazi-Forrest as Managing Directors. In 1986, after his brother died, George Forrest took full control. He created the George Forrest International Group in 1995.

In the early 2000s his company acquired several major cement production facilities, which should benefit from construction demand with the end of the Second Congo War in 2003. Forrest's DRC operations grew to include 9,500 direct employees and 15,000 subcontractors. Forrest is a sponsor of Dialogues, a non-profit association that promotes the visual arts in Lubumbashi and supports the city’s museum. He also owns the Grelka Biano Ranch, with 30,000 head of cattle and 800 local employees.

== Controversies ==
In December 2001 the United Nations asked a panel of experts to investigate the illegal exploitation of natural resources and other forms of wealth of the Democratic Republic of the Congo. The panel's report was issued in October 2002. In it they said George Forrest had long-standing ties to the establishment in the Democratic Republic of the Congo and described him as a member of the elite network of Congolese interests.

== See also ==
- Banque du Congo Belge
