= AFR NuVenture Resources =

Canadian mining company

- Type: Copper mining
- Traded as: TSX-V: AFR
- Industry: Mining
- Founded: 1980
- Headquarters: Surrey, British Columbia, Canada
- Key people: Donald Nicholson, President
- Products: Copper and cobalt
- Website: www.afrnuventure.com

AFR NuVenture Resources (formerly African Metals Corporation) is a junior Canadian mining company.

Until 2018, the company undertook exploration and development of copper and cobalt mines in the Katanga Province of the Democratic Republic of the Congo (DRC). AMC's main asset was the Luisha South project.

== History ==
=== Alpine Exploration Corporation ===
The company was listed on 12 May 1980 as Alpine Exploration Corporation. In 1991 the company was prospecting for gold in west-central British Columbia. With rising gold prices, in 1995 Alpine Exploration said it was planning to spend $250,000 on exploration of its three properties in northern British Columbia and in Alaska.

=== Shiega Resources Corporation ===
Alpine Exploration changed its name to Shiega Resources Corporation in November 1997. In 1998 Shiega was in a joint venture with SAMAX Gold Inc. on the Nkroful gold mining project in Ghana. Shiega also had an interest in a project in the Tintina Gold Belt, northeast of Fairbanks, Alaska. That year Shiega was engaged in negotiations for a merger with Aurex AB, a gold miner, but the deal was dropped in January 1999.

=== African Metal Corporation ===
Shiega Resources changed the name of the company to African Metals Corporation in January 2000. Their main property is now the Luisha South concession in Katanga, DRC. The company also has an option to acquire an 80% interest in eight other properties with an area of about 682 square kilometres (263 sq mi).

In 2018, African Metals agreed to sell all of its assets in the DRC, including mining rights and dense media separation plant to Excellen Minerals SARL and Simeon Tshisangama.

=== AFR NuVenture Resources Inc. ===
In 2021, the company changed their name to AFR NuVenture Resources Inc..

== Luisha South ==
A permit to exploit the Luisha South project was issued in March 2006, and Chevalier Resources acquired 57% of the project. In November 2009 AMC announced a binding letter of intent to buy Chevalier. In June 2011 African Metals gave an initial estimate for its Luisha South Stockpile. There was an inferred 370,000 tonnes of ore at 1.0% copper and 0.5% cobalt. In September 2011 AMC announced it was acquiring another 33% interest in Luisha Mining Enterprise.

In August 2011 the company issued an updated estimate for the project as a whole. There was an inferred 14.7 million tonnes of ore at 1.1% copper and 0.3% cobalt, giving 161,700 tonnes of contained copper metal and 44,100 tonnes of contained cobalt metal. In September 2011 African Metals said a subsidiary had purchased a Dense Media Separation plant and other equipment in preparation for mining.
