= Luishia Mine =

Luishia mine Mine de Luishia
- Location within Democratic Republic of the Congo
- Location: Haut-Katanga, Democratic Republic of the Congo; 11°10′07″S 27°00′31″E
- Products: Copper, Cobalt

Luishia mine (French: Mine de Luishia) was an open pit copper and cobalt mine in Katanga Province, Democratic Republic of the Congo. A concession to the south of the mine has recently been opened to exploitation.

== Original open pit mine ==
The reduced facies-type deposit of copper and cobalt was mined from 1913 to 1949 by the Union Miniere du Haut Katanga. In October 1928 the mine employed 1,466 men. That month there were two deaths, and 16.37% of the men fell ill. The mine was hit by arson and sabotage in 1938 by miners dissatisfied with their pay and working conditions. In December 1941 the miners, and those in other mines in the area, began a general strike. While the open pit mine was in operation a total of 4.1 million tonnes of ore were extracted with an average grade of 8.3% copper.

== Later exploitation plans ==
In 2006, Compagnie Minière de Luisha (COMILU) was founded to run the mine, set up as a joint venture between China Overseas Engineering Group (COVEC) (72%) and the Congolese state-owned Gecamines (28%). The ownership structure was later reorganized to China Overseas Engineering Group (COVEC) (35.28%), China Railway Group Limited (CREC) (36.72%), and Gecamines (28%).

A 2007 assessment of the main Luishia mining permit noted that it included about 1,729 square kilometres (668 sq mi) over most of the mine and resource development area, including the existing and planned mining pit. There was a defined total resource of 26.1 million tonnes of ore with average grades of 2.95% copper and 0.68% cobalt. The review considered it would be practical to produce 3,000 tonnes of ore per day ore using large-scale open cut mining. As of 2008 the main Luishi orebody was controlled by a consortium owned by Chinese and local investors.

== Luishia South ==
The Luisha South project is 75 kilometres (47 mi) northwest of Lubumbashi and covers an area of 16.2 square kilometres (6.3 sq mi). It lies to the south of the main Luishi orebody. The Kipoi copper / cobalt exploration project of Tiger Resources lies to the southeast. Luisha South includes a small historical open pit mine and waste rock pile, as well as the underlying Roan group sediments assumed to hold major deposits of copper and cobalt. The Luisha South ore was explored between 1923 and 1928 through shafts and tunnels, finding that there was about 350,000 tonnes of ore at 8.6% copper. Most of this was later mined in a small open pit. Since closure, artisanal miners have continued to work the site sporadically.

The pit is in the northwest corner of the property at coordinates 11.178886°S 27.016658°E.

A permit to exploit the project was issued in March 2006. Chevalier Resources acquired 57% of the project. In November 209 African Metals Corporation announced a binding letter of intent to buy Chevalier. In June 2011 African Metals gave an initial estimate for its Luisha South Stockpile. There was an inferred 370,000 tonnes of ore at 1.0% copper and 0.5% cobalt. In August 2011 the company issued an updated estimate for the project as a whole. There was an inferred 14.7 million tonnes of ore at 1.1% copper and 0.3% cobalt, giving 161,700 tonnes of contained copper metal and 44,100 tonnes of contained cobalt metal. In September 2011 African Metals said a subsidiary had purchased a Dense Media Separation plant and other equipment in preparation for mining. In November 2011, the mine was evacuated due to violence surrounding the Congolese election, with workers resuming construction at the mine after the re-election of Joseph Kabila. In 2018, African Metals sold off its interest in the Luisha south to Excellen Minerals SARL and Simeon Tshisangama, the president of TSM Entreprise sprl.

== Sources ==
- Higginson, John (1989). A working class in the making: Belgian colonial labor policy, private enterprise, and the African mineworker, 1907-1951. Univ of Wisconsin Press. ISBN 0-299-12070-8.
