= Mutshatsha, Lualaba =

Mutshatsha
- Commune
- Location within Democratic Republic of the Congo
- Coordinates: 10°39′S 24°27′E
- Country: DR Congo
- Province: Lualaba
- Territory: Mutshatsha
- Elevation: 1,287 m (4,222 ft)
- Time zone: UTC+2 (Central Africa Time)

Mutshatsha is a town in the Democratic Republic of the Congo near the border with both Zambia and Angola. It is the administrative center of the territory of the same name in Lualaba province.

== Transport ==
The town is served by a station on the Benguela railway.

== See also ==
- Railway stations in DRCongo
- Transport in the Democratic Republic of the Congo
