= Lumwana mine =

Copper mine in North-Western, Zambia

Coordinates: 12.2242°S 25.8186°E

- Location within Zambia
- Location: North-Western Province, Zambia
- Products: Copper
- Company: Barrick Gold

The Lumwana mine is a large copper mine located in north-west Zambia in North-Western Province. Lumwana is owned by Barrick Gold and represents one of the largest copper reserves in Zambia and in the world having estimated 5.014 billion pounds of proven and probable copper reserves of ore grading 0.68% copper.

The mine is operated by Lumwana Mining Company Limited (LMC).

== Timeline ==
In 2019, Barrick Gold considered selling the mining operation after receiving interest from potential buyers following its merger with Randgold Resources Ltd., however the discussions fell through. It had previously in the same year attracted interest from companies including China Minmetals Corp., Jiangxi Copper Co. and Zijin Mining Group Co.

In an interview in November 2021, Barrick Gold CEO, Mark Bristow, indicated Lumwana copper mine was on course to contribute roughly 20% of the group’s annual EBITDA largely due to the increase in the copper price. The improvement in the copper price also meant that Barrick will have more flexibility on whether it proceeds to the development of a super-pit at Lumwana. He also added that the normalisation of Zambia’s fiscal regulations with the reintroduction of mineral royalties being deductible from corporate tax was a significant event.
