= Ruashi mine =

Mine in the Democratic Republic of the Congo

Ruashi Mine
- Location within Democratic Republic of the Congo
- Location: Haut-Katanga, Democratic Republic of the Congo; 11°37′00″S 27°33′00″E
- Products: Copper; Cobalt
- Company: Metorex (75%); Gécamines (25%)
- Website: www.metorexgroup.com/mine/ruashi-mining/

The Ruashi Mine is an open-pit copper and cobalt mine operated by Metorex that is located about 10 kilometres (6.2 mi) from Lubumbashi in Katanga Province, Democratic Republic of the Congo. The project includes a plant to concentrate the ore from the Ruashi and Etoile mines, and a modern solvent extraction electrowinning (SX-EW) processing plant. As of 2008, annual capacity was estimated to be 10,000 tonnes of copper and 1,000 tonnes of Cobalt.

== Location ==
The Ruashi mine is located at an elevation of about 1,285 metres (4,216 ft) above sea level. The climate is sub-tropical, with annual rainfall of about 1,200 millimetres (47 in) falling mostly in the October to March period. Average temperatures are between 17 °C (63 °F) and 24 °C (75 °F), with no marked difference between summer and winter. The region lies in a zone that would naturally be covered by Miombo Woodland, deciduous tropical woodlands. Lying on the edge of Lubumbashi, much of the woodland has been cleared.

Tanganyika Concessions dug pits and trenches in the area in 1907. Union Minière du Haut Katanga (UMHK) discovered the Etoile ore body in 1911, and the Ruashi ore body in 1919. For the next half century both properties were quarried intermittently for their high-grade copper ore. UMHK was nationalized in 1967. Control of all copper and cobalt exploration and production was given to Gécamines, established as the state mining company.

== Ownership ==
The Ruashi mining project is operated by Ruashi Mining, which was originally 80% owned by Metorex of South Africa and 20% by the DRC state-owned Gécamines. Ruashi Mining is now 75% owned by Metorex.

== Development ==
1,269 drillholes have been sunk on the Ruashi property over the years, and further drilling was conducted in 2003 and in 2005 to confirm asset size estimates. The project was developed in two phases. In the $31 million first phase, a concentrator was built at Ruashi using idle plant from O'okiep. This was to initially process existing oxide stockpiles. The Sable processing plant in Zambia was then used to extract copper metal and cobalt salt from the concentrate. Annual production capacity was estimated as 10,000 tonnes of copper cathode and 1,000 tonnes of cobalt carbonate. Phase two involved expanding the concentrator and building a new acid-leaching and SX-EW plant to produce copper and cobalt metal on site. In this phase, which used higher-grade copper ore from the Ruashi mine, capacity increased to 45,000 tonnes of copper cathode and about 3,500 tonnes of cobalt carbonate or metal. Capital costs of phase two were estimated at $335 million. Meterox, with debt of $2 billion in 2009, was forced to sell other assets in order to fund the phase two expansion.

== Production ==
Initial production began in June 2006, processing material from 56 dumps and tailings dams at Ruashi and Etoile. There were delays in ramp-up, mainly caused by a shortage of water. The mine had been taking water from open cast pits. Ruashi had to install pipelines to access water from deeper in the pits, and had to drill boreholes to gain a predictable supply. In the year ended 30 June 2008, Ruashi produced 10,767 tonnes of copper. Production of copper and cobalt from tailings near the Ruashi Mine continued until December 2008. The second phase, mining the Ruashi ore body, started in the second half of 2008, with refining at the new SX/EW plant. 21,371 tonnes of refined copper were produced in 2009. Planned production levels from 2010 to 2013 were 36,000 tonnes per year of refined copper and 4,500 tonnes per year of contained cobalt. As of 2010 the mine had access to about 13.3 million tons of ore, graded at 2.9% copper and 0.43% cobalt. On this basis, the project had a life of about ten years.
