= Forrest Group =

Belgian group of companies

- Type: Private
- Founded: 1922
- Founder: Malta Forrest
- Key people: George Arthur Forrest, Chairman; Malta David Forrest, CEO
- Website: forrestgroup.com

The Forrest Group (also Groupe Forrest) is a Belgian and Congolese conglomerate that was founded in 1922. Historically one of the DR Congo's largest mining companies, the Group's interests are concentrated in infrastructure, agribusiness, and energy. It is owned by the Belgian-New Zealand Forrest family.

== Early history ==
Malta Forrest launched l'Entreprise Générale Malta Forrest (EGMF), a transport company, in 1922, in Katanga Province in the south of the Belgian Congo. In 1933, the company moved into mining gold, copper and manganese in the Kolwezi, Musonoi and Kasekelesa mines. In 1951, the company undertook the mining and civil engineering works to open the Kisenge manganese mine. In the early 1950s, it broadened out into public works and civil engineering, building the roads, sewerage system and airport for the mining city of Kolwezi. Around this time, the firm began to focus on civil engineering in the western Katanga copper belt.

Victor Eskenazi-Forrest, Malta Forrest’s adoptive son, helped his father to manage the company starting in 1954, and took over the company with George Arthur Forrest after the death of the founder. In 1968, the company took limited liability status. It was then involved in a series of large scale public works projects funded by international organizations such as the World Bank and the African Development Bank. Malta Forrest died in 1974, and Victor Eskenazi-Forrest and George Arthur Forrest, the founder's son, became Managing Directors. In 1986, after the death of Victor Eskenazi Forrest, George Arthur Forrest took full control.

The company undertook a major government contract to restore the road network in Lubumbashi, Likasi, Kolwezi and Kalemie. In 1990 EGMF undertook a large strip mining work for the state-controlled mining company Gécamines. In 1991 the country, now called Zaire, went through political upheaval and fell into a prolonged recession, bring the engineering works to a halt. In May 1995 EGMF helped fund Gécamines in mining the cobalt deposit of Kasombo 1, working as a private sector partner to the state-owned company. George Forrest created the George Forrest International Group that year.

== Later activities ==
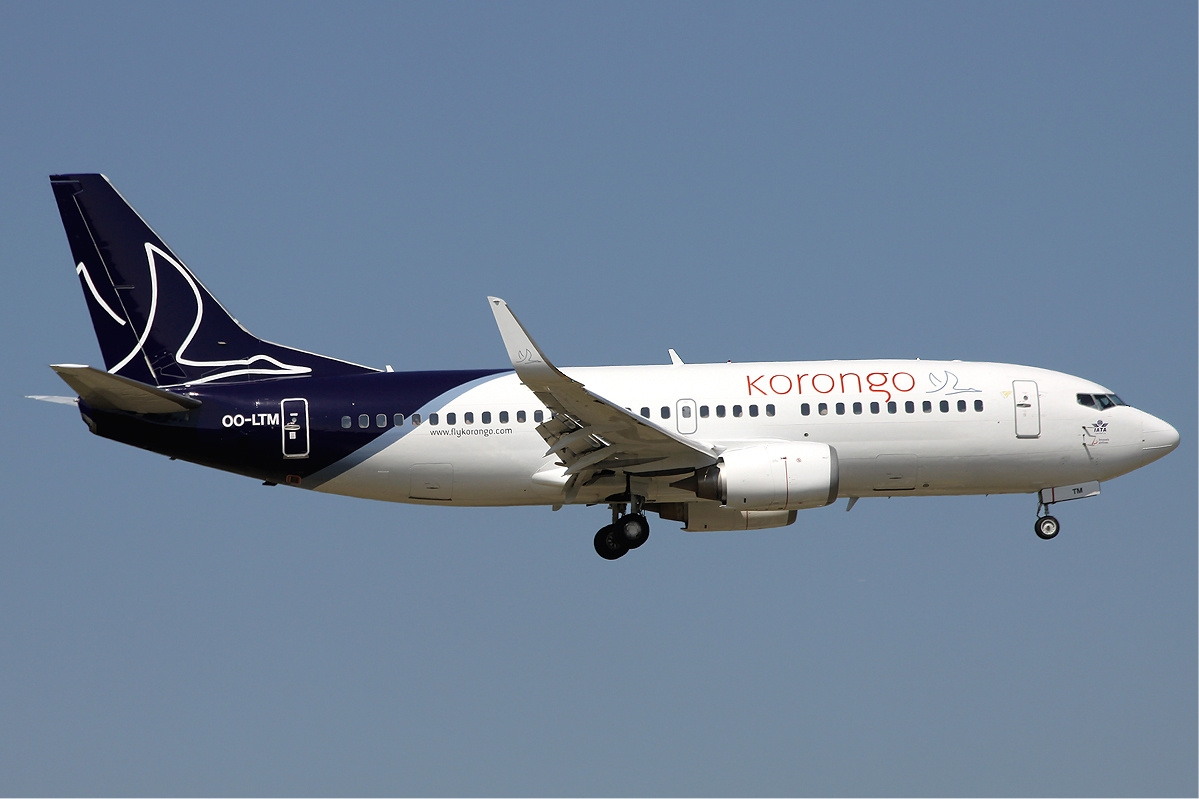
Korongo Airlines Boeing 737-300

Forrest Group International S.A., the conglomerate's holding company, is headquartered in Brussels. The conglomerate's chief Congolese subsidiary is Entreprise Générale Malta Forrest, based in Lubumbashi. The conglomerate's other companies are Congo Energy, Ateliers d’Electro Maintenance Industriels, NSM Hydro, GRELKA, Centre Médical de la Communauté, and the charitable Rachel Forrest Foundation. The companies pursue diverse industrial activities, including wind power energy, hydroelectric energy, cement manufacturing, cattle breeding, public works, civil engineering, biological food, aviation, and munitions manufacturing.

George's son, Malta David Forrest, took over leadership of the Group in 2011, with George remaining as chairman of the Forrest Group. Malta David Forrest has overseen further investment in electricity, particularly in renewable energy. His siblings, Michael Igor and Rowena, also work in the Group. The company divested from its mining interests in 2018 in order to pivot to infrastructure, agribusiness, and energy.

== Controversy ==
In 2002, a United Nations panel named the George Forrest Group as one of 29 companies that should face sanctions for their operations in the Democratic Republic of the Congo.

In December 2010, WikiLeaks published cables that alleged showed that US officials were ignoring reports of dangerously high levels of radiation at Forrest's Luiswishi Mine, and implied that uranium was being separated from the ore which purportedly held only copper and cobalt. Groupe Forrest International refuted these rumors, saying that although uranium was present in the copper and cobalt ore from the mine, it was at far too low a grade to be exploited, and radioactivity in the Luiswishi mine was largely lower than the European standards.

In 2009, Forrest invested in Korongo Airlines, together with Brussels Airlines and local investors, for flights between Lubumbashi and Kinshasa. The launch of other domestic services under the Forrest Group brand depended on upgrades to airport infrastructure.
