= Kipushi Mine =

Mine in Democratic Republic of the Congo

- Mine de Kipushi
- Location within Democratic Republic of the Congo
- Location: Haut-Katanga Province, Democratic Republic of the Congo; 11°46′02″S 27°14′13″E
- Products: Zinc; Copper; Silver; Germanium
- Active: 1924-1993
- Company: Ivanhoe Mines (68%); Gécamines (32%)
- Website: ivanhoemines.com/projects/kipushi-project/

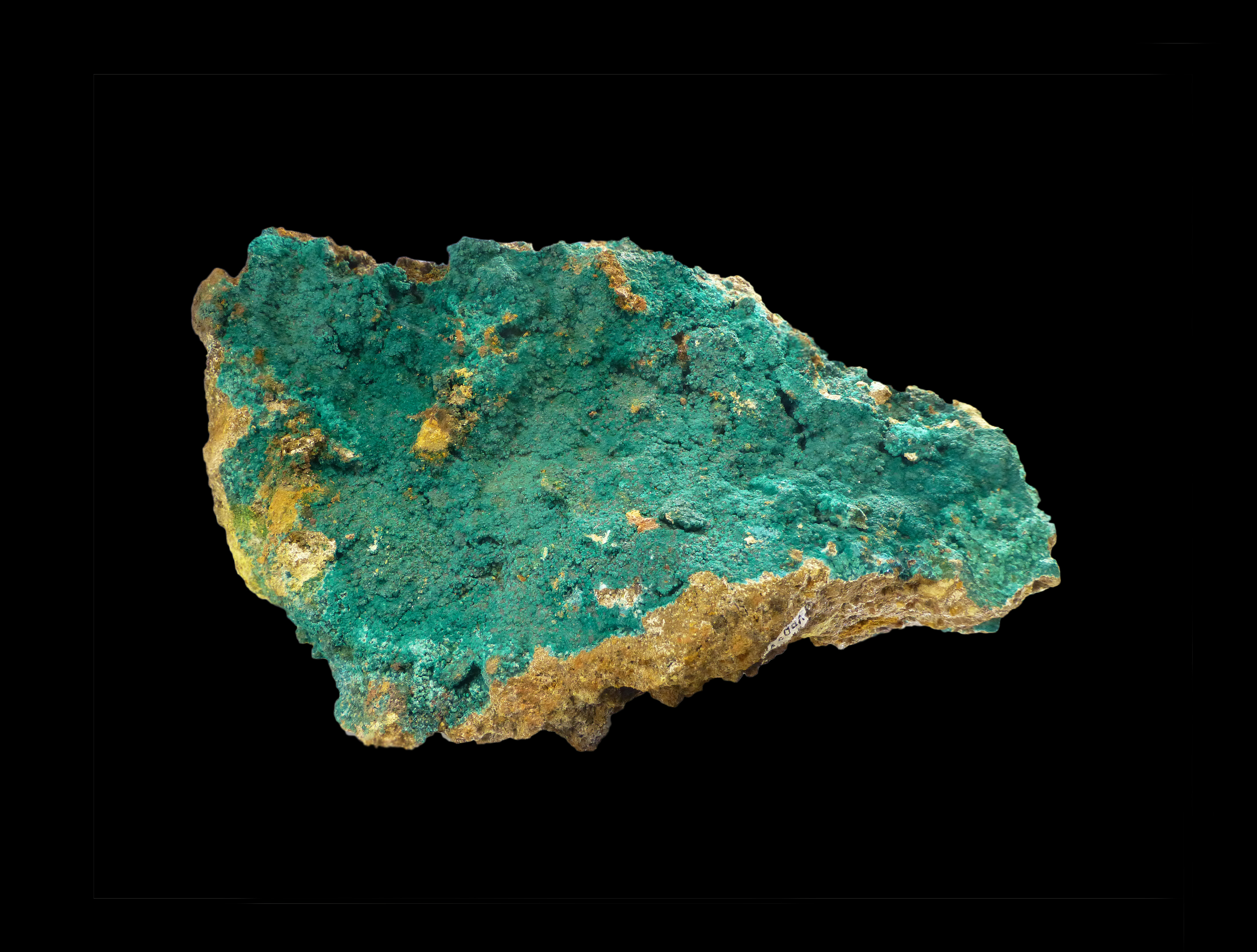
mineral sample

Kipushi Mine (formerly Prince Léopold Mine, French: Mine Prince Léopold) is an underground mine in the Democratic Republic of the Congo, near the town of Kipushi in Haut-Katanga Province.

Copper mining has occurred at Kipushi since prehistory. Based on radiocarbon dating, one study concluded there was mining activity at Kipushi in the 9th century. Production increased significantly in the 14th century, but it is unclear who was exploiting the mine at this time. Due to the unique geology of Kipushi, copper produced at the mine is chemically distinct from copper sourced from the surrounding areas of the copperbelt.

It was an active producing mine between 1925 and 1993, as of 2006 there was an estimated 16.9 million tons of ore in the measured and indicated categories, with a grade averaging of 16.7% zinc and 2.2% copper.

Since 2011, the Kipushi Mine is now majority owned by Ivanplats. A feasibility study was conducted in 2022, which found 11.78 million tonnes of Zinc at an ore grade of 35.34%. In September 2022, construction started to re-open the mine, with production planned to start in late 2024.
