= Sase prospect =

- Location within Democratic Republic of the Congo
- Location: Haut-Katanga, Democratic Republic of the Congo; 11°29′17″S 27°10′09″E
- Products: Copper, Cobalt

The Sase prospect is a copper-bearing deposit in Katanga Province, Democratic Republic of the Congo, being developed by Tiger Resources.

The Sase prospect lies within the Lupoto concession, about 10 kilometres (6.2 mi) the south of Tiger's Kipoi Mine and to the north of the older Lupoto Mine in the Kalumines concession area. The concession covers an area of 140 square kilometres (54 sq mi). In 2008 Tiger reported that exploratory drilling had found ores with significant grades of copper. Mineralization at the Sase location has been shown on a strike length of 700 metres (2,300 ft) and width up to 300 metres (980 ft). Maiden resource was planned for release in the first half of 2011. In February 2011, Tiger said it was planning to build a solvent-extraction plant that would process copper ore feed from the Kipoi and Lupoto projects.
