= Musonoi Mine =

Mine near Kolwezi, DRC

Musonoi mine
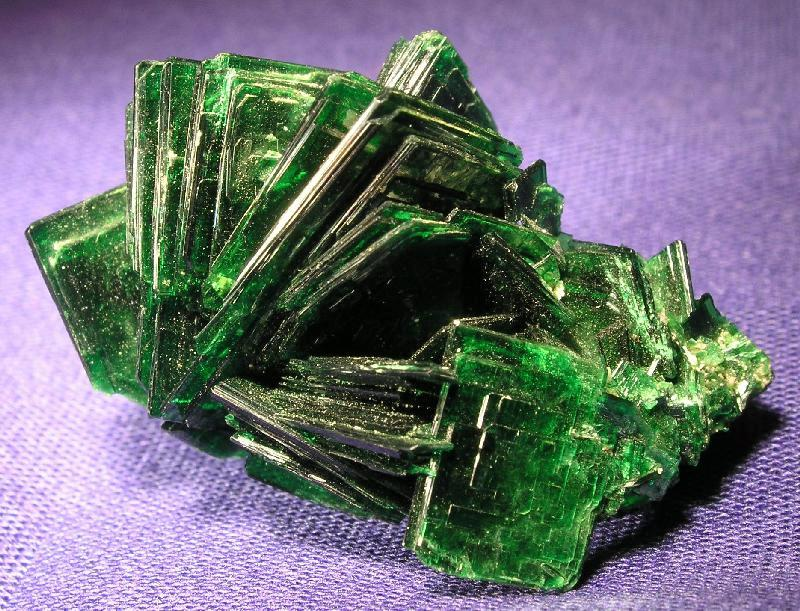
- Metatorbernite from the Musonoi Mine

- Location within Democratic Republic of the Congo
- Location: Lualaba Province, Democratic Republic of the Congo; 10°42′39″S 25°23′56″E
- Products: Copper, Cobalt
- Company: Metorex (75%); Gécamines (25%)

The Musonoi mine is a set of open-cut pits near Kolwezi from which copper and other metals have been extracted since the 1940s. The mining complex is located in the Lualaba Province of the Democratic Republic of the Congo. Kolwezi is about 320 kilometres (200 mi) northwest from Lubumbashi, the provincial capital.

== Ore body ==
The Kolwezi ore district lies near the northwest limit of the Katanga Copperbelt. It holds over half of the copper and cobalt in the copperbelt. The Musonoi mine is located in a dolomitic inferior formation of the Roan Group, Katanga Supergroup, from the Precambrian IV age. It is deeply affected by folds and thrust nappes.

Two ore bodies about 10 metres (33 ft) thick are known, containing copper, cobalt, manganese and uranium. The mine has a rare assemblage of uranyl selenite minerals, and has palladium minerals.

== Pre-history ==
The Dikuluwe mine near Musonoi has been exploited since prehistoric times. Monseigneur de Hemptinne watched Yeke people working this mine as late as 1924. They would work in the dry season, stopping when the first rains arrived. The mining camp was near a stream where millet could be planted. Women and children collected malachite from the surface, while men used iron picks to excavate pits and shafts, using fire to crack the rocks when needed. The mines were between 10 metres (33 ft) and 15 metres (49 ft) deep with galleries up to 20 metres (66 ft) long. The ore would be sorted and then taken to a nearby stream for concentration before being smelted.

== Commercial operations ==
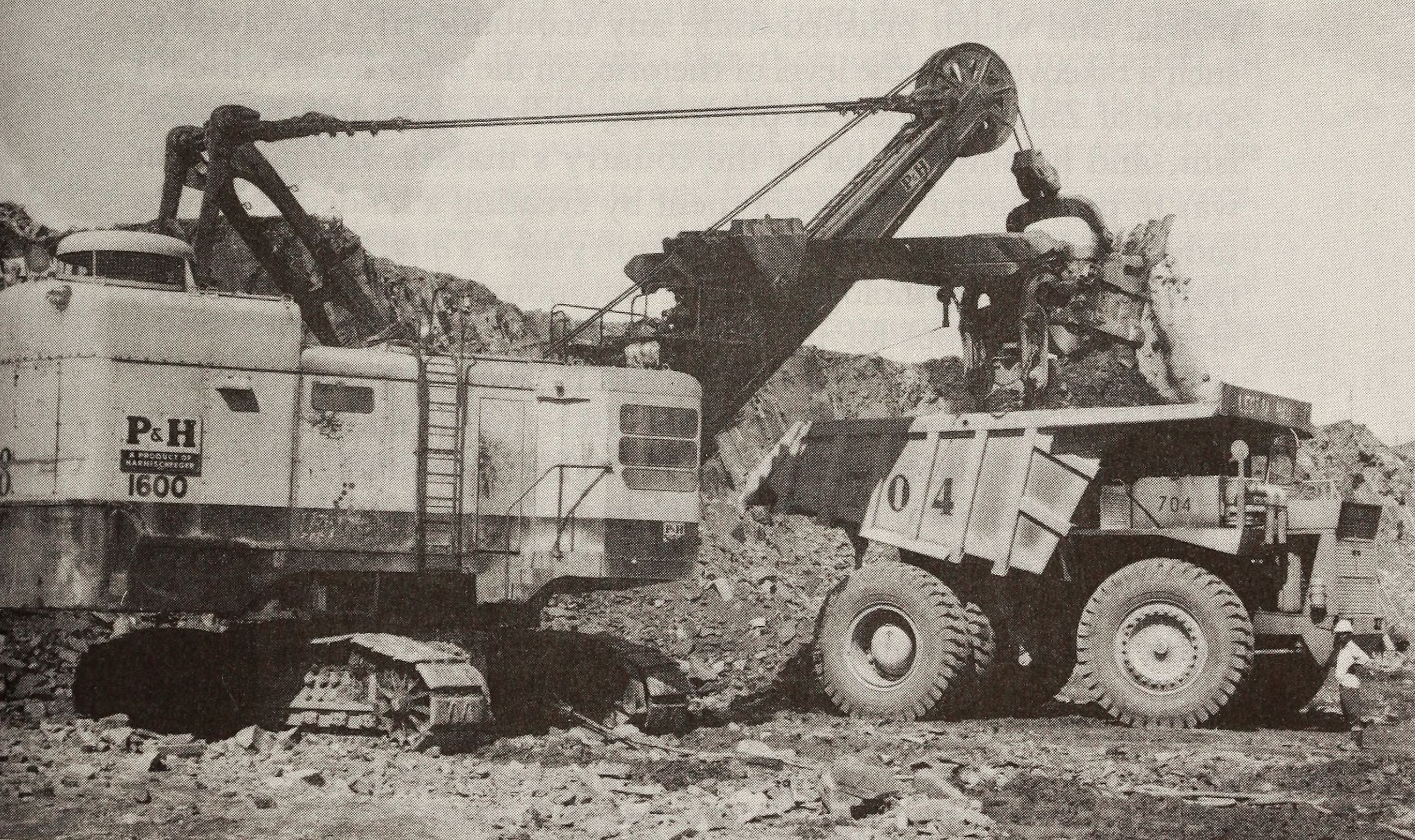
A steam shovel loading copper and cobalt ore to be processed at Musonoi Mine in the 1980s or the 1990s.

Commercial mining at Musonoi began in the 1920s, with laborers being forcibly recruited. The Union Minière constantly struggled to prevent recruits fleeing from the site, sometimes taking refuge in Angola. Workers were mistreated and suffered badly from disease brought on by the working conditions. The lowest death rate at the Panda, Lubumbashi, Kisanga and Musonoi work sites in 1928 was four men per month.

By the 1930s, the operation at Musonoi was highly mechanized, while world demand for copper was dropping. Workers used sabotage and arson as well as flight as bargaining tools for better conditions. Musonoi Principal, the oldest open cut, was opened in the 1940s. By 1953 the open pit mine was the largest copper and cobalt producer in the country. Another cut was begun in the 1950s and a third in the 1970s. The three were eventually combined and connected with the Kamoto mines.

== Tailings ==
The Kolwezi tailings project was initiated in 2004 to recover tailings from two deposits, the Kingamyambo tailings dam and the Musunoi river tailings. Due to poor recovery rates when the mines were operational, these tailings hold valuable quantities of copper. In September 2010 the Kolwezi tailings project was the subject of a complaint to the UK regulator by Canadian company First Quantum Minerals. First Quantum's project had been seized by the DRC government. The company alleged that Eurasian Natural Resources Corporation, which had acquired a large share in the project, had misled investors over the acquisition. The Musonoi River tailings are now within Area 3 at Musonoi. Eurasian Resources Group ERG, a Chinese owned subsidiary, have a mining license and the resource is given as 112 million tonnes of Copper tailings at 1.49% copper and 0.32% cobalt.

== Metrorex ==
The deposit was initially discovered in 2007. in 2008, Metorex was carrying out drilling at Musonoi in preparation of opening a new underground mine at the site. The mine contains 32.1 million tonnes at a grade of 2.8% copper and 0.9% cobalt, with a feasibility study completed in 2017, and construction scheduled to begin in 2019.

== Sources ==
- Bisson, Michael S.; Vogel, Joseph O. (2000). Ancient African metallurgy: the sociocultural context. Rowman & Littlefield. ISBN 0-7425-0261-9.
- Higginson, John (1989). A working class in the making: Belgian colonial labor policy, private enterprise, and the African mineworker, 1907-1951. Univ of Wisconsin Press. ISBN 0-299-12070-8.
- Laznicka, Peter (2010). Giant Metallic Deposits: Future Sources of Industrial Metals. Springer. ISBN 978-3-642-12404-4.
