= Kambove mines =

Group of copper mines near Kambove, Democratic Republic of the Congo

- Location within Democratic Republic of the Congo
- Location: Katanga Province, Democratic Republic of the Congo; 10°48′46″S 26°35′09″E
- Products: Copper, cobalt
- Company: Gécamines
- Website: www.gecamines.cd

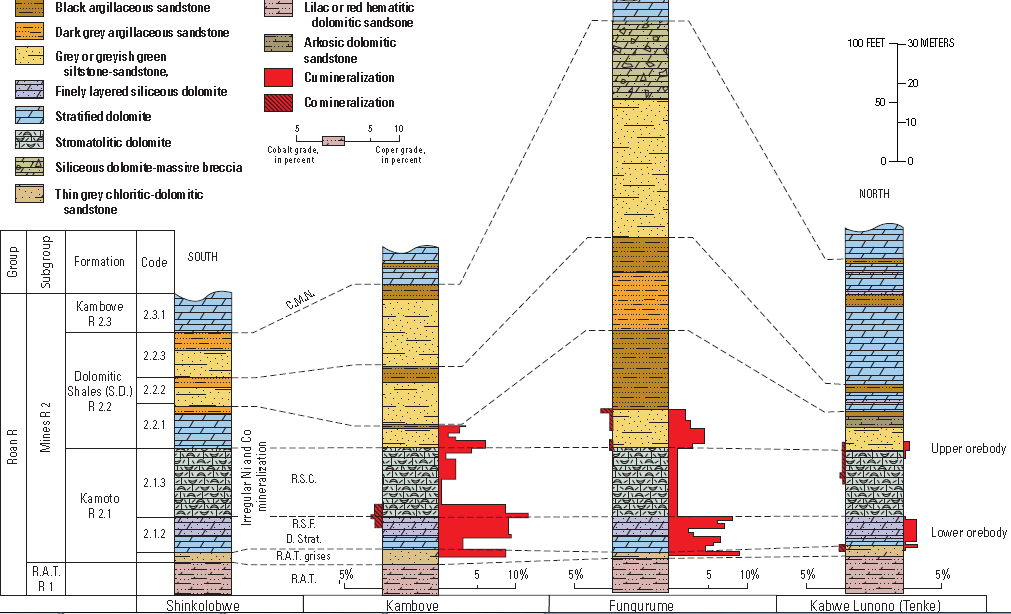
Kambove Geologic Column

The Kambove mines (French: Société minière de Kababancola) are a group of active or abandoned copper mines near Kambove in the Democratic Republic of the Congo. They were originally established by the Union Minière du Haut-Katanga under Belgian rule.

Inactive mines in the region include Kabolela Mine, Kakanda deposit, Kambove Principal Mine and M'sesa Mine. Gécamines, a state-owned mining company, owns the Kamoya central, Kamoya south, Shangolowe and Kamfundwa mines. Other mines are Kambove West Mine and the "secret" Kamoya South II Mine.

In January 2001 the Kababancola Mining Company (KMC) was established as a copper and cobalt mining partnership for a 25-year term. Tremalt, controlled by John Bredenkamp, held 80% of KMC while Gecamines held 20%. KMC gained the rights to mines, facilities and concentrators at Kambove and Kakanda. KMC made relatively low investment in these properties, continuing to operate the already-functioning Kamoya Mine but not opening the others. In March 2002 the DRC authorities took back control of the Kambove concentrator from Tremalt following a complaint by the manager of KMC against Gecamines at the International Centre for the Settlement of Investment Disputes.

== See also ==
- Katanga Supergroup
- Central African Copperbelt
