= Lake Kashiba =

Lake in Zambia

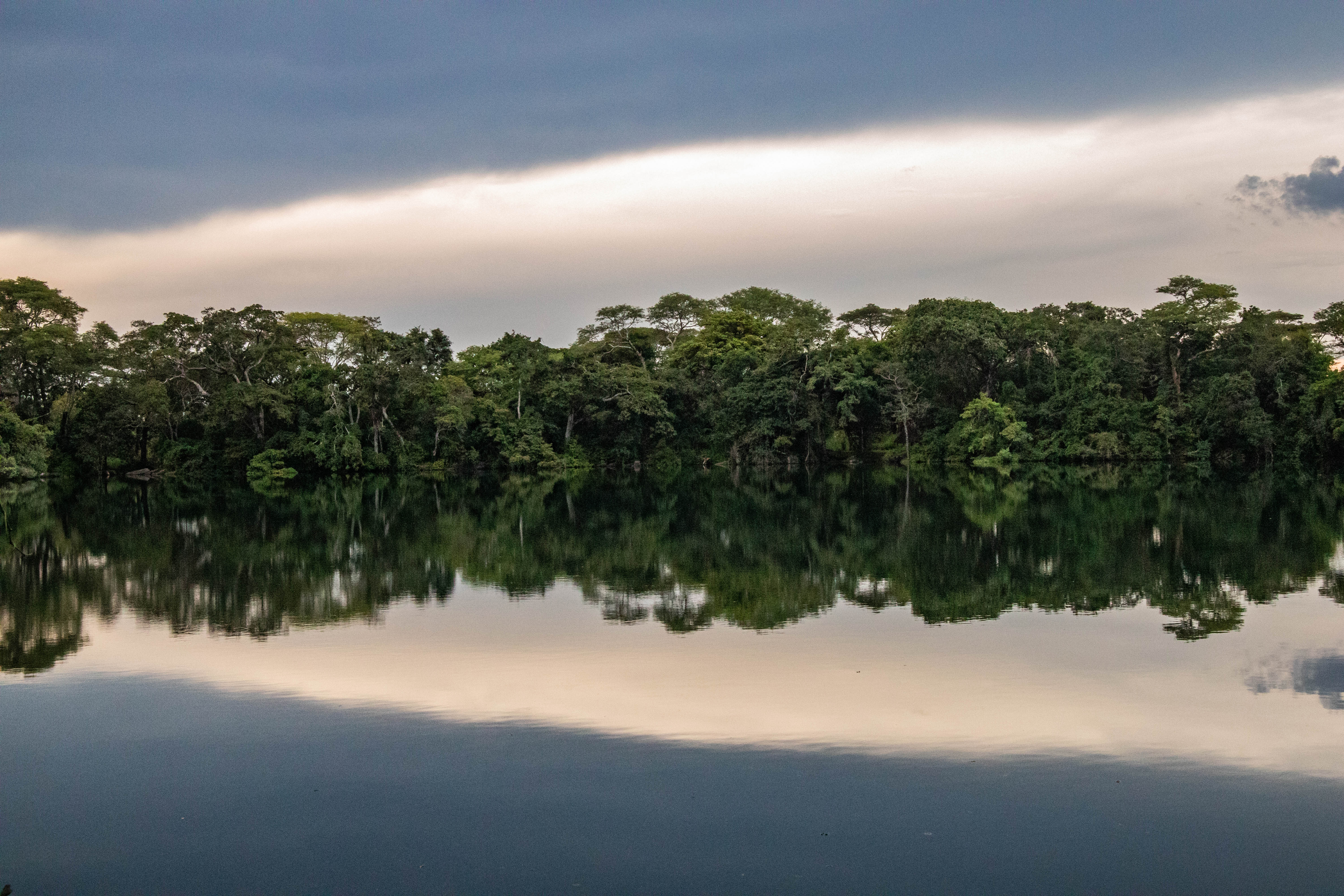

- Location within Zambia Location within Africa
- Coordinates: 13°26′38″S 27°56′24″E
- Basin countries: Zambia
- Surface area: 3.5 ha (8.6 acres)
- Max. depth: 100 m (330 ft)

Lake Kashiba is situated southwest of Luanshya in Zambia, close to Mpongwe and St Anthony's Mission.

== Hydrography ==
Lake Kashiba is best known for the several small, deep pools in the Ndola district called "The Sunken Lakes." They are found in limestone and were caused by the action of water on the rock, dissolving it and forming caves which eventually collapsed, leaving deep holes filled with water. Kashiba is the most impressive and means "small lake." It measures about 3.5 hectares (8.6 acres) in area and the depth is about 70 metres at the south side and approximately 150 metres at the north side. The water level is about 10 metres (33 ft) below the surrounding forest, and through the clear blue water, fish are easy to see, mostly bream, with some carp

== Local legends ==
Local legends prohibit from catching fish from Kashiba as they are unable to be cooked no matter the time. Kashiba is also said to contain a monster called “Ichitapa” or “lsoka lkulu.” When a man stands on the rocks at the lake’s edge, with his shadow over the water, the monster emerges from the depths and catches the shadow, doing so, the victim becomes paralyzed and falls into the water.

But the best known of the legends of Kashiba goes back to the earliest history of the Lamba people, to Kabunda, son of Chipimpi, the chief who came from the west with seeds to plant the first gardens for the people. One day, when Chipimpi's people had finished plastering a grain store, he gave them all porridge to eat, but to Kabunda and his nephew, he gave a goat so that they might wash off the mud with the goat's blood. But Kabunda demanded the blood of a man, and Kapimpi gave him a slave to kill. Kabunda killed the slave with his hoe, saying: "Now we are the people of the Hair Clan, for we have killed a man with hair on his head. But you, my father and cousin, are people of the Goat Clan:' And Kabunda slew Chipimpi and became chief.

In time, Kabunda began to ill-treat the younger relatives of Chipimpi, members of the Goat Clan, and they became angry, saying they were of the chief's clan and should not be treated thus. "Let us now kill ourselves! Let us see what will remain! Kabunda can remain, and the kingdom can be his!" So they all went to Kashiba, where they took all their goods and chattels, goats and chickens and dogs, and tied themselves together with a long rope and threw themselves into the lake. But a member of the Leopard Clan was at the end of the rope, and at the last moment, he cut it in front of his wife and carried her back to the village, where she became the mother of all the Goat Clan.

== General references ==
- Tales of Zambia by Dick Hobson. 1996. Zambia Society Trust, London.
- A visit to Lake Kashiba and the local legend story
