= Metorex =

South African mining company

- Type: Subsidiary
- Traded as: JSE: MTX (1999-2011)
- Industry: Mining
- Founded: 1975
- Headquarters: Johannesburg, South Africa
- Key people: Yonghong Cheng, CEO
- Owner: Jinchuan Group
- Website: www.metorexgroup.com

Metorex is a mining company based in Johannesburg, South Africa. It has assets in the Democratic Republic of the Congo (DRC), Zambia and elsewhere. A takeover bid by the Jinchuan Group of China valued the company at US$1.1 billion. Since January 2012, the company is a wholly owned subsidiary of Jinchuan Group.

== History ==
The company was founded in 1975 by a consortium that included Anthony Simon Malone, and acquired Rand London Mines. In the following years Metorex acquired additional properties mining a variety of minerals including gold, coal, asbestos, copper, zinc and tin. The mines were located in South Africa, Namibia and Zambia. In December 1999 Metorex merged with Consolidated Murchison and listed on the JSE and LSE exchanges. In the following years the company continued to expand through acquisition of new properties. In 2004 Metorex entered into a joint venture to develop the Ruashi copper mine site in the DRC, and subsequently made substantial investments in this project.

In April 2011 Vale announced that it intended to offer to purchase Metorex at a price of R7,524 million. This was topped by an offer by Jinchuan Group in July 2011 that valued the company at R9,112 million. Jinchuan said it would treat Metorex as a strategic vehicle for expanding its mining presence in Africa. In October 2011 the South African and Zambian competition authorities approved the bid, now worth US$1.1 billion, and the main Zambian and DRC investors approved the deal.

== Assets ==
Assets in the DRC include the existing Kinsenda Mine, the new Ruashi copper and cobalt mine, and the Dilala East and Lubembe deposit greenfields sites. In Zambia the company owns Chibuluma, a modern mechanised underground copper mine located near the town of Kalulushi that produces copper concentrate to be sold to smelters.

Copper Resources Corporation is a subsidiary of Metorex. As of November 2011 it held a 92.5% interest in the Hinoba-an Porphyry Copper project in the Philippines, and a 75% interest in Miniere de Musoshi et Kinsenda (MMK). MMK, formerly a subsidiary of Forrest Group, owned the flooded Kinsenda and Musoshi copper mines in the Katanga Province. MMK became a subsidiary of Copper Resources Corporation as of 30 November 2005. Due to a Title Revisitation Process initiated by the DRC government, in February 2009 it was confirmed that the Musoshi mine would be returned to the state-owned Sodimico. MMK also holds the Lubembe high-grade deposit.
