= Tiger Resources =

- Type: Gold mining
- Traded as: ASX: TGS
- Industry: Mining
- Headquarters: Balcatta, Australia
- Products: Copper
- Website: www.tigerez.com

Tiger Resources Limited is an Australia-based mining company with two active copper extraction projects in the Democratic Republic of the Congo (DRC). The company was listed on the Australian Securities Exchange in May 1997. As of 2011 the company's market capitalisation was about A$350 million.

The Kipoi Mine has an inferred 306,000 tonnes of copper in high-grade ore. It is a joint venture between Tiger Resources (60%) and the state-owned Gécamines (40%). It was planned to start generating revenue in 2011.

Tiger invested more than $60 million to start the mine. By June 2011 Tiger was producing 25% copper concentrate at a rate of 130,000 metric tons a year. The company was considering using $250 million from cash flow to build a Solvent Extraction Electrowinning copper cathode plant, with capacity of 50,000 tons per year. Tiger Resources was negotiating to acquire a higher share of the operation from Gécamines.

The Lupoto Mine is 100% owned by Tiger Resources. Maiden resource was planned for release in 2011.

The European trading house Trafigura was the largest shareholder of Tiger Resources as of September 2011, owning 28% of the company. Trafigura also owned 35% of Anvil Mining, another DRC copper miner, whose sale to China's Minmetals Resources was announced in September 2011.

In 2014, Tiger Resources bought out Gecamines' 40% stake in the Kipoi Mine for $111 million, leaving it as the sole shareholder.

In 2018, after considering a plan to sell off its copper assets to Sinomine HK, Tiger called off the $260 million dollar sale.

Tiger was delisted from the Australian Securities Exchange in February 2020, the company's directors resigned, and underwent administration.
