= Zhejiang Huayou Cobalt =

Chinese cobalt company

- Trade name: 603799 (China: Shanghai)
- Company type: Lt PTD
- Traded as: 603799 (China: Shanghai)
- Industry: Mining
- Founded: 2002; 24 years ago
- Headquarters: Tongxiang Economic Development Zone, Zhejiang, China
- Key people: Chen Xuehua (President & CEO)
- Products: Li-ion battery material
- Revenue: CNY 65.36 billion (USD 8.9 billion) (2023)
- Net income: ▲CNY 3.74 million (2023)
- Number of employees: 29760 (2023)
- Website: www.huayou.com

Huayou Cobalt Co., Ltd primarily operates as a supplier of cobalt and its associated products, such as cobalt tetroxide, cobalt oxide, cobalt carbonate, cobalt hydroxide, cobalt oxalate, cobalt sulfate, and cobalt monoxide. The company is headquartered in the Tongxiang Economic Development Zone of Zhejiang, China.

Throughout its history, Huayou Cobalt has focused on various aspects, including research, development, and manufacturing, with a particular emphasis on new energy Li-ion battery materials and advanced cobalt materials. The company has also organized its operations into four business units, which are Resources Development, New Materials Manufacturing, New Energy Manufacturing, and Recycling. These units collectively contribute to various aspects of the industrial ecosystem related to new energy lithium batteries, including cobalt and nickel mineral development, refining processes, Li-ion battery cathode material production, as well as reusing and recycling.

== History ==
Huayou Cobalt Co., Ltd was founded in the year 2002.

In 2006, Huayou established its first cobalt mine and smelter in Congo.

Quzhou Huayou Cobalt New Material Co Ltd founded on May 30, 2011, with a registered capital of 700 million yuan($101 million) (the registered capital was increased to 1.2 billion yuan in January 2016).

On June 27, 2012, the construction of Huayou's cobalt new material project with an annual capacity of 10,000 tons in Huayou Quzhou commenced.

The company was listed on the Shanghai Stock Exchange on January 29, 2015.

Huayou New Energy Technology (Quzhou) Co. Ltd. was established on May 16, 2016.

On January 10, 2018, Huayou entered into a contract with POSCO for the Li-ion battery new energy material project, focusing on precursor and cathode material production in Tongxiang.

On May 7, 2018, Huayou Cobalt signed a joint-venture agreement with LG Chem, resulting in the establishment of Huajin New Energy Material (Quzhou) Co. Ltd.

In 2018, Huayou Holdings became a shareholder of B&M Science and Technology Co., Ltd.

In 2019, Huayou initiated nickel mining and smelting operations in Indonesia.

In 2020, the construction of Huayou's HPAL project began in Indonesia.

In 2021, the company commenced construction on its Indonesian Huake high-grade nickel matte project.

In the same year, a joint venture project with South Korea's POSCO for a recycling company commenced construction, and the company signed an MOU with Volkswagen (China) to collaborate on the Indonesia-China lithium battery material integration project.

During 2021, Guangxi B&M and Zhejiang B&M were established, with B&M later integrated into Huayou Cobalt's system in August.

Volkswagen Group China signed two Memorandums of Understanding (MOUs) with Huayou Cobalt and Tsingshan Group to set up two Joint Ventures (JV) to cover the upstream and downstream of the cathode supply chain on March 21, 2022.

The joint venture between LG and Tianjin B&M Science and Technology (B&M) was announced on May 31, 2022, focusing on the manufacturing of NCM cathode material.

On March 30, 2023, PT Vale Indonesia Tbk and China's Zhejiang Huayou Cobalt Co. announced a collaboration with global automaker Ford Motor Co. for a HPAL project, which aims to enhance sustainable nickel production in Indonesia, with the resulting nickel products being integrated into Ford's battery raw material supply chain.

Continued expansion efforts in 2023 include the construction of the Guangxi Plant, extension of the Quzhou Plant, and the establishment of a European Plant.

== Business segments ==
After decades of development, Huayou Cobalt has established an integrated industrial chain around Li-ion battery material. The African resource industry group, Indonesian nickel industry group, new material industry group, new energy industry group and recycling industry group constitutes the five major industries of Huayou.

=== Resources ===
The company's resource operations primarily involve the extraction, refining, and initial processing of various non-ferrous metals, including cobalt, nickel, lithium, and copper. In the cobalt and copper sectors, the main products are crude cobalt hydroxide and electrolytic copper. The company has established a business model for its African resource activities, centered around a combination of self-owned mines and supplementary sourcing from local mines and mining companies in the Democratic Republic of Congo.

Regarding the nickel business, the primary offerings consist of crude nickel hydroxide and high-grade nickel intermediates. The company ensures its supply of nickel ore mainly through holding shares of mine and long-term cooperative agreements for supply, with additional sourcing based on market dynamics.

In the lithium sector, the company engages in mining and ore selection from its proprietary mines in Zimbabwe, which contribute to the production of main products – lithium spodumene concentrate and lithian mica concentrate.

=== New Materials ===
The New Material Industry sector plays a connecting role in Huayou's business industrial chain. Its main products include ternary precursor, cobalt tetroxide, nickel sulphate and cobalt hydroxide which are mainly used in aerospace superalloy, battery cathode materials for 3C products and power batteries and industrial catalysts.

=== New Energy ===
Huayou New Energy Industrial Group is the core business unit of cathode materials. Huayou New Energy currently has four major bases in Chengdu, Tianjin, Quzhou, and Guangxi, two domestic joint ventures: Leyou New Energy Materials (Wuxi) Co., Ltd., Zhejiang POSCO-HUAYOU ESM Co., Ltd. and an oversea joint venture LG BCM.Ltd.(Korea), furthermore, the plans to invest in the construction of a cathode material project for high-nickel power batteries in Hungary through its holding subsidiary Bamo Technology Hungary Kft Co., Ltd was officially announced on June 21, 2023.

=== Recycling ===
The recycling industry sector established a business model of Closed loop "swap waste to materials", and providing customers with safe and sustainable waste battery solutions. The Modular pre-processing capability allows the company to processing 65,000 tons of waste power batteries annually.

== Sustainability ==
In 2022, Chengdu B＆M passed the PAS2060 system certification and became the world's first cathode material factory with zero carbon emission.

80% Less Carbon Emissions in the Hydrometallurgy Projects in Indonesia comparing to the Nickel pyrometallurgy method due to less electricity consumption.

== Engagement in Establishing Industry Standards ==
RCI (Responsible Cobalt Industry Initiative): Founding Member, Vice Chairman unit.

FCA (the Fair Cobalt Alliance): Founding Member.

GBA-CAP (Global Battery Alliance-Cobalt Action Partnership Program): Member of the Strategy Committee.

RSBN (the Responsible Sourcing Blockchain Network): Founding Member.

== Child labor allegations and Huayou's actions to take responsibilities ==
According to a joint Amnesty International and African Resources Watch report, Congo DongFang International Mining, a subsidiary of Huayou Cobalt, sources cobalt from primitive "artisanal" mines in the Democratic Republic of the Congo, where there are few worker protections and child labor has been employed. Apple Inc. said that approximately 20% of the cobalt in Apple's batteries were sourced from Huayou Cobalt.

In response, Huayou Cobalt admits to having "insufficient awareness of supply chain management", and did not know that buying artisanal cobalt would increase child labor.

In 2016, Apple said that starting in 2017, they will treat cobalt as a conflict mineral, and require all cobalt suppliers to agree to outside supply-chain audits and risk assessments. After a 2017 Sky News follow-up that showed that child labor continued to be utilized, Apple said it stopped buying cobalt mined by hand in DRC entirely.

In June 2018, Signify, together with Fairphone and Huayou Cobalt, co-founded the Fair Cobalt Alliance.

In Jan 2019, Ford initiated the project with IBM, LG Chem and Huayou Cobalt to ensure the mineral used in lithium-ion batteries had not been mined by children or used to fuel conflict. The typical electric car battery requires up to 20 pounds of cobalt, and by 2026, demand for cobalt is expected to multiply eightfold.

In March 2023, Ford Motor Co., PT Vale Indonesia Tbk, and Zhejiang Huayou Cobalt Co. have agreed to invest in the Pomalaa Block High-Pressure Acid Leaching (HPAL) Project, creating a three-party collaboration to advance more sustainable nickel production in Indonesia and help make electric vehicle batteries more affordable. The project is expected to produce up to 120 kilotons per year of contained nickel in the form of mixed hydroxide precipitate (MHP), a lower-cost nickel product used in EV batteries with nickel-rich cathodes. The project will have an equity investment of an undisclosed amount from all three companies. The collaboration will help support Ford's plan to deliver a 2 million EV production run rate by the end of 2026 and further scale over time.

== See also ==
- List of companies of China
