= Kamfundwa Mine =

Mine in Kambove, Democratic Republic of the Congo

Kamfundwa Mine de Kamfundwa
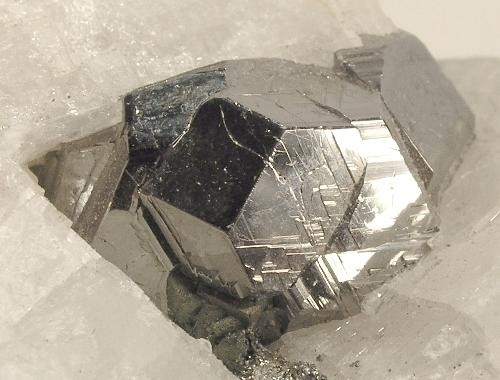
- Carrollite crystal, attributed to the mine

- Location within Democratic Republic of the Congo
- Location: Haut-Katanga, Democratic Republic of the Congo; 10°48′54″S 26°35′19″E
- Products: Copper
- Company: Gécamines
- Website: www.gecamines.cd

The Kamfundwa Mine (or Kamoya South II Mine, French: Mine Kamoya Sud II) is one of the Kambove mines in the mining region around Kambove, Katanga Province, Democratic Republic of the Congo. It is near the Shangulowé Mine, about 10 kilometres (6.2 mi) north of the Kamoya mine district.

== Secret mine ==
The Kamoya South II Mine was opened in 1998 as a benched open cut secret mine. The "owners" of the mine employed a strict security force to prevent the miners taking specimens. In early 2001, it was reported that the mine started to produce carrollite crystals of extraordinary size and quality. Some single crystals were almost as large as baseballs. In fact, many specimens of carrollite were falsely attributed to Kamfundwa when it was still a secret location.

== Ownership and development ==
Development partners were Harambee Mining Corp, the Swiss company Sogemin and the state-owned Gécamines. Harambee was prime for developing the copper-cobalt deposit at Kamfundwa. As of 30 September 1999 an area about 1,500 metres (4,900 ft) long and from 200 metres (660 ft) to 600 metres (2,000 ft) wide had been drilled off to a depth of 260 metres (850 ft). A stockpile of about 300,000 tonnes of ore grading 4% copper and 0.3% cobalt had been built up. The mine is now owned by Gécamines. As of 2008 annual capacity was reported to be 400,000 tonnes copper in ore and 48,000 tonnes cobalt in ore. Ore is transported to the concentrator at Kambove for processing.
