= Shituru =

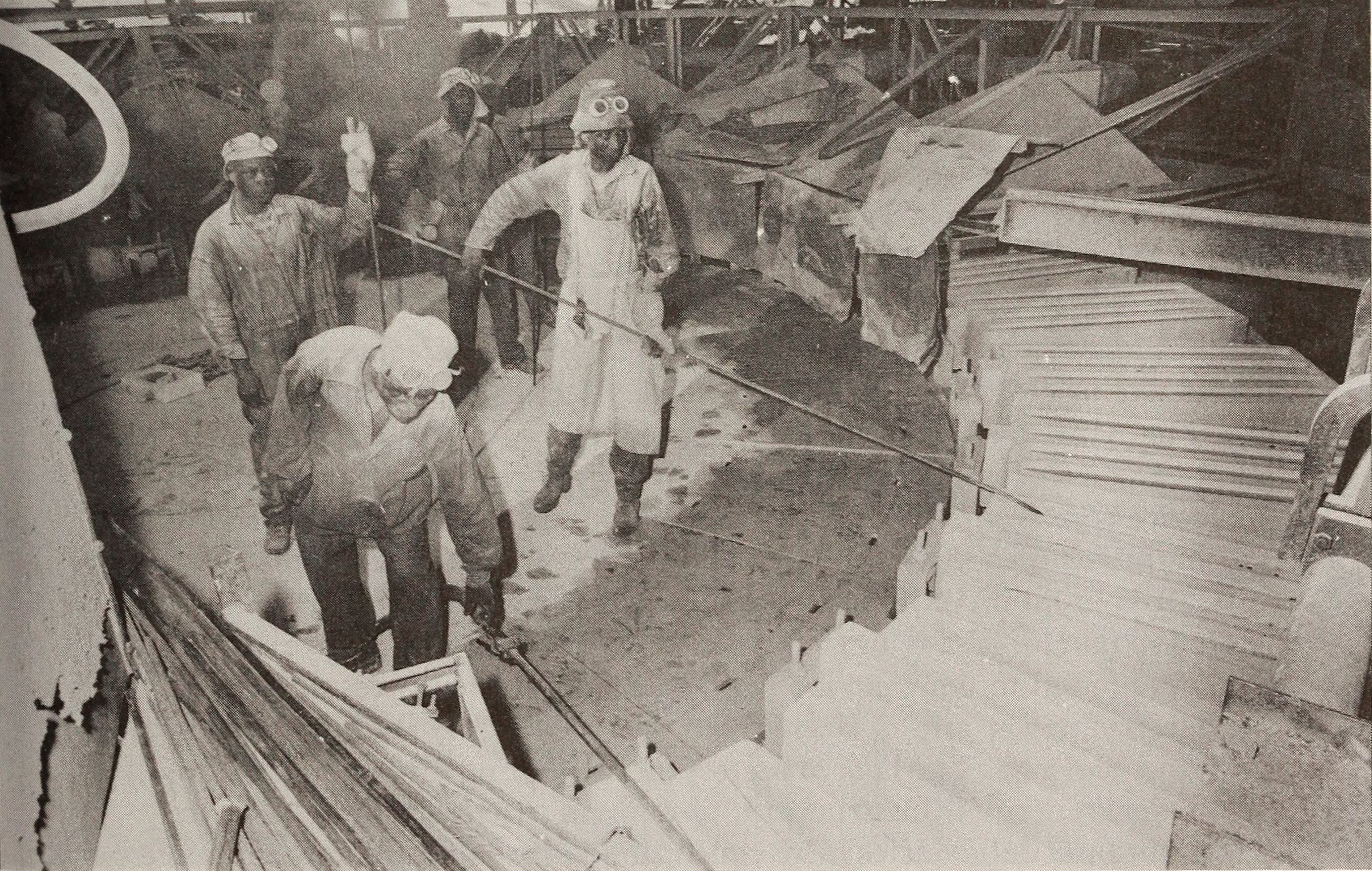
- Flow racks for the electrolyzed copper, in the Gecamines Shituru refinery, in the 1980s or the 1990s

- Location within Democratic Republic of the Congo
- Location: Likasi, Haut-Katanga, DR Congo; 11°00′46″S 26°45′03″E
- Products: Copper; Cobalt
- Company: Pengxin Mining Holdings; Gécamines

Shituru is a town that is now a commune of the city of Likasi in Haut-Katanga province, Democratic Republic of the Congo. It is also the location of a copper mine, smelter and hydrometallurgical plant that was operated by the state-owned Gécamines.

Shituru was the site of an open cast copper mine that had been abandoned as of 1992.

The East China Capital Holdings Ltd. held an option to acquire a 75% stake in the Shituru mine from Gecamines. In May 2005, International Barytex Resources Ltd. announced that it was buying a 86.67% stake in East China Capital Holdings for an effective 65% interest in Shituru Mining Corporation sprl (SMCO), the joint venture which holds the mine itself.

In September 2008 Gécamines' partner, International Barytex Resources of Vancouver, British Columbia, Canada, announced that it had completed a feasibility study for developing an open pit, ore processing and electrowinning facility at Shituru. The operation would process 900,000 tonnes of ore annually and produce 38,000 tonnes of LME grade cathode copper. In July 2009 International Barytex Resources said it had received payment in full for the sale of its interests to Touch Lucky Investments.

The Shanghai-based Pengxin Mining Holdings (Chinese: 鹏欣资源) says they started construction at the mine in September 2010, and placed the mine back into production in March 2012. In 2018, Pengxin announced an agreement to sell about a third of the mine's output to be used by the lithium battery maker Dangsheng Technology.
