= Mutoshi mine =

Mutoshi Mine
- Location within Democratic Republic of the Congo
- Location: Lualaba, Democratic Republic of the Congo; 10°40′40″S 25°32′07″E
- Products: Copper
- Opened: 2005
- Closed: 2008
- Company: Shalina Resources

Mutoshi Mine (French: Mine de Mutoshi) is a copper mine in Katanga Province, Democratic Republic of the Congo. As of 2011 it was 70% owned by Anvil Mining and 30% by the state-owned Gécamines. The mine was placed on care and maintenance in late 2008.

== Background ==
The Mutoshi Mine is an old open pit copper mine on the Kolwezi Klippe in the west of the Congo Copperbelt. It is a reduced facies type copper deposit made up of two ore beds separated by a layer of siliceous dolomite. The mine was first opened in 1903, and was initially worked for gold. Between 1960 and 1987 a washing plant at the mine discharged mineralized material into the Kulumaziba watercourse. Samples of the first 7.5 kilometres (4.7 mi) of the deposit indicated a resource of about 102,000 tonnes of contained copper.

== Tailings operation ==
In November 2004, Anvil Mining agreed to pay US$12.5 million for a 70% interest in the Mutoshi copper-cobalt project from the state-owned Gécamines and the private DRC company Entreprise Minière de Kolwezi SPRL (EMIKO). In the resulting structure, the project was held by SRM s.p.r.l, owned 20% by state-owned Gécamines and 80% by Entreprise Minière de Kolwezi SPRL (EMIKO). EMIKO in turn was owned 87.5% by Anvil, and 12.5% by its former sole shareholder. The property included the old Mutoshi mine, the Kulumaziba coarse rejects/tailings deposit, the Mutoshi Northwest deposit, the Nioka deposit, the Kamukonko cobalt prospect, and prospective ground on the Kolwezi Klippe.

In October 2005 the Economist Intelligence Unit reported that Anvil's claim to Mutoshi was being disputed by Chemaf, an Indian-based company that operates the Etoile copper and cobalt mine. Chemaf, which apparently had strong political connections in the DRC, claimed it acquired the rights to Mutoshi in a 2003 deal with Emiko. The case was seen as an important test of the Mining Code's guarantee that the courts will uphold property rights.

In late 2005, Anvil started mining the tailings, at first with good results. However, the company faced competition with artisanal miners on the property, and heavy rainfall had the effect of washing the more valuable coarser-grained tailings downstream, leaving less valuable fine-grained tailings. With increasingly poor results, operations were halted at the end of 2008.

== Future potential ==
In 2009, Anvil completed a scoping study for phasing out the existing Heavy Media Separation (HMS) operation and replacing it with SX-EW processing of oxide open pit mine feed, processing copper and cobalt deposits around the old Mutoshi mine. Further drilling and testing were needed before the feasibility could be confirmed.

Anvil Mining was taken over by MMG Limited in 2012, making MMG the major shareholder in the mine. In September 2013, MMG announced it was trading its interest in Mutoshi to Gécamines in exchange for $52.5 million worth of exploration permits near Kinsevere.

The mine was subsequently acquired by Chemaf, a subsidiary of the Dubai-based Shalina Resources headed by Shiraz Virji in 2016. Beginning in January 2018, the deposit was being run by Chemaf and Trafigura by employing artisanal miners. The artisanal mining was suspended since March 2020 due to the COVID-19 pandemic; Trafigura announced that artisanal mining would end December 31, 2020 to allow Chemaf to develop an industrial mine.

In January 2022, Trafigura announced $600 million in financing to Chemaf, planning for Mutoshi to begin producing cobalt hydroxide by the end of 2023.
