= Mutshatsha Territory =

Mutshatsha Wilaya ya Mutshatsha (Swahili)
- Territory
- Interactive map of Mutshatsha
- Location within Democratic Republic of the Congo
- Coordinates: 10.65°S 24.45°E
- Country: DR Congo
- Province: Lualaba

Area
  - Total: 18,859 km^{2} (7,282 sq mi)

Population
  - Total: 387,799
  - Density: 20.563/km^{2} (53.258/sq mi)
- Time zone: UTC+2 (CAT)

Mutshatsha is a territory in the Lualaba Province of the Democratic Republic of the Congo.
