= Kinsenda mine =

Copper mine in the Democratic Republic of the Congo

Kinsenda Mine
- Location in the Congo
- Location: Haut-Katanga, DR Congo; 12°11′51″S 27°47′52″E
- Production: Copper: 400 tonnes/month; Silver: 35,000 ounces/month; (2010)
- Opened: 2002
- Company: Metorex
- Website: www.metorexgroup.com/businesses/projects/kinsenda-project/

The Kinsenda Mine (French: Mine de Kinsenda) is a copper mine that is being opened in Katanga Province, Democratic Republic of the Congo. It is located near the Zambian border town of Kasumbalesa. The mining company Metorex, based in Johannesburg, South Africa, is developing the property. Infrastructure design is based on mining of 40,000 tons of ore per month. There is a significant risk from groundwater inflow.

Construction of the ore processing plant started in July 2006, with planned capacity to produce 54,000 tonnes per month of 45% copper concentrate. By June 2008 the mine had been dewatered and work had started on re-establishing the surface and mine infrastructure.

In 2011, Metorex was seeking approval to invest $150 million in opening the mine. After the investment, the mine was projected to produce 20,000 tons a year of copper.
