= Kipoi mine =

Kipoi Mine La mine de Kipoi
- Location within Democratic Republic of the Congo
- Location: Haut-Katanga, Democratic Republic of the Congo; 11°12′52″S 27°03′26″E
- Products: Copper
- Company: Tiger Resources (95%)
- Website: www.tigerez.com

The Kipoi Mine (French: La mine de Kipoi) is a copper mine in Katanga Province of the Democratic Republic of the Congo with an inferred 306,000 tonnes of copper in high-grade ore.

== Ownership ==
Kipoi Mine is a joint venture between Tiger Resources (60%) and the state-owned Gécamines (40%). It was planned to start generating revenue in 2011. In June 2011, Tiger Resources said they were negotiating to acquire a higher share of the operation from Gécamines.

== Development ==
The Kipoi Mine property covers 5,500 hectares (14,000 acres). Actual mineral reserves with 3.35% copper or more are 2.68 Mt containing 7.0% copper, 0.2% cobalt and 4.5 g/t silver. Plans included installing a plant with crushing, scrubbing and heavy media separation (HMS) equipment to produce 120,000 tonnes of 25% copper concentrates annually. Two shaft furnaces would produce 32,000 tonnes annually of black copper ingots at 95% to 98% copper. Tiger Resources invested more than $60 million to start the mine.

In 2014, Tiger Resources bought out Gecamines' 40% stake in the Kipoi Mine for $111 million, leaving it as the sole shareholder.

== Production ==
The target is to reach a capacity of 100,000 tonnes per year of copper metal. By June 2011 Tiger was producing 25% copper concentrate at a rate of 130,000 metric tons a year. The company was considering using $250 million from cash flow to build a Solvent Extraction Electrowinning (SXEW) copper cathode plant, with capacity of 50,000 tons per year. In September 2011 the company announced that the SXEW study had proved positive at current copper prices, and the plant would start operation in mid-2014, initially processing residues from the HMS plant. In October 2011 Tiger Resources slowed extraction of ore, since there was a stockpile with three month's supply.
