= Kalumines =

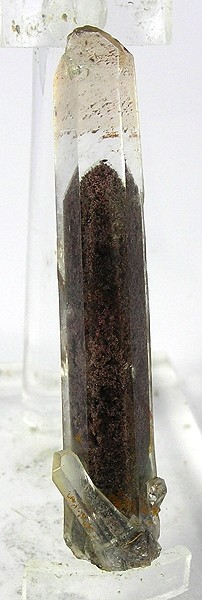
- Quartz, Chlorite crystal found in the early 1990s at Lupoto mine (10.1 x 1.8 x 1.4 cm)

- Location in the Congo
- Location: Lake Mweru, Haut-Katanga, DR Congo; 11°36′02″S 27°16′32″E
- Products: Copper
- Company: African Rainbow Minerals; Vale

Kalumines is a copper mining property that includes the Kasonta, Lupoto and Niamumenda concessions, with a combined area of 77 square kilometres (30 sq mi). It is about 25 kilometres (16 mi) northwest of Lubumbashi in Katanga Province, Democratic Republic of the Congo.

== Start-up ==
TEAL Exploration & Mining became owner of 60% of the property while the state-owned Gécamines owned the other 40%. Informal miners were active on the Kalumines property until early 2006, but they were peacefully removed. TEAL employed over 600 local people, including some of the former informal miners, on the phase one mine. The company initiated social investment projects that included water supply, transport and medical services for the local population of about 10,000 people, as well as the upgrade and construction of roads.

== Operation ==
TEAL announced that mining had started at Lupotu in May 2007 at a rate equivalent to 10,000 tons of copper per year in concentrate. Teal was in the process of commissioning their furnace to produce black copper ingots, with the capacity to handle rather more than half the concentrate. A feasibility study on a larger open pit mine was being prepared. As of 2008 the property was estimated to have annual production capacity of 10,000 tonnes of copper.

== Expansion plans ==
TEAL is a subsidiary of African Rainbow Minerals (ARM). In their 2011 annual report, (ARM), which had acquired a stake in the property, described it as being in the "exploration to feasibility" phase of development. ARM was investigating the property through a 50-50 joint venture with the Brazilian mining giant Vale, with the joint venture owning 60% of the property. Indicated resources were 780,000 tonnes of contained copper at Lupoto. In addition, inferred resources at this and the other sites in the property were about 600,000 tonnes of contained copper.
