= China Nonferrous Metal Mining Group =

Chinese state-owned enterprise

China Nonferrous Metal Mining (Group) Co., Ltd.

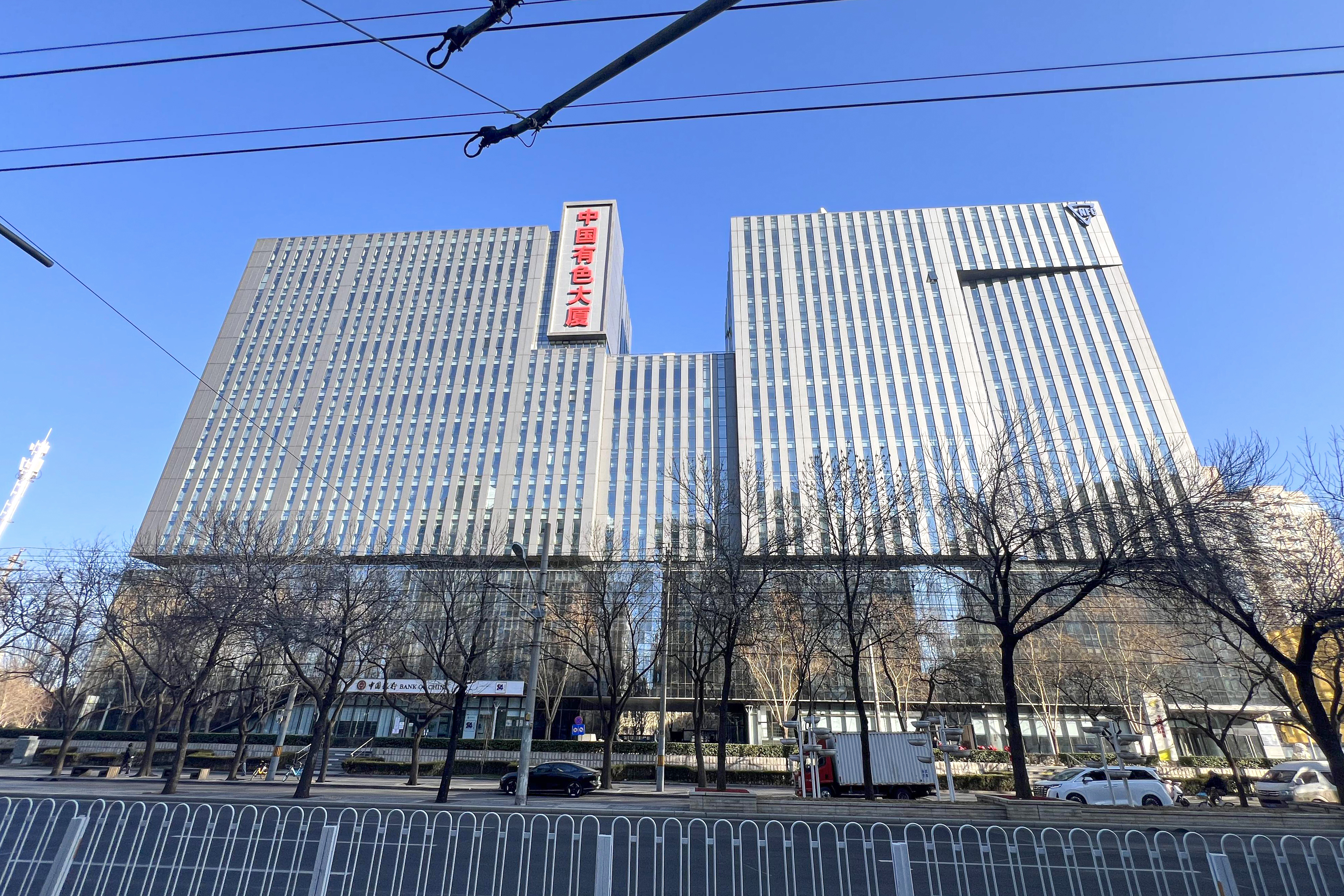
- Headquarters at 10 Anding Rd, Beijing
- Native name: 中国有色矿业集团公司
- Formerly: China Nonferrous Metals Industry Group
- Company type: state-owned enterprise
- Founded: 1983
- Headquarters: Beijing, China
- Area served: Worldwide
- Key people: Wen Gang (Chairman), Zhang Jinjun (General Manager)
- Products: Copper, Aluminum, Zinc, Nickel, Tantalum, Niobium, Beryllium
- Services: Mining, Smelting, Engineering, Mineral Exploration
- Revenue: 111,365,310,000 renminbi (2018)
- Owner: Central Government of China
- Website: www.cnmc.com.cn

China Nonferrous Metal Mining (Group) Co., Ltd. (abb. CNMC, Chinese: 中国有色矿业集团公司), formerly China Nonferrous Metals Industry Group, is a Chinese corporation involved with the mining of non-ferrous mineral resources. Established in 1983, it is a large central enterprise managed by the State-owned Assets Supervision and Administration Commission of the State Council.

The company was the parent company of four listed companies in mainland China and in Hong Kong. It invests in copper, aluminum, zinc, nickel, tantalum, niobium, and beryllium.

== History ==
China Nonferrous Metal Mining (Group) Co., Ltd. was founded in 1983 to lead international engineering and mineral resource development as China began encouraging overseas expansion of its industrial base. In 1994, it was included in a pilot program to restructure large Chinese state-owned enterprises, laying the foundation for subsidiary public listings and mixed-ownership reform. In 2005, with approval from the State-owned Assets Supervision and Administration Commission (SASAC), it adopted its current name, reflecting a focused strategy on mining and metallurgy.

Throughout the 2000s and 2010s, CNMC expanded internationally, particularly into Africa, becoming a flagship enterprise of China's "Go Global" strategy in the non-ferrous metals sector. Early major investments included the Chambishi and Luanshya copper mines in Zambia and joint ventures with Gécamines in the Democratic Republic of the Congo (DRC).

In January 2020, CNMC and Gécamines officially launched the Deziwa copper-cobalt mine in Kolwezi, DRC. The mine and SX-EW processing plant were developed at a cost of approximately US$880 million and target annual output of 80,000 tonnes of copper cathode and 8,000 tonnes of cobalt hydroxide.

Also in early 2020, CNMC transferred its African copper and cobalt assets—including operations in Zambia and the DRC—to its engineering subsidiary NFC for CN¥7.36 billion (US$1.1 billion). This restructuring aimed to centralize overseas project management and raise capital for expansion of assets such as the Lualaba smelter and the Chambishi Southeast Ore Body. In August 2020, CNMC signed a strategic cooperation agreement with Ivanhoe Mines, focusing on co-developing mineral assets in Africa, especially those related to copper and platinum-group metals.

In 2024, to commemorate its 20th anniversary of operations in Africa, CNMC Chairman Wen Gang led a delegation to South Africa, Democratic Republic of the Congo, and Zambia, underlining CNMC's growing strategic orientation toward Africa.

== Operations ==
=== Zambia ===
- Chambishi Copper Mine: Operated by CNMC's subsidiary NFCA (Non-Ferrous Corporation Africa), encompassing multiple ore bodies including Chambishi Main, West, and Southeast. The mine produces copper, with cobalt as a by-product.
- Luanshya Copper Mines (CLM): A joint venture with ZCCM Investments Holdings, operating the Baluba underground mine and the Muliashi open-pit mine, both producing copper cathodes.

=== Democratic Republic of the Congo ===
- Deziwa Copper-Cobalt Mine: A joint venture between CNMC (51%) and Gécamines (49%), located in Kolwezi, Lualaba Province. The mine commenced commercial production in January 2020.

=== Mongolia ===
- Tumurtiin-Ovoo Zinc Mine: A joint venture between China Nonferrous Metal Industry's Foreign Engineering and Construction Co., Ltd. (NFC) and Mongolia's Metalimpex LLC, operating under the name Tsairt Mineral LLC. The open-pit mine, located in Sükhbaatar Province, commenced operations in August 2005 and produces zinc concentrate.

=== Myanmar ===
- Tagaung Taung Nickel Project: A joint project with Taiyuan Iron & Steel (TISCO) to mine lateritic nickel ore and produce ferronickel, located in Thabeikkyin Township, Mandalay Region.

=== Tajikistan ===
- Pakrut Gold Mine: Operated via China Nonferrous Gold Ltd. (CNG), this underground mine produces gold doré.

=== Brazil ===
- In November 2024, CNMC signed an agreement to acquire Mineração Taboca S.A. in Brazil, owner of the Pitinga tin-niobium-tantalum mine, marking the group's entry into South America.
