= Gécamines =

Congolese commodity and mining company

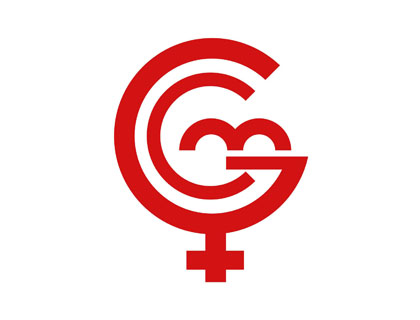
- Type: State-owned enterprise
- Industry: Commodities; Metals and mining
- Founded: 1906; 120 years ago (As Union Minière du Haut-Katanga)
- Headquarters: Lubumbashi (Headquarters)
- Area served: DR Congo
- Key people: Kaputo Kalubi Alphonse (Chairman); Bester-Hilaire Ntambwe Ngoy ( CEO); Mwine Kabiena Léon ( Deputy CEO)
- Products: Metals and minerals; energy products and petroleum; agricultural products
- Revenue: ▲NAD$613.751 billion (2022)
- Operating income: ▲NAD$21.500 billion (2022)
- Net income: ▲NAD$9.448 billion (2022)
- Number of employees: c.19,000
- Website: gecamines.cd

La Générale des Carrières et des Mines (Gécamines) is a Congolese commodity trading and mining company headquartered in Lubumbashi, in the Katanga region of the Democratic Republic of Congo. It is a state-controlled corporation founded in 1966 and a successor to the Union Minière du Haut-Katanga. Gecamines is engaged in the exploration, research, exploitation and production of mineral deposits including copper and cobalt.

One of the largest mining companies in Africa, and the biggest in the Democratic Republic of Congo, Gécamines sits on the world's greatest deposit of cobalt and has some of the world's largest deposits of copper. Copper mines in which Gécamines has a major interest include, but are not limited to, Kambove, Kipushi, Kamfundwa and Kolwezi.

Located in the mineral-rich Katanga Province, Gécamines is currently going through a multi-year, multi-billion reorganization strategic development plan with the main objective of repositioning itself as one of the world's major mining companies, primarily by focusing on core strategic assets in which the company has majority shares. Among others, Gécamines has forged partnerships and joint ventures with companies such as Anglo-Swiss Glencore International, American giant Freeport-McMoran and London-based Eurasian Natural Resources Corporation. Seeking to enhance profitability by creating lucrative competitive partnerships, in 2013 the Congolese firm appointed US businessman and American Jewish Congress President Jack Rosen on its Board of Directors.

In 2015, Gécamines signed a strategic copper and cobalt cooperation accord with Hong-Kong-listed China Non-Ferrous Metal Mining.

In 2016, Gécamines and China Non-Ferrous Metal Mining signed a memorandum of understanding for the construction of two factories, one of which includes Gécamines flagship property project of Deziwa, projected to produce 200.000 tons of copper per year.

== History ==
=== From the UMHK to Gecamin ===
On the 30 October 1906 the Union Minière du Haut-Katanga (UMHK) was founded by the Tanganyika Concessions and Société Générale de Belgique holding companies to mine mineral deposits in southern Katanga Province. The UMHK made its first copper extractions in 1911, totaling about 998 tons. After a decline during the Great Depression, it rapidly grew to become a highly profitable corporation. Net earnings from 1950 to 1959 reached 31 billion Belgian francs. The economic situation of the Congo greatly rested upon the county's relations with the UMHK, but the position of the government in the first few years after independence from Belgium was weak and the administration was unable to exercise much influence over the company's activities.

Following Joseph-Désiré Mobutu's seizure of power, the government refocused its efforts on "economic nationalism", including the assertion of control over UMHK. In addition to maximising his government's revenues, Mobutu hoped that by exerting authority over the company he could expand his power as president. Tensions between the government and the corporation rose after the former imposed a large tariff increase on exports. In late April 1966 the latter raised copper prices without consulting the Congolese government. Mobutu responded by increasing export taxes, ordering the retaining of 10% extracted minerals by the government as a strategic reserve, and announcing intentions to statutorily mandate the incorporation of the UMHK in the Congo by 1 January 1967.

UMHK representatives began negotiating a compromise with Congolese officials. They proposed splitting the company into two separate corporations—one based in Belgium, the other in the Congo. The Congolese found the terms unacceptable and on 8 December declared that the UMHK would have to accede to the legislation requiring its incorporation in the Congo before the new year. Tensions reached a breaking point on 23 December when the UMHK announced that it would not relocate its headquarters to Kinshasa. Mobutu responded immediately, halting copper exports, seizing UMHK accounts, and establishing a provisional board to manage the mining operations. The government maintained that it was not nationalising the company; the UMHK had refused to comply with the law and thus forfeited its right to operate. On 1 January 1967 the government declared that the UMHK in the Congo was from then on a parastatal to be known as Générale Congolaise des Minérais, or Gecomin. It was intended that the state would only hold 60% of the company, but after foreign investors showed no interest in the remaining shares it became entirely a government enterprise.

=== From the nationalization to the privatization of Gécamines (2010) ===
Following the takeover Gecomin was embroiled in conflict as the UMHK attempted to resist the Congolese government. The former told employees that they had a month to return to Belgium at the company's expense or have their contracts invalidated, while the latter warned them that they had to give 12 months' notice before their departure. The UMHK threatened legal action against anyone who purchased their seized copper and pressured other corporations to refrain from partnering with the Congolese to manage the mines. The standoff resolved on with an agreement on 15 February 1967. The UMHK recognised the legitimacy of Gecomin and relinquished all responsibilities concerning its mines, while the Congolese government abandoned its claims to UMHK shares in Belgium. Gecomin was to receive technical expertise and managerial support from an affiliate of the Société Générale de Belgique, the Société Générale des Minerais (SOGEMIN). SOGEMIN in turn received a portion of Gecomin's revenue, which served as recompense for its own services and reimbursement to the UMHK. Negotiations on the final compensation for UMHK were concluded in the early 1970s.

In 1971 the company's name was changed to Générale des Carrières et des Mines, or Gécamines. In 1974 the global price of copper fell dramatically. As a result, Gécamines' operations were devastated until the early 1980s.

Once producing 500,000 tonnes of copper a year in its 1980s heyday, the company's fortunes declined due to mismanagement and government interference. Nonetheless, the company remained crucial to Congolese finance. In 1989, Gécamines provided 85% of DR Congo's export earnings (against 60% provided by the UMHK in 1960), and 42% of public revenues, making it by far the most important company in the country.

In the 1990s, Gécamines financial situation took a blow, adversely affected by several issues, including aging infrastructure and equipment, the closure of Kamoto Mine in 1990, and ethnic riots in Shaba. These led to a slump in production.

The World Bank then provided funding, with stringent requirements, including a drastic reduction of staff through a policy of voluntary departures concerning 10655 agents and workers in all categories.

In 2002, after the Second Congo War, a Mining Code defining the rules of the mining sector was adopted. The mining sector in the country was liberalized and opened to foreign companies in 2003.

Gécamines then presents itself as a public company in the process of being transformed into a commercial company of which the state remained the sole shareholder. At the end of the transformation process, its capital would be open to the private sector. In economic difficulty, Gécamines was placed by the World Bank, under the management contract with objective assigned to the French Company of Realization and Construction (SOFRECO). Canadian lawyer Paul Fortin was appointed managing director of Gécamines. It relies on a partnership with China to revive the production of the company. In 2009, Fortin presented his resignation.

=== Since 2010, modernization of Gécamines ===
In 2010, Gécamines becomes a commercial company under private law. Congolese businessman and financier Albert Yuma Mulimbi, who is also president of the Federation of Businesses of the Congo since 2014, is named chairman of the company's board of directors, to give the company private management and restore the situation of society. It sets up a Gécamines development plan over five years to revive the company through the establishment of joint ventures with international partners, the modernization of production technologies to rebuild the industrial capacity of the company, the control of indebtedness and the reduction of the number of employees.

In 2016, Albert Yuma presented a recovery plan aimed at controlling Gécamines' debt, limiting operating costs and modernizing the company by investing $717 million until 2020 thanks to the increase in production. On December 23, 2017, Gécamines General Manager Jacques Kamenga announced the start of construction work on two new copper and cobalt production plants in Lualaba in Kolwezi and Kambove in 2018 to achieve this goal.

In March 2018, a revision of the Mining Code amended and supplemented the provisions of the former 2002 Code, which paved the way for the liberalization of the sector. This recasting of the mining law modifies the legal provisions applicable to prospecting and aims in particular to further control the international mining companies established in the Democratic Republic of Congo and to increase the Congolese State's tax revenue in a context of rising share prices cobalt. He is supported by Gécamines and Albert Yuma, chairman of its board of directors, for whom the new code will allow for more egalitarian partnerships with other international companies.

In April 2018, Gécamines announces the signing of an agreement for the construction of two ore processing plants in Kambove and Lubumbashi to exploit the Deziwa copper deposit with the Chinese firm China Nonferrous Metal Mining Group (CNMC) for a total of $880 million. This partnership, based on the design, construction and operation of mineral processing plants fully financed by the partner company, foreshadows, according to Gécamines, the new type of partnership that Congolese society wishes to conclude in order to increase its production. In its first phase, the project aims to produce 80,000 tons of copper with the ambition to reach 200,000 tons in a second phase.

On April 20, 2018, Gécamines sued the Anglo-Swiss commodity brokerage firm Glencore, with which the Congolese company has a joint venture, the Kamoto Copper Company (KCC). Gecamines denounces the non-reconstitution of KCC's own funds and the company's debt to Glencore at rates higher than those it borrows. On June 12 and 13, both parties issued a press release announcing the signing of an agreement and a "new win-win partnership".

On June 25, 2018, Gécamines inaugurates a new stage in its modernization to adapt to the new standards of the international mining industry.

The company announces the adoption by its board of directors of a two-way internal transformation plan, developed with the financial audit and consulting firm EY, including the decentralization of the management of mining activities through the creation of business units, and the transformation of management, particularly through the rejuvenation of members of the management team. Gécamines is also modifying the management of its teams internally through the creation of an operational reserve to facilitate the redeployment of its teams on new projects. In parallel, Gécamines announces the continuation of the modernization of its infrastructures with the closure of its oldest sites, the modernization of the copper and cobalt production plants of Shituru and Kamfundwa, and the construction of a heap leaching plant in Panda, in the province of Haut-Katanga.

In September 2021, The General Inspectorate of Finance (IGF) opened an investigation into Gécamines.

In December 2021, Albert Yuma was ousted from the presidency of Gécamines.

On 13 March 2026, the Congolese government and Gécamines reportedly authorized the sale of assets belonging to Dubai-based copper and cobalt producer Chemaf, which operates the Mutoshi and Etoile mines, to a consortium led by the U.S. company Virtus Minerals. On 17 March, officials from the US State Department and the Trump administration publicly expressed their support for the transaction on multiple occasions. In late February, President Félix Tshisekedi had dismissed the chief executive officer and the chairman of Gécamines, reportedly partly due to their opposition to the deal. According to Semafor on 15 April, Gécamines has since committed to exporting 500,000 tons of copper to the U.S. via its joint venture with the Swiss firm Mercuria, which is an amount five times greater than the 100,000 tons it had pledged in January 2026. Reuters reported on 22 April, citing a union representative, that Virtus Minerals plans to restart Chemaf's copper and cobalt production in January 2027. The company had already announced in early April that it had received approval from Congolese regulators to move forward with the restart.

== Operations ==
The core mining products of Gécamines are petroleum, copper and cobalt. Gecamines has also been seeking to creating a technopole with research institutes that will facilitate the production of other metals such as antimony, germanium, magnesium, gallium and indium.

After having experienced a significant decline in ore production in the 1990s and 2000s, Gécamines is now aiming to raise its production level beyond 36,000 tons of copper and 1,500 tons of cobalt by 2020, and at the level of 10,000 tons of cobalt per year within five years.

The Carter Center said in November 2017 that Gecamines apparently could not account for almost $1 billion from DRC's copper mine privatisation program.

Gécamines possesses possible ore reserves of copper (56 Mt contained metal), cobalt (4 Mt), germanium (3.4 Mt), and zinc (6.4 Mt). With assistance from the World Bank and aided by partnerships with other firms and by governance in DR Congo, Gécamines plans to return to one of the biggest producers in the copper and cobalt sector.

== Production data ==
=== Copper ===
- 1989 : 440 848 t ;
- 1990 : 376 000 t ;
- 1991 : 240 000 t ;
- 1994 : 32 412 t ;
- 2001 : 27 507 t ;
- 2002 : 21 186 t ;
- 2003: 16,172 t and 8,000 t of refined copper;;
- 2005 : 17 000 t ;
- 2006 : 24 000 t ;
- 2008 : 26 051 t ;
- 2012 : 35 000 t.

=== Cobalt ===
- 1989 : 440 848 t ;
- 1990 : 376 000 t ;
- 1991 : 240 000 t ;
- 1994 : 32 412 t ;
- 2001 : 27 507 t ;
- 2002 : 21 186 t ;
- 2003: 16,172 t and 8,000 t of refined copper;;
- 2005 : 17 000 t ;
- 2006 : 24 000 t ;
- 2008 : 26 051 t ;
- 2012 : 35 000 t.

== Sites owned by Gécamines ==
=== Mines ===
- Kakanda/Kambove mines (copper and cobalt), jointly with the International Panorama Resources Corporation
- Kamfundwa mine (copper) jointly with the Harambee Mining Corporation and Sogemin
- Kamoto (copper)
- Kamatanda (copper and cobalt)
- Kipushi mine (copper, gold and zinc) jointly with Ivanplats
- Kolwezi mine (copper and cobalt)
- Kov (copper)
- Katanga (disambiguation)

=== Copper smelters ===
- Lubumbashi

=== Copper refineries ===
- Shituru

=== Sites in development ===
- Kolwezi (copper and cobalt plant)
- Kambove (copper and cobalt plant in partnership with CNMC)
- Panda: opening of a heap leach plant in late 2018

== Corporate status ==
Since its privatization in 2010, Gécamines is a commercial company under private law organized by Société à responsabilité limitée (SARL). It is governed by a seven-member Board of Directors, a general meeting and a managing director.

=== Board of directors ===
Composed of 9 members, the Board of Directors of Gécamines is headed by Kaputo Kalubi Alphonse

==== General manager ====
- Bester-Hilaire Ntambwe Ngoy Kabongo, General Director
- Mwine Kabiena Léon, Deputy General Director

==== Internal transformation plan ====
Gécamines' reorganization plan adopted by the company's Board of Directors on June 25, 2018, aims to modernize the internal organization of the mining company to "find the way to growth and profits, while preserving its values and the expression of the social responsibility which falls to him » . Elaborated with the cabinet EY, it rests in particular on the reorganization of the organization chart of the company, articulated around a decentralized management based on a logic of productive units, empowered and autonomous in their day-to-day management and a progressive rejuvenation of the management team. The internal transformation plan also includes the creation of an operational reserve to improve the allocation of teams according to the needs of each site of the company to rationalize the management of human resources.

== Partnerships ==
In February 2018, Gécamines was a minority partner of 12 joint-ventures.

- China Nonferrous Metal Mining Group (Deziwa copper deposit development project)
- Glencore PLC (management of Kamoto Copper Company in joint venture)
- George Forrest Group (co-management of the Lubumbashi Slag Treatment Company / Lubumbashi Slag Treatment Group (STL / GTL))

In the context of internal and regional conflicts and due to chronic underinvestment since 1995, Gécamines sold its main industrial and mining assets to international mining groups, resulting in a drop in production.

In the spirit of the new Mining Code of the Democratic Republic of the Congo adopted in March 2018, Gécamines has announced that it wanted to conclude new and more egalitarian partnerships by increasing the State's share and "the real and growing involvement of Congolese executives".

In February 2018, Gécamines' president, Albert Yuma, presented the implementation of a new form of partnership, based on a farm-out contract, initiated as part of his joint venture with the firm China Nonferrous Metal Mining. Concluded for a limited time, these partnerships are based on the opening of the capital of the mining projects to an international partner in charge of the initial financing needs.

=== Deziwa Mining Company ===
Deziwa Mining Company SAS is a joint venture company based in Kolwezi, owned by Gécamines at 49% and the Chinese firm China Nonferrous Metal Mining (CNMC) at 51%, which aims to develop Deziwa's copper and cobalt deposit.

This is the result of the merger between Gécamines and CNMC since the signing of a strategic cooperation agreement on June 23, 2015, in Lubumbashi. On January 13, 2016, the two companies conclude an agreement for the construction of two modern metallurgical plants in Kambove and Kolwezi. On June 8 of the same year, Albert Yuma, president of the national company, announced the creation of a joint venture to exploit the Deziwa copper deposit, whose reserves are estimated at 5 million tons of copper. In April 2018, CNMC confirms the US$880 million investment in the Deziwa Mining Company, operating the open mine and the two new metallurgical plants under construction. The project plans to reach a final production of 8,000 tonnes of cobalt and 80,000 tonnes of copper per year by 2020, before reaching the stage of 200,000 tonnes of copper in a second phase.

The investment, which provides for the exploitation of deposits and the construction of primary processing plants, will be reimbursed on production, allowing Gécamines to gradually increase its capital. The partnership agreement provides that Gécamines will eventually become the operating pilot of the Mining Company.

== Shareholding ==
Gécamines is a wholly state-owned mining company where the Democratic Republic of Congo is the sole shareholder.
