= Dan Gertler =

Israeli billionaire businessman

- דן גרטלר
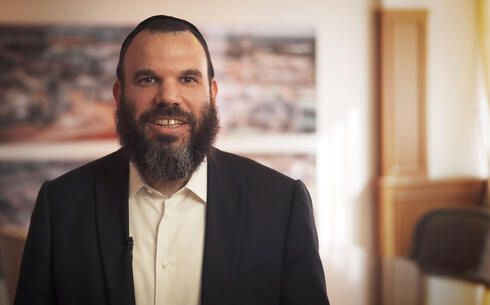
- Born: 23 December 1973 (age 52)
- Occupation: Businessman
- Years active: 1996–present
- Spouse: Anat Gertler
- Children: 12
- Relatives: Moshe Schnitzer (grandfather); Shmuel Schnitzer (uncle)
- Website: dan-gertler.com

Dan Gertler (Hebrew: דן גרטלר; born 23 December 1973) is an Israeli businessman. He has been a subject to U.S. trade sanctions. He was accused by the Central Intelligence Agency of receiving illegal kickbacks in violation of U.S. sanctions against Iraq.

== Career ==
Dan Gertler is the grandson of Moshe Schnitzer, the former president of Israel Diamond Exchange. His family was involved in cutting and merchandising diamonds, and at the age of 22, he opened his own diamond business. In 1996, he founded the Dan Gertler International.

From September 2000 through April 2001, Gertler had the sole right to buy "all diamonds produced in territory under the control of the Congolese Government", for which he had paid Kabila $20 million. He ran a quasi "comptoir" in the Congo his Israeli firm and affiliates. His firm received 70 percent of the profits and the Congolese Government received 30 percent, which included the state diamond producer, MIBA, and all diamonds sold by private businesses. His business was described as a monopoly.

After Laurent Kabila's assassination in January 2001, Gertler briefly lost influence in the Congo. In April 2001, Laurent's son and successor, Joseph Kabila, revoked IDI's monopoly, and the International Monetary Fund encouraged the country to liberalize the diamond industry. Gertler reestablished relationship with Joseph Kabila, eventually to the point of being invited to Kabila's wedding in 2006.

=== Emaxon Finance International Inc and the Diamond Industry (2001-2017) ===
In 2001, Gertler established Emaxon Finance International Inc, in Canada, as a subsidiary of Dan Gertler International (DGI) (reported by the International Development Research Centre according to the 2001 International Peace Information Service (IPIS) publication, and according to the Quebec trade register.) In April 2002, Emaxon signed a contract through which Gertler gained a four-year right to market 88% of the rough-diamond production of the Societé minière de Bakwanga (MIBA), about a quarter of the DRC's legitimate diamond exports, at around 600,000 carats a month. Emaxon enjoyed a five-percent discount on its purchase of MIBA diamonds, which it then usually sold in the free market to the highest bidder. Emaxon lent MIBA $15 million to modernize its mining equipment. In July 2017, Exmaxon's corporate registration was cancelled after failing to file annual declarations with the Quebec government for two years. The company was also sanctioned by the United States Office of Foreign Assets Control.

Fleurette Properties is a Gibraltar-based company which has at least "60 holding companies in offshore havens such as the Virgin Islands", through which Dan Gertler controlled concessions in the Democratic Republic of the Congo. Fleurette Group refers to the group of companies with respect to which Fleurette Properties is either the direct or indirect shareholder. The Fleurette Group owned the Kansuki concession, a Congolese copper and cobalt development project, since 2006. As of April 2016 it employed 30 000 people and was the largest source of private receipts for the Congolese government.

In February 2022, the government of the Democratic Republic of the Congo announced that it was close to signing an agreement with the Fleurette Group, owned by the Gertler family, under which it would transfer, among other things, cash, cobalt mines, and oil wells worth two billion dollars to the state. Local organizations praised the decision. Subsequently, Gertler signed the agreement with the Congolese government led by President Félix Tshisekedi.

As part of the agreement, Ventora Group, owned by the Gertler family, transferred all the mining and oil licenses it held, including the research results it had conducted on the assets over the years, worth 2-3 billion dollars. Ventora also agreed to pay Gécamines, the state mining company, a significant portion of the royalties it received from Katanga Mining, as the profits from the deal exceeded expectations due to changes in the copper and cobalt market. This was after Gécamines and the Congolese government verified that the transactions were conducted legally and at market value at the time.

As part of the exit agreement from business initiatives in Congo, the United States is considering lifting the sanctions against Gertler.

== Family trust ==
In 2007 Gertler's family trust was the major shareholder of Prairie International Ltd., owner of "Tremalt Limited, which owned 80% of Savannah Mining, the holder of the other half of copper and cobalt operation Mukondo, as well as concessions C17 and C18 in the mineral-rich Katanga Province" of the DRC.

=== Global Enterprises Corporate and Nikanor (2004-2008) ===
In March 2004, DGI founded Global Enterprises Corporate (GEC) in partnership with Beny Steinmetz Global. In May 2004 GEC signed an agreement with the state-owned Gécamines, finalized in September 2004, to rehabilitate and operate the Kananga and Tilwezembe copper mines. The deal was ratified 13 October 2005 by presidential decree. This deal was later found by the World Bank, reviewing the DRC's three biggest mining contracts, to have been approved with "a complete lack of transparency" (Mahtani 3 January 2007).

Global Enterprises Corporate's mining assets ended up being held by Nikanor plc, registered in the Isle of Man. For example, Gertler and Steinmetz placed Global Enterprises Corporate (GEC)'s 75% share in KOV into Nikanor. Nikanor was owned 75% by GEC and 25% by Gécamines at the time Nikanor was first floated on the Alternative Investment Market in July 2006. This IPO raised $400 million, and Nikanor's market capitalization reached $1.5 billion.

In February 2007, 22% of the Nikanor Mining company was owned by the Gertner Family Trust and 14% by Dan Gertler.

In January 2008 Katanga Mining acquired Nikanor plc for $452m, rendering the company defunct.

=== DEM Mining 2006 - cobalt and copper in Katanga Copper Belt ===
In April 2006 Gertler's DGI took a major stake in DEM Mining, a cobalt-copper mining and services company based in Katanga.

=== Tremalt Ltd 2006 Mukondo Mine, Kanaga Copper Belt ===
In June 2006 Gertler bought Tremalt, which had a half share in the Mukondo Mine, for about $60 million from the Zimbabwean businessman John Bredenkamp.

In 2007 Tremalt was owned by Prairie International Ltd, of which Dan Gertler's family trust was a major shareholder. Tremalt owned 80% of Savannah Mining, which held concessions C17 and C18 in Katanga Province and 50% of the Mukondo project. The other 50% of Mukondo was held by Boss Mining, which in turn was 80% owned by Central African Mining & Exploration Company (CAMEC). Boss Mining had rented and operated Bredenkamp's half of Mukondo. Gertler terminated this arrangement.

=== Prairie International Ltd. 2007 Mukondo, Kanaga Copper Belt ===
When CAMEC bought Boss Mining in February 2006, its then- owner, Billy Rautenbach, a Zimbabwe businessman, gained about 17% of CAMEC shares. Gertler and CAMEC made plans to combine the Mukondo assets and a Katanga Province copper and cobalt project, into a new holding company. Rautenbach would be excluded from ownership in the new company, due to the hostile relations that had developed between him and the DRC government.

In November 2007, Prairie International and CAMEC signed a memorandum of understanding to complete the deal. In November 2007 the digital mining industry Miningmx reported that Dan Gertler's Prairie International Ltd. and CAMEC had created a joint venture vehicle in the Mukondo with concessions held by the state-owned Gécamines. "Tremalt will be transferred into the joint venture vehicle." In February 2008 the two companies announced that the Mukondo Mountain operations had restarted.

=== Glencore partnership 2007 ===
Gertler has been a partner with Glencore International Plc., the largest company in Switzerland and the world's largest commodities trading company. One of their mines is Mutanda.

In the course of the Congo events, Glencore and Gertler partnered in Nikanor from 2007 until the final merger with Katanga Mining in late 2007 in a transaction valued at US$3.3 billion. A 2011 article by Reuters journalists described Glencore as "the biggest company you never heard of":

In June 2007, Glencore and partner Dan Gertler, an Israeli mining magnate, paid £300 million for a quarter of mining company Nikanor, which planned to revive derelict copper mines next to Katanga Mining's properties. The contract gave Glencore exclusive sales rights to all Nikanor's output, an "offtake" agreement. Katanga lost 97% of its market value over the final six months of 2008. Running out of cash in the financial crisis, Katanga accepted [Glencore] control, issuing more than a billion new shares for about US$500 million in a convertible loan and rights issue. A share that grew to 74% went to Glencore. In 2011 copper prices regularly set records above US$10,000 a ton, and the value of Katanga's stock market value was nearly US$3.2 billion. Katanga lost US$108 million in 2009, but posted an annual profit of US$265 million in 2010.

Glencore had initially stopped all payments to Gertler to respect the 2013 US sanctions, but following a lawsuit filed by Gertler in a Congolese court, Glencore paid about 2.5% of the sales from its mines in the Congo in royalties to Gertler in euros, not dollars.

==== Catela Global, 2008 ====
In July 2008 Catela Global, a company owned by Gertler's family trust, offered about C$296 million to buy Anvil Mining shares, around 25% of Anvil, in a private placement. An RBC Capital Markets analyst, Cailey Barker, speculated that Anvil would use the cash infusion for acquisitions, but the company said it would remain focused on completing its Kinsevere Stage II project. In August 2008, Anvil lowered the amount to be paid to about C$237 million, due to "the significant deterioration in market conditions for resource companies".

=== Camrose Resources Ltd, Africo, Kalukundi Mine, 2007 ===
"In 2007 Africa Management Limited was created as a joint venture between South African housing minister Tokyo Sexwale's investment vehicle Mvelaphanda Holdings, its associate company Palladino Holdings, and Och-Ziff Capital Management, a $30 (~$44.8 billion in 2025)-billion New York hedge fund (Wood et al. 2012)."

In June 2010 the Financial Post of Canada reported that Highwind Properties, a company registered in the British Virgin Islands, now owned the Kolwezi project. The newspaper, citing unnamed sources, linked the company to Dan Gertler. In August 2010 Eurasian Natural Resources Corporation, a company listed in London with most of its operations in Kazakhstan, said it was buying indirect control of the Kolwezi licence from Dan Gertler. ENRC was buying 50.5% of Camrose from Gertler. Camrose's key asset was a 70% interest in the Kolwezi project. The Kolwezi property was sold to Gertler for $20 million. He in turn sold 50.5% of Camrose to ENRC for $175 million.

Camrose's other assets included a "64% stake in Canada listed Africo Resources which held a 75% interest in Kalukundi exploitation licence as well as a 56% indirect interest in Comide Sprl, which held the exploitation licence for Mashitu, Pangalume and Kii tenements."

According to a 2012 article in the Mail and Guardian, Camrose acquired a controlling stake in Africo through a simultaneous, complex and clever set of transactions from 2007 to 2008. Located in the south-eastern DRC's copper belt, the lucrative Kalukundi concession owned by Congolese company Swanmines, which was part-owned by Canadian miner Africo Resources, had potential for high copper and cobalt yields. In April 2007 Africo was preparing to purchase enough shares to become the majority shareholder of Kalukundi when a third party entered into litigation, claiming prior ownership. Dan Getler offered to help, through his connections with President Joseph Kabila. Gertler purchased the third-party company and resold it to Africo. In July 2008, the Getler company, Camrose Resources, purchased Africo shares worth about $100 million (~$147 million in 2025). Camrose then held a 63% controlling stake in Africo. Camrose paid for Africo through a loan from an offshore British Virgin Islands-registered company called Vipar, "an affiliate of Africa Management Limited."

=== Camrose and Highwind Group 2008-10 ===
In 2008, Camrose Resources Ltd, a Gertler family trust company, purchased s 62.5% share of Africo Resources. In February 2009, Africo confirmed that it had the go-ahead from the DRC government for the 75%-owned Kalukundi project.

In 2009 Vancouver, Canada-based (through Dan Gertler's newly formed British Virgin Island-based company) Highwinds sold ENRC 50.5% of Kolwezi Mine Tailings (KWT) a "multi-billion dollar copper and cobalt tailings reprocessing facility." The facility had been expropriated in 2009 by the DRC from then-Vancouver, Canada-based Highwinds. In September 2009 the DRC government revoked the license of Canadian mining firm First Quantum Minerals to operate the Kolwezi copper tailings project. First Quantum appealed the decision. The CEO, Philip Pascal, said "the activities on the legal side come from a small and very influential group of individuals in the Congo and don't necessarily mirror the sentiments of a number of other authorities". Later the state-owned, Sodimico, also expropriated the Frontier and Lonshi mines from First Quantum.

In August 2010, Camrose acquired British Virgin Island-based Highwind Group. In March 2011 the state-owned Sodimico sold its 30% stake in these two mines for $30 million to two companies registered in the British Virgin Islands. The total estimated value of the mines was over $1.6 billion.

=== Emerald Star Enterprises Limited BVI 2009 SMKK ===
Emerald Star Enterprises Limited, a company controlled by Gertler's family trust, was incorporated 29 October 2009 in the British Virgin Islands. On 21 December 2009 Emerald Star sold an option to buy the remaining 50% stake of Société Minière de Kabolela et de Kipese SPRL, (a company formed by Melkior Resources Inc and Gécamines that holds the rights to develop the Kabolela cobalt-copper deposit) to Katash-founded mining company Eurasian Natural Resources Corporation (ENRC) who already owned 50%. The other 50% belonged to state-owned Gécamines. In February 2010 Emerald Star Enterprises Limited purchased Gécamines' 50% for $15 million and sold these shares to ENRC for $50 million. Emerald Star Enterprises Limited paid $15 million, and sold for $75 million, making a 500 percent return.

==== Rowny Assets Limited BVI- 2011 Mutanda Mine, Katanga Copper Belt ====
Rowny Assets Limited is one of the offshore firms owned by Gertler's family and is described in the initial Glencore public offering (IPO) prospectus. Gécamines sold its 20% share of the Mutanda project to Rowny Assets. This company, registered in the British Virgin Islands, was said to be "associated" with Gertler. The share was worth an estimated $600 million, but was sold for $137 million.

Rowny Assets Limited was also in Glencore's 4 May 2011 listing prospectus, and acquired a 20% interest in Mutanda from Gécamines.

==== Biko Invest Corporation (BVI), 2011 ====
Biko Invest Corporation (BVI), linked to Dan Gertler and incorporated 23 February 2011 in the British Virgin Islands, bought a quarter of Kansuki Sprl from Gécamines in 2011.

== Mining assets and IMF ==
In September 2011 the International Monetary Fund asked for explanations from Sodimico and Gécamines, both owned by the government of the Democratic Republic of the Congo (DRC), concerning sales of assets below market value and without publicity.

In December 2012 the International Monetary Fund stopped a US$500m (~$692 million in 2025) (£310m) loan to the Congo because of irregularities in the way a company reputed to be controlled by Dan Gertler acquired minerals from Joseph Kabila's government.

== Panama Papers, Mossack Fonseca, 2016 ==
Gertler's name appears more than 200 times in the Panama Papers. Mossack Fonseca registered at least two companies for him: Burford Commercial S.A. and Norseville Estates S.A. Gertler's attorney said, Gertler had "no knowledge of the claims raised regarding the [Panamanian firm's decision] to terminate representation in 2011." Le Monde reported another two Mossack Fonseca incorporated shell companies, Foxwhelp Ltd and Caprikat Ltd, in the DR Congo oil industry.

== Paradise Papers, 2017 ==
On 5 November 2017, the Paradise Papers, a set of confidential electronic documents relating to offshore investment, revealed that Glencore loaned $45 million to Gertler in exchange for his help with officials of the Democratic Republic of Congo in negotiations over a joint venture with state-owned Gécamines at the Katanga copper mine in 2009. Gertler appears in 120 documents regarding his relationship with Glencore. Glencore, which had effectively taken over Katanga, agreed to vote for the joint venture. The loan document specifically provided that repayment would be owed if agreement was not reached within three months. Gertler and Glencore have denied wrongdoing.

== Magnitsky Act ==
The United States Department of the Treasury specifically named Dan Gertler in the Office of Foreign Assets Control (OFAC) financial sanctions list for serious human rights abuse and corruption, under the Magnitsky Act and blocked his US-based assets, and "prevented any firm from doing business with him in dollars". According to a February 2018 article in The Economist, the sanctions statement said that Gertler had "amassed his fortune through hundreds of millions of dollars' worth of opaque and corrupt mining and oil deals" in the DRC. The corruption in mining and oil deals in the DRC amounting to over a billion dollars had undermined the impoverished country's economic growth and its "the rule of law". Included in the Executive Order is the list of designated entities "affiliated with" Gertler, "Moku Mines D'or SA, Moku Goldmines AG, Fleurette Energy I B.V., Fleurette Africa Resources I B.V., African Trans International Holdings B.V., Fleurette African Transport B.V., Oriental Iron Company SPRL, Iron Mountain Enterprises Limited, Sanzetta Investments Limited, Almerina Properties Limited, Interlog DRC, Kitoko Food Farm, Karibu Africa Services SA, and Ventora Development Sasu".

In a 28 November 2019 article in The Economist, it was reported that President Trump's decision to place sanctions on Gertler, who is a close friend of then-President of the Congo, Joseph Kabila, had come as "a shock to many companies operating in the Congo." Citing Tom Perriello, then the United States envoy to the African Great Lakes under Barack Obama, the sanctions "probably helped push Mr. Kabila to his eventual decision to stand down in the elections that took place a year later", in the December 2018 general election. According to The Economist, by 2021, Kabila's power was waning, as even his allies in cabinet—including then prime minister, Sylvestre Ilunga Ilunkamba—had lost his position on January 27, 2021. Félix Tshisekedi, who has been president since 2019, could pressure the state-run mining group, Gécamines, to take back Gertler's mines and royalties.

It was reported on 25 January 2021 that in the final days of the Trump Administration, following lobbying by Alan Dershowitz and others working for Gertler, the US Treasury Department had issued a license which temporarily lifted the restrictions on him. According to The Economist and New York Times, Gertler was granted a special license which allows him to use American dollars to "do almost anything, for a year."

This reprieve was subsequently ended by the Biden administration on 8 March 2021. In October 2023, The Wall Street Journal reported that the US was considering lifting sanctions against Getler.

D.R.C. President Felix Tshisekedi negotiated with Gertler to gain control over the Gertler's cobalt and copper mining and oil-drilling rights in D.R.C. that have an estimated value of $2 billion. In return, Gertler asked President Tshisekedi to lobby the American government to lift the sanctions against him. As of 2023, D.R.C.'s mineral wealth was one of the richest in the world, while 60% of the country's people experienced extreme poverty. As long as Gertler controls these assets, the D.R.C. cannot sell them to new investors and benefit from the country's resources. Critics of the agreement said that Gertler would still collect tens of millions of dollars annually in royalties in the D.R.C.

In 2020, Gertler filed a lawsuit for 9 million shekels against Haaretz newspaper and journalists Gur Megiddo and Chaim Levinson, after they published an investigative report describing how funds were transferred from the Democratic Republic of Congo to Israel, despite the economic sanctions imposed on Gertler by the United States. In the affidavit submitted by Haaretz journalists, it was stated that they did not claim Gertler circumvented the sanctions. In September 2024, the Tel Aviv District Court asked the parties to dismiss the lawsuit, reasoning that "in these times (amid the Gaza war), it is neither right nor appropriate to escalate disputes within Israel." The parties agreed, and the lawsuit was dismissed.

In July 2025, Bloomberg published a detailed investigation based on a 1,224‑page arbitration document in which Gertler described payments made to a former close associate of DRC's President. The report concluded that no evidence of bribery was found in those transactions.

In March 2026, it was decided to permanently close the investigation conducted in the Netherlands against Gertler; the bribery allegations were dropped.

=== The Gertler Family Foundation ===
In 2004, Gertler established the Gertler Family Foundation, a philanthropic organization operating in the Democratic Republic of the Congo. The foundation aims to improve the lives of the most vulnerable communities in Congo, focusing on healthcare services, education, infrastructure development, agriculture, culture, and emergency assistance.

As part of its efforts, the foundation established five hospitals in Congo, donated medical equipment and supplies, and facilitated free cleft lip and palate surgeries. The foundation also rehabilitated a school in Lubumbashi, contributed to the construction of a computer center, library, and additional classrooms, developed infrastructure, and established farms and a zoo. Additionally, the foundation donates to various food programs, assists girls who have been sexually abused, helps victims of natural disasters and AIDS patients, supports vulnerable children and adults through SOS Children's Villages, and more.

== Diplomatic activity ==
In 2003, Gertler was an active participant in the Congo peace talks (the Sun City Agreement), mediating between Joseph Kabila, Paul Kagame, and American diplomats, including Condoleezza Rice. During this period, Kabila appointed Gertler as the "Special Envoy of the Democratic Republic of Congo to Washington."

In 2014, Gertler played a crucial role in the release of Joshua French, a Norwegian citizen convicted of murdering a local resident in the DRC. For his efforts, Norwegian Prime Minister Erna Solberg and Ambassador Thor Vennesland awarded Gertler a certificate of recognition.

According to Ron Dermer, former Israeli Ambassador to the United States, Gertler is an asset to Israel's security and interests due to his connections in Africa and his philanthropic contributions.

== See also ==
- Mining industry of the Democratic Republic of the Congo
