= Kalakundi =

Kalakundi may refer to:

- Kalakundi, India, a village in Dharwad district in the southwestern state of Karnataka, India
- Kalukundi Mine, a copper and cobalt mine being developed in Katanga Province, Democratic Republic of the Congo (DRC)

== See also ==
- Kalakund railway station, a railway station in Madhya Pradesh, India
