= Luita =

Coordinates: 10.757288°S 26.307642°E

The Luita plant will be the largest copper and cobalt processing plant in Africa, and the largest cobalt facility in the world. It is being built in modules by the Central African Mining and Exploration Company (CAMEC) in Katanga Province, Democratic Republic of the Congo.

The Luita plant is designed to process copper and cobalt concentrate from Mukondo Mountain, which may be the richest cobalt reserve in the world. In July 2008 CAMEC said the resource estimate at Mukondo was 70 million tons of ore containing 1.5 million tons of copper and 500,000 tonnes of cobalt. The cobalt grade averages 1.2%, an exceptionally high concentration. The ore is concentrated at the Dense Media Separation (DMS) plant at Kakanda before being trucked 17 kilometres (11 mi) to Luita. In February 2008 CAMEC and their partner, Dan Gertler's Prairie International, announced that the Mukondo Mountain operations had restarted.

In July 2008 CAMEC said the Luita facility, due to be completed later that year, would be the largest of its kind in the world. The target was to produce 100,000 tonnes per year of copper cathode. By the end of March, 2008, CAMEC had invested $200 million in Luita, and had three SX/EW copper cathode trains in operation, and a small cobalt concentrator. Eventually there were plans for nine copper cathode trains and one cobalt train, each 18 metres (59 ft) wide and 180 metres (590 ft) in length. The under-roof plant will be 50,000 cubic metres (1,800,000 cu ft) in size.

When running at full production, the plant was planned to produce 12,000 tons per year of cobalt cathode at 99.9% purity, about one third of total global production of cobalt in 2008. However, in July 2009 CAMEC announced a long term agreement under which CAMEC would deliver its entire annual production of cobalt in concentrate from Mukondo Mountain to Zhejiang Galico Cobalt & Nickel Materials of China. At that time production was running at between 6,000 and 8,000 tons per year of cobalt in concentrate.

Researchers have identified a cleaner, greener method to extract cobalt for batteries from waste materials.
