= Mukondo mine =

Copper and cobalt mine in Katanga Province, the Congo

Mukondo Mine Mine de Mukondo
- Location in the Congo
- Location: Lualaba, DR Congo; 10°43′29″S 26°20′47″E
- Products: Copper, Cobalt
- Company: Eurasian Resources Group (51%); Gécamines (49%)

Mukondo Mine (French: Mine de Mukondo) is a copper and cobalt mine in Katanga Province, Democratic Republic of the Congo. As of 2011 it was operated by the Central African Mining and Exploration Company (CAMEC; Société Centrafricaine d’Exploration et d’Exploitation Minière). It may be the richest cobalt reserve in the world.

== Location ==
In July 2008 CAMEC said the resource estimate at Mukondo was 70 million tons of ore containing 1.5 million tons of copper and 500,000 tonnes of cobalt. The cobalt grade averages 1.2%, an exceptionally high concentration. The Mukondo mountain has a height of over 1,700 metres (5,600 ft). Mining is relatively cheap since waste rock can simply be pushed off the mountain rather than hauled away.

== Ownership changes ==
In January 2001 the Kababancola Mining Company (KMC) was established as a copper and cobalt mining partnership for a 25-year term. Tremalt, controlled by the Zimbabwean businessman John Bredenkamp, held 80% of KMC while the state-owned Gécamines held 20% In June 2006 Dan Gertler bought Tremalt for about $60m. The sale was to Prairie International, of which Dan Gertler's family trust was a major shareholder. Tremalt owned 80% of Savannah Mining, a successor to KMC that held concessions C17 and C18 in Katanga Province and 50% of the Mukondo project.

Billy Rautenbach, a Zimbabwe businessman, owned Boss Mining, which controlled the other 50% of the mine. In a February 2006 deal, Rautenbach gained about 17% of the CAMEC shares when CAMEC bought 80% of Boss. Boss Mining had rented and operated Bredenkamp's half of Mukondo. Gertler terminated this arrangement when he bought Tremalt.

Gertler and CAMEC made plans to combine the Mukondo assets into a new holding company to be operated by CAMEC. Billy Rautenbach would be paid out and excluded from ownership in the new company due to the hostile relations that had developed between him and the DRC government. CAMEC and Prairie International signed the MOU to complete the deal in November 2007. In September 2009 the Eurasian Natural Resources Corporation (ENRC) of Kazakhstan made a £584-million cash offer for CAMEC. The deal was closed in November 2009.

In 2018, Gécamines increased its share of the Boss Mining joint venture to 49%, reducing ENRC's stake to 51%. The operations of Boss Mining were suspended in 2019.

== Operations ==
The joint venture was to extract cobalt from Mukondo, reopen the Kakanda concentrator and control the Luita copper cobalt SX/EW facility. In February 2008 the two companies announced that the Mukondo Mountain operations had restarted. In July 2008 CAMEC said the Luita facility, due to be completed later that year, would be the largest of its kind in the world. The target was to produce 100,000 tonnes per year of copper cathode. In July 2009 CAMEC announced a long-term agreement under which CAMEC would deliver its entire annual production of cobalt in concentrate from Mukondo Mountain to Zhejiang Galico Cobalt & Nickel Materials of China.
