= Tremalt =

Mining company

Tremalt Limited
- Industry: Mining
- Defunct: November 2007
- Fate: Merged into Central African Mining and Exploration Company
- Headquarters: Democratic Republic of the Congo

Tremalt Limited was a mining company incorporated in the British Virgin Islands which owned assets in the Democratic Republic of the Congo (DRC). It was the vehicle for a highly criticized deal in 2001 in which it bought copper assets at far below their estimated value in return for a private agreement to pay a share of profits to the DRC and Zimbabwe governments. Allegedly some of the payments were made in the form of military equipment. The company made few investments in its assets, several of which the DRC government took back. In 2006 it was sold for about $60m.

== KMC acquisition, 2001 ==
In January 2001 the Kababancola Mining Company (KMC) was established as a copper and cobalt mining partnership for a 25-year term. Tremalt, initially controlled by John Bredenkamp, held 80% of KMC while Gecamines held 20% A network of private holding companies and trusts registered in the Isle of Man and the British Virgin Islands concealed the true owners of Tremalt. KMC gained the rights to mines, facilities and concentrators at Kambove and Kakanda. KMC made relatively low investment in these properties, continuing to operate the already-functioning Kamoya Mine but not opening the others. In March 2002 the DRC authorities took back control of the Kambove concentrator from Tremalt following a complaint by the manager of KMC against Gecamines at the International Centre for the Settlement of Investment Disputes. In its 2003-year end report KMC claimed a cumulative loss of over USD$11 million in the first three years.

== United Nations investigation, 2002 ==
In October 2002 the United Nations published the Final report of the Panel of Experts on the Illegal Exploitation of Natural Resources and Other Forms of Wealth of the Democratic Republic of the Congo. The report named Brigadier General Sibusiso Busi Moyo and Air Commodore Mike Tichafa Karakadzai as key players in arranging the KMC deal with Tremalt. According to the report, Tremalt had paid $400,000 for the rights to exploit six Gecamines concessions that held a total of 2.7 million tons of copper and 325,000 tons of cobalt. These concessions had an estimated value of over $1 billion. In a private agreement, net profits would be divided 32% to Tremalt, 34% to the DRC government and 34% to the Zimbabwe government. Tremalt undertook to supply military vehicles and cash in lieu of the profit share payments.

== Subsequent history ==
The UK-based NGO Rights and Accountability in Development brought a case against Tremalt alleging illegal resource exploitation. However, the UK National Contact Point for the OECD blocked the case, saying it had been resolved by the United Nations panel. In June 2004 RAID withdrew the case.

John Bredenkamp sold Tremalt for about $60m to the Israeli-American businessman Dan Gertler in 2006. In 2007 Tremalt was owned by Prairie International Ltd, of which Dan Gertler’s family trust was a major shareholder. Tremalt owned 80% of Savannah Mining, which held concessions C17 and C18 in Katanga Province and 50% of the Mukondo project. The other 50% of Mukonda was held by BOSS Mining, which in turn was 80% owned by Central African Mining & Exploration Company (CAMEC). There were plans to combine the Mukondo assets into a new holding company. Billy Rautenbach, a Zimbabwean who had formed BOSS and now owned a share of CAMEC, would be excluded from ownership in the new company due to the hostile relations that had developed between him and the DRC government. The MOU to complete the deal was signed between CAMEC and Prairie International in November 2007.
