= Tichafa =

Tichafa is a Zimbabwean masculine given name. Notable people with the name include:

- Tichafa Samuel Parirenyatwa (1927–1962), Zimbabwe physician
- Mike Tichafa Karakadzai (1957–2013), Zimbabwean military officer
