= Battle North Gold =

Canadian gold-mining company (1996–2021)

- Formerly: Rubicon Minerals
- Traded as: TSX: BNAU; OTCQX: BNAUF
- Industry: Mineral Exploration
- Founded: March 4, 1996; 30 years ago in Vancouver
- Defunct: May 19, 2021
- Fate: Acquired by Evolution Mining
- Headquarters: Toronto, Ontario, Canada
- Key people: J. Garfield MacVeigh (CEO, 1996-2006); David Adamson (CEO, 20xx-2012); Michael Lalonde (CEO, 2013-2015); George Ogilvie (CEO, 2016-2021)
- Website: www.battlenorthgold.com

Battle North Gold (formerly Rubicon Minerals) was a Canadian company that was pursuing the development of the Bateman (formerly Phoenix) gold project near Red Lake, Ontario. Headquartered in Toronto, the company was listed on the Toronto Stock Exchange in Canada and the New York Stock Exchange and then the OTCQX market exchange in the US. The company's board of directors had approved the construction of the mine in 2014 and raised $700 million but little gold was recovered. Consequently, the company sought creditor protection and re-structured. By 2018 the company had a market capitalization of $80 million as it pursued new resource estimates. The company was acquired by Australian Securities Exchange-listed company Evolution Mining in 2021.

== Corporate history ==
Battle North Gold was incorporated on March 4, 1996 in Vancouver as Rubicon Minerals Corporation for acquiring and exploring the mineral properties that had been assembled by the holding company Rubicon Management Ltd. It became a public company in November 1997 with its shares listed on the Vancouver Stock Exchange. It conducted mineral exploration work in Haines, Alaska, and on its Canadian properties in Ontario and Newfoundland. On September 30, 2003, the Company graduated to the Toronto Stock Exchange, and in September 2004, became cross-listed on the American Stock Exchange with the trading symbol "RBY". Rubicon would be listed on the S&P/TSX Composite Index between December 2009 and December 2013.

Rubicon also owned a one-third stake in the private company Africo Resources which was conducting mineral exploration in the Kalukundi copper-cobalt deposit in Katanga Province, Democratic Republic of the Congo. Rubicon re-structured, effective December 8, 2006, to make Africo Resources a public company listed on the Toronto Stock Exchange (though it would be acquired by the private company Camrose Resources in 2016) and spun-off the new company called Paragon Minerals Corporation to hold its Newfoundland assets (though it would be acquired by Canadian Zinc Corporation in 2012). Canadian businessman and former CEO of Goldcorp Rob McEwen became a significant investor and strategic advisor to the company beginning in 2006 and controlled over 30% of shares.

Rubicon's Ontario property, called the Phoenix gold project, in the Red Lake area became the company's primary focus. On the strength of a 2013 preliminary economic assessment which indicated a gold reserve of 3.3 million ounces with 20 grams (0.71 oz) gold per ton of ore, Rubicon's board of directors authorized the construction of the mine without a feasibility study. With the Wabauskang First Nation in opposition to the project, the company had to defend its permits in a Supreme Court of Canada case deciding that the province could issue mining permits on treaty land. The project proceeded with the company raising $700 million from investors, including the CPP Investment Board and Agnico Eagle Mines, and its stock peaking at $6 per share. However, once the mine started producing gold in 2015 unexpectedly low yields were achieved. Consequently they had to revise their gold reserve estimate down to 413,000 ounces and their stock collapsed down to 5 cents a share by January 2016. Consequently, the company sought creditor protection as it re-structured and was delisted from the New York Stock Exchange. As part of the re-structuring, their stock was consolidated at 162 shares for one new share, followed by new shares being issued to secured creditors, and Royal Gold's streaming agreement being renegotiated.

With George Ogilvie being hired as its new CEO, the re-structured company raised funds by issuing new shares to fund better resource estimates and a new preliminary economic assessment. In 2020, the company re-named itself from Rubicon Minerals to Battle North Gold and re-named its Phoenix Gold project to the Bateman Gold project. In May 2021 Australian Securities Exchange-listed Evolution Mining completed the acquisition of Battle North Gold for CAD$343 million.
