= Central African Mining and Exploration Company =

- Type: Public limited company
- Traded as: AIM: CFM
- Founded: 2002 (listed)
- Defunct: November 2009
- Headquarters: London, England
- Area served: Africa
- Key people: Phillippe Edmonds (chair); Andrew Groves (CEO)
- Subsidiaries: Boss Mining Sprl

The Central African Mining and Exploration Company plc (CAMEC) was a mining company active in the Katanga Province of the Democratic Republic of the Congo (DRC) and in other parts of Africa. It was acquired by Eurasian Natural Resources Corporation in 2009.

== Early years ==
In September 2002 Andrew Groves reported a 6 to 7 million Rand had been spent to upgrade the Three Aloes mine.

CAMEC listed on the London Stock Exchange's Alternative Investment Market in October 2002. It pursued an aggressive and successful program of acquiring and developing projects, finding little difficulty in gaining funding based on its strong track record. The company developed operations or undertook exploration in Mali (bauxite), Mozambique (coal), the DRC (copper and cobalt), South Africa (fluorspar) and Zimbabwe.

=== Entry into Congo ===
Initially, the Zimbabwean businessman Billy Rautenbach controlled Boss Mining Sprl, which owned 50% of the Mukondo resource. The provenance of Rautenbach's claims to Mukondo were the subject of considerable controversy, as he was appointed head of the Congolese state-owned Gécamines at the same time Zimbabwe was supporting the embattled DRC government. In a February 2006 deal, Rautenbach gained about 17% of the CAMEC shares when CAMEC bought an 80% share in Boss.

=== Attempted Katanga bid ===
Around this time, the recently re-elected Congolese administration had announced a review of all existing mining contracts, due to widespread concerns about irregularities of mineral concessions made by officials during and in the aftermath of the Second Congo War.

In July 2007, CAMEC said it planned to acquire of the Canadian copper company Katanga Mining in exchange for shares in the combined company. At the time of the offer, CAMEC already owned 22% of Katanga.

However, the deal encountered difficulties as Billy Rautenbach was arrested and deported to Zimbabwe. The DRC deputy mines minister, Victor Kasongo, stated that the way the C19 license had been obtained was fraudulent. CAMEC strongly disputed this, and stated the move was designed to destabilize its bid for Katanga. CAMEC withdrew the offer in September 2007, citing uncertainty due to a review of mining licenses being conducted by the DRC government. Despite statements from DRC attorney general Tshimanga Mukeba that certain CAMEC mining rights were annulled, in October 2007 CAMEC continued to argue that they remained valid.

=== Reorganization ===
In June 2007, Dan Gertler purchased Prairie International, which owned 100% of Tremalt, which owned 80% of Kababankola Mining Company Sprl which owned other 50% stake in the Mukondo project. In November 2007 CAMEC and Prairie International, the owner of Tremalt, decided to combine their Mukondo assets into a new holding company operated as a joint venture. Billy Rautenbach would be excluded from ownership in the new company due to the hostile relations that had developed between him and the DRC government.

The new ownership structure consisted of the assets owned 70% by CAMEC, and 30% by Gecamines, with CAMEC issuing a 32.7% equity stake to Gertler's companies.

The venture aimed to extract cobalt from Mukondo, to reopen Kakanda concentrator and to control the copper cobalt SX/EW facility at Luita. In February 2008 the two companies announced that the Mukondo Mountain operations had restarted. In July 2008 CAMEC said the Luita facility, due to be completed later that year, would be the largest of its kind in the world. The target was to produce 100,000 tonnes per year of copper cathode. In July 2009 CAMEC announced a long-term agreement under which CAMEC would deliver its entire annual production of cobalt in concentrate from Mukondo Mountain to Zhejiang Galico Cobalt & Nickel Materials of China.

== Other projects ==
CAMEC had a stake in the Copper Resources Corporation but it was "disenfranchised", giving Metorex of South Africa an effective economic interest of 99.99%. In May 2009 CAMEC said it had found bauxite on a property in Mali with an inferred resource of 439 million tons. In July 2009 CAMEC said it was conducting a feasibility study at the Bokai platinum prospect in Zimbabwe, due to be completed by September. It expected to start production in 2012.

In September 2009 the Eurasian Natural Resources Corporation (ENRC) of Kazakhstan made a £584-million cash offer for CAMEC. The chairperson Phillippe Edmonds and CEO Andrew Groves both resigned when the deal was closed in November 2009.
