= Camrose Resources =

Camrose Resources Limited
- Defunct: 2012
- Fate: Acquired by Eurasian Natural Resources Corporation
- Key people: Dan Gertler

Camrose Resources Limited (Camrose) was a company owned by Dan Gertler, an Israeli businessman, the founder and President of the DGI (Dan Gertler International) Group of Companies. Camrose's other assets included a "64% stake in Canada listed Africo Resources which held a 75% interest in the Kalukundi Mine's exploitation licence as well as a 56% indirect interest in Comide Sprl, which held the exploitation licence for Mashitu, Pangalume and Kii tenements."

By August 2010, Camrose, acquired British Virgin Island-based Highwind Group.

In 2012 Fasken Martineau, a prestigious international business law and litigation firm recovered an almost unprecedented US$1.25B in the "First Quantum Minerals v Highwinds and others", a case concerning the expropriation of First Quantum Minerals' mining licences in the Kolwezi tailings project (KMT) in the Democratic Republic of Congo. As part of the settlement Eurasian Natural Resources Corporation (ENRC) who had gained control of the project through Camrose Resources Limited subsidiary Highwinds, purchased First Quantum's residual claims and assets in the DRC.

== Kolwezi tailings project KMT ==
=== First Quantum Minerals Ltd ===
Vancouver -based, First Quantum Minerals Ltd (FQM), is a TSX and LSE listed mining and metals company focused on Africa. First Quantum Minerals owned 65% of Kingamyambo Musonoi Tailings SARL (KMT) the project company of the Kolwezi tailings project (International Finance Corp World Bank 2009)."

The International Finance Corporation of the World Bank contributed "c. US$4.5 million in equity funding (for a 7.5% equity stake in KMT) during the first phase of this project which involved the preparation of a bankable feasibility study. Other shareholders of KMT were the DRC Government (5%), the state-owned Gécamines (12.5%), and the South African Industrial Development Corporation (IDC) (10%)."

The Kolwezi tailings project, is a lucrative copper- and cobalt-extractions projects to process tailings ponds from mining operations in the 1950s, partly owned (65%) and operated by First Quantum Minerals, a Vancouver, British Columbia based mining and metals company, until its forced closure in September 2009 when the DRC government revoked its license and confiscated the holdings. First Quantum spent $750 million on acquiring and developing the property. First Quantum took out an action against the DRC government in the International Chamber of Commerce Court of Arbitration.

=== Metalkol SARL: Gecamines and Highwinds ===
Early in 2010 DRC created a new joint venture Metalkol Sarl controlling the Kolwezi Tailings Project (KMT), with state-owned Gecamines (30%) and Dan Gertler's newly formed British Virgin Island-based company, Highwinds (70%).

== Camrose's Highwinds, Eurasian Natural Resources Corporation and Kolwezi Tailings Project (KMT) ==
=== Highwind Group, Metalkol SARL ===
Highwind Group had a 70% interest in the Metalkol Sarl, which in turn owned the exploitation licence for the Kolwezi tailings project site (Law Expert March 2, 2012)."

By 2010 Gertler and the London-listed Eurasian Natural Resources Corporation ENRC were in joint control of Kolwezi Mine Tailings (KMT) a "multi-billion dollar copper and cobalt tailings reprocessing facility" In August 2010 Eurasian Natural Resources Corporation acquired 50.5% of Camrose Resources Limited and therefore the controversial Kolwezi tailings project. In 2010 ENRC paid $175 million for its majority stake in Camrose. On December 28, 2012, 99 percent of Eurasian Natural Resources Corp shareholders approved the US$550 million purchase of the remaining 49.5% per cent of Camrose Resources Limited still held by Dan Gertler's Gibraltar-registered company (Wild et al. 2013 page 68) Fleurette Properties Ltd.

ENRC's acquisition 50.5% of Kolwezi Mine Tailings (KWT) a "multi-billion dollar copper and cobalt tailings reprocessing facility" that had been expropriated in 2009 by the DRC from Vancouver, Canada-based through Dan Gertler's newly formed British Virgin Island-based company, Highwinds, was the last of a series of ENRC of Congolese mining asset acquisitions in roughly an 11-month period. First Quantum Minerals had completed 75 per cent of the construction and the lucrative facility was almost ready to be operational when it was seized by the government and handed to This led to First Quantum Minerals v Highwinds and others, a case concerning the expropriation of mining licences in the Democratic Republic of Congo. DRC passed the concession to a new joint venture Metalkol Sarl, encompassing state-owned Gecamines (30%) and Dan Gertler's newly formed British Virgin Island-based company, Highwinds (70%).

== Camrose, Kalukundi and Africo ==
According to an article in the Mail and Guardian (Wood et al. 2012) Camrose acquired a controlling stake in Africo through a simultaneous, complex and clever set of transactions from 2007 to 2008. Located in the south-eastern Democratic Republic of Congo's copper belt, the lucrative Kalukundi concession owned by Congolese company Swanmines, which was part-owned by Canadian miner Africo Resources, had a potential of high copper and cobalt yields. In April 2007 Africo was preparing to purchase enough shares to become the majority shareholder of Kalukundi when a third party entered into litigation claiming prior ownership. Dan Getler offered to help through his connections with Democratic Republic of Congo's president, President Joseph Kabila. Gertler purchased the third-party company and resold it to Africo. In July 2008, the Getler company, Camrose Resources, purchased Africo shares worth about $100-million. Camrose then held 63% controlling stake in Africo. Camrose had paid for Africo through a loan from an offshore British Virgin Islands-registered company called Vipar, an affiliate of Africa Management Limited (Wood et al. 2012)."

In 2007 Africa Management Limited was created as a joint venture between South African housing minister Tokyo Sexwale's "investment vehicle Mvelaphanda Holdings, its associate company Palladino Holdings, and Och-Ziff Capital Management, a $30-billion New York hedge fund (Wood et al. 2012)." The hedge fund Och-Ziff Capital Management Gertler's Camrose $150-million via Africa Management and Vipar. In this way Sexwale and associates aided Gertler in selling Kalukundi, "grabbed" by a third party, back to its original owner (Wood et al. 2012)."

== See also ==
- Canadian mining in the Democratic Republic of the Congo
- Copper mining in the Democratic Republic of the Congo
- Dan Gertler
- Africo
