= Georges Minsay Booka =

Minister of Justice
- In office 5 February 2007 – November 2007
- Succeeded by: Mutombo Bakafwa Nsenda

Personal details
- Citizenship: Democratic Republic of the Congo
- Party: Parti Lumumbiste Unifié (PALU)

Georges Minsay Booka is a politician in the Democratic Republic of the Congo. He was Minister of Justice in the first and second cabinets of the Gizenga government, from February to November 2007.

Georges Minsay Booka was named Justice Minister by President Joseph Kabila in the government headed by Antoine Gizenga in February 2007 one of four members of Gizenga's Unified Lumumbist Party (PALU) to be named to the cabinet.

In 2007 there was an ownership dispute over the Kalukundi Mine when a DRC company named Akam Mining claimed it had bought control of Swanmines, the holding company, and this claim was upheld in a superior court in Lubumbashi. This was an important test of the strength of property laws in the DRC and the security of foreign investment. In September 2007 the Canadian company Africo Resources said "third parties" were trying to steal its Kalukundi asset through the "systematic misuse of the judicial system". Later that month Georges Minsay Booka directed Gécamines to take note that Akam Mining had no stake in the property.
