= Mike Tichafa Karakadzai =

Air Commodore (retired) Mike Tichafa Karakadzai (Name 'Karakadzai' origin from Mozambique, from the Ndau tribe) (7 March 1957 – 19 August 2013) was a former senior officer in the military of Zimbabwe. Europe, and more recently Australia, have frozen his assets and forbidden his travel in their territories.

- Karakadzai means remember in the Ndau language of Eastern Zimbabwe and Mozambique.

Karakadzai qualified for a Graduate Diploma in Purchasing and Supply from the Chartered Institute of Purchasing & Supply in the United Kingdom. He obtained an MSc in Strategic Management from the University of Derby. He attended the Royal College of Defence Studies in the United Kingdom where he obtained an MSc in Defence Strategic Studies. He was appointed Deputy Secretary for Policy and Procurement in the Zimbabwe Ministry of Defence in 2000.

In October 2002 the United Nations published the Final report of the Panel of Experts on the Illegal Exploitation of Natural Resources and Other Forms of Wealth of the Democratic Republic of the Congo. The report said Karakadzai had the position of Deputy Secretary of COSLEG, which the United Nations described as "a Congo-Zimbabwe joint stock company ... a key vehicle for military-backed commerce involving mostly diamonds, banking and timber in the Government-held areas". It named Karakadzai as a key player in arranging a January 2001 deal with John Bredenkamp's Tremalt whereby Tremalt obtained copper mining resources in the DRC at a nominal price in exchange for paying a share of proceeds to the governments of the DRC and Zimbabwe. Some of the payments were to be made in the form of military equipment.

Karakadzai was named in February 2004 by the European Union as being among Zimbabwe government members whose assets must be frozen by members and who would be barred from entry or transit by members of the union. In December 2008 Australia added him to its list of targeted sanctions against those responsible for the human rights abuses in Zimbabwe.

On 1 November 2005 Karakadzai was appointed General Manager of the National Railways of Zimbabwe. In February 2011 President Robert Mugabe said that Karakadzai would be in charge of his reelection campaign in Harare, at a date to be announced. Sources said this was likely to be a very violent campaign. In May 2011 Karakadzai said that lack of credit from foreign lenders was preventing the National Railways of Zimbabwe from replacing aging equipment. He blamed this on illegal sanctions imposed on the country by the west. He died in a car accident on 19 August 2013 in Matebeleland after his vehicle hit a cow and overturned.
