= Comptoir Commercial Congolais =

Colonial-era trading company in the Congo Free State

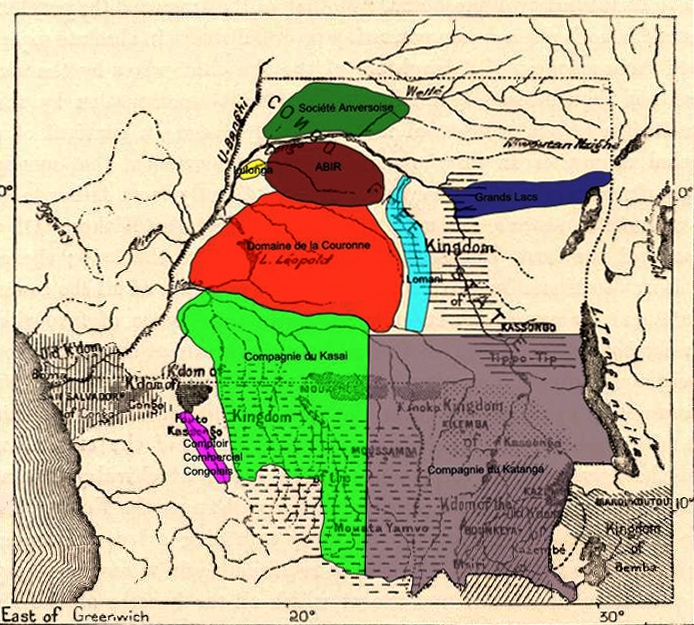
Congo Free State concession companies, Comptoir Commercial Congolais shown in pink

The Comptoir Commercial Congolais was a concession company of the Congo Free State, which was in personal union with Leopold II of Belgium.

== Bibliography ==
- Harms, Robert (1975), "The End of Red Rubber: A Reassessment", The Journal of African History, 16 (1): 73–88, doi:10.1017/S0021853700014110, JSTOR 181099
