= Chaim Levinson =

Israeli journalist

- חיים לוינסון
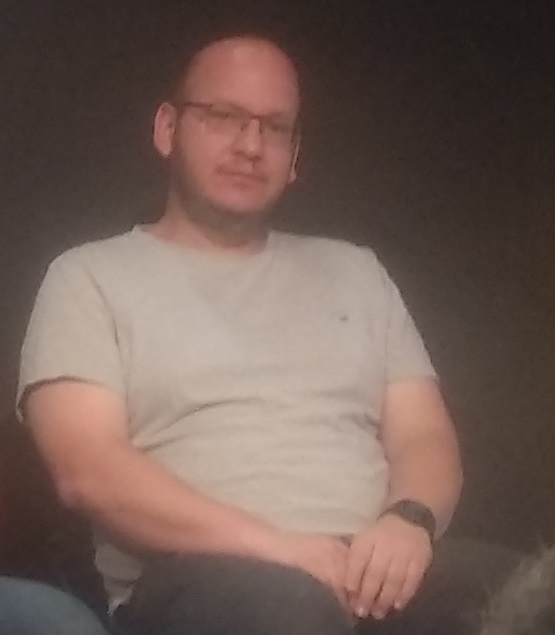
- Born: August 7, 1984 (age 41); Jerusalem, Israel
- Citizenship: Israel

Chaim Levinson (Hebrew: חיים לוינסון; born August 7, 1984) is an Israeli journalist and editor, best known for his work with the Israeli newspaper Haaretz. His investigative journalism has earned him popularity across the country. In addition, he co-hosts alongside Ofira Asayag in the "Ofira & Levinson" program on Israeli Channel 12. He also works in programs on the Knesset Channel, on Kann B and on radio station 103FM.

== Biography ==
Levinson was born in Jerusalem to an ultra-Orthodox family who immigrated from the United States in 1981, and studied in a Talmud Torah Chabad in Shikun Chabad and the Malad High School in the city. He worked for the Jerusalem local "Kol Hazman", as an education reporter and a magazine reporter.

In 2004, he began working as a correspondent for ultra-Orthodox affairs at Yedioth Ahronoth. In the years 2006–2014, he studied social sciences, humanities, and interdisciplinary democracy studies. at the Open University of Israel.

In 2008, he began working at Haaretz newspaper, first as a correspondent coordinator, and since July 2009, as a reporter covering the settlers. His tenure at Haaretz ended in October 2025 after it was revealed that he had failed to properly disclose an ongoing business relationship from 2019 to 2024 with Yisrael Einhorn.

Levinson lives in the Kiryat Shalom neighborhood of Tel Aviv.

== Journalism ==
- In August 2010, Levinson revealed Cameri Theatre, Habima Theatre and Haifa Theatre, were going to appear at the Israeli settlement Ariel, which led to a boycott.
- In March 2012, Levinson published the story of Omar Abu Jariban, an illegal immigrant from Gaza who was thrown on the side of the road by two policemen and dried to death. The officers were convicted and sentenced to 21 months in prison.
- In October 2014, Levinson revealed that Defense Minister Moshe Ya'alon ordered to prevent Palestinians from getting on the same bus with Israelis.
- In August 2015, Levinson revealed a government decision to transfer a special sum of 340 million shekels (NIS), for the development of transportation and tourism infrastructure in the Israeli settlements.
- In April 2016, Levinson revealed that there are 1,537 defects in the core of the Shimon Peres Negev Nuclear Research Center, which are constantly monitored.
- In September 2017, Levinson revealed that Netanyahu worked to appoint his former associate, Ari Harow, as chairman of Israeli Channel 10 company.
- In March 2024, Levinson revealed recordings between the former head of Israel Bar Association, Efi Neve, and the former president of the Israeli district court, Eitan Orenstein. The recordings apparently show a problematic relationship between the two parties, which ultimately caused a criminal procedure against Nave.

== Criticism ==
Levinson entered inappropriate information in the Hebrew Wikipedia and posted tweets about it. He also spoke against Netanyahu government, causing political controversy.
