= Kalukundi mine =

Kalukundi Mine Mine de Kalukundi
- Location in the Congo
- Location: Lualaba Province, DR Congo; 10°37′23″S 25°53′59″E
- Products: Copper
- Company: Eurasian Resources Group (75%); Gécamines (25%)
- Website: www.kalukundimine.africa

Kalukundi Mine (French: Mine de Kalukundi) is a copper and cobalt mine being developed in Katanga Province, Democratic Republic of the Congo (DRC) by Africo Resources, a Canadian company. In September 2008 the company estimated the value of the resource as $1.47 billion.

== Ownership ==
The property is owned by Swanmines, which is jointly owned by Africo Resources (75%) and the state-owned Gécamines (25%).

=== Ownership dispute and Camrose buyout ===
In 2007 there was an ownership dispute when a DRC company named Akam Mining claimed it had bought control of Swanmines, and this claim was upheld in a superior court in Lubumbashi. In September 2007 from DRC justice minister Georges Minsay Booka directed Gécamines to take note that Akam Mining had no stake in the property. In 2008, Dan Gertler offered to buy a majority stake in Africo. At the same time, Gertler allegedly paid $900,000 in bribes to Congolese court officials to delay ruling on the case until Africo shareholders could vote on Gertler's buyout offer. Africo shareholders voted to accept the buyout offer, giving Gertler's Camrose Resources a 63% controlling stake in Africo.

Following a government review of all Katanga mining contracts, in February 2009 Africo Resources made an agreement with the DRC government and Gécamines for amended terms for the project.

=== Subsequent Och-Ziff lawsuits ===
According to prosecutors in the United States, Israeli mining magnate Dan Gertler paid millions of dollars in bribes through Och-Ziff Capital Management in order to influence legal proceedings in the DRC over the Kalukundi mine. In 2016, Och-Ziff agreed to pay a $412 million settlement as restitution for passing along bribes from Gertler. This case precipitated a similar bribery complaint, made public in 2019, from Africo investors against Och-Ziff. The restitution payment was eventually sent out in 2020.

=== ENRC buyout ===
In 2010, Eurasian Natural Resources Corporation bought a 50.5% majority of Camrose Resources, which held a majority stake in the Kalukundi mine. In 2012, ENRC finished acquiring the rest of Camorse.

ENRC reorganized as the privately held Eurasian Resources Group in 2013. ERG acquired the rest of Africo resources in 2016.

== Location ==
The Kalukundi project is in the Kolwezi District of Katanga Province, 32 kilometres (20 mi) west of the Tenke Fungurume Mine and 65 kilometres (40 mi) by road from Kolwezi. A major power line runs through the south of the Kalukundi area. The Kolwezi-Likasi railway runs 2 kilometres (1.2 mi) south of the property.

An initial feasibility study was conducted between May 2004 and May 2006. Drilling indicated a reserve of 7.8 million tonnes of ore grading 2.44% copper and 0.69% cobalt in oxides at a depth of 40 metres (130 ft) to 130 metres (430 ft). This was considered a conservative estimate of resources.

The Kalukundi mine is directly contiguous to the Kii, Mashitu, and Pangalume resources, which are held by La Congolaise de Mines et de Développement (Comide), a company also majority owned by the Eurasian Resources Group.

== Development plans ==
The plan used as the basis for the 2006 feasibility study was to produce 800,000 tonnes of ore per year, giving an estimated annual yield of 16,400 tonnes of copper and 3,800 tonnes of cobalt. Ore would be extracted by a contractor using conventional open pit selective exploitation, with multiple pits and multiple cut-back to ensure a steady supply of ore. A revised study was commissioned in June 2011 to investigate a 50% higher rate of ore production, and to take into account the much higher metal prices.

Eurasian Resources Group (ERG) - camrose resources subsidiaria Since 2016 ERG won the licitory about Kalukundi.
