= Billy Rautenbach =

Zimbabwean businessman (born 1959)

- Born: Muller Conrad Rautenbach; 23 September 1959 (age 66); Salisbury, Southern Rhodesia
- Occupation: Businessman
- Spouse: Jenny Lynn Rautenbach (née Noon)

Muller Conrad "Billy" Rautenbach (born in Salisbury, 23 September 1959) is a Zimbabwean businessman. His ventures span transportation, cobalt mining, platinum mining and biofuel production primarily across Africa. The 2022 data leaks from Credit Suisse appeared to confirm allegations (previously linked to American and European sanctions) that Muller used proceeds from a mining deal to support the ZANU-PF regime of dictator Robert Mugabe during the latter's repressive 2008 election campaign in Zimbabwe. From 1999 to 2009, Muller was a fugitive facing fraud and corruption charges in South Africa, the EU, and the U.S. for his role in the violent 2008 Zimbabwean election.

== Early life ==
Billy Rautenbach was born on the 23rd of September 1959 in Salisbury, Southern Rhodesia (also known as Harare, Zimbabwe since April, 18, 1980). He inherited a Rhodesia-based trucking company from his father, Wessels and his rise in the business world began when he moved to Johannesburg, South Africa.

== Career ==
=== Business ventures ===
Rautenbach's first venture was the expansion of his father's transport company, Wheels of Africa. The company became a significant player in southern Africa, with the Financial Mail estimating that it controlled 75% of the Zimbabwean haulage market in 1999. Wheels of Africa also expanded into car assembly and distribution; Rautenbach held a 50% stake in Hyundai's operations in South Africa and Botswana and owned the Volvo heavy vehicle franchise in thirteen African countries. He also had business interests in construction, land, and mining.

Rautenbach left South Africa in late 1999 because of fraud and corruption charges. This coincided with the financial collapse of several of his South African business interests. By February 2000, several companies in the Wheels of Africa Group had been liquidated, leaving significant debts in South Africa. Rautenbach did not return to South Africa until 2009, when he reached a R40 million (~$5 million US) plea agreement with prosecutors.

=== Mining activities ===
In the late 1990s, Rautenbach became involved in mining ventures in the Democratic Republic of the Congo (DRC). In 1998, following Mbaka Kawaya Swana Ambroise, DRC President Laurent-Désiré Kabila appointed him as the chief executive of the state-owned mining company, Gécamines. Before his appointment, Wheels of Africa had held transport contracts with Gécamines, and Rautenbach's company, Ridgepointe Overseas Development Limited, had successfully managed at least three of its copper and cobalt mines, increasing their revenue. He was removed as Gécamines chief executive – apparently acrimoniously – in 2000, and his Congolese assets were seized.

Rautenbach controlled Boss Mining Ltd, which held the rights to half of the Mukondo mine and two other mining concessions in the Katanga province of the DRC. In February 2006, he became a major shareholder in the Central African Mining and Exploration Company (CAMEC), receiving a 17% share when it acquired those mining rights. He owned 8% of CAMEC shares as of July 2007, and reportedly made an estimated $50 million from the 2009 sale of CAMEC to the Eurasian Natural Resources Corporation. Yet by 2007, Rautenbach was again an unpopular figure among some DRC politicians. CAMEC had been building a stake in Katanga Mining, but faced government opposition, at least partly due to the involvement of Rautenbach, who was wanted by the South African authorities for fraud at the time. In July 2007, Rautenbach was detained in Katanga and deported to Zimbabwe. Moise Katumbi, governor of Katanga, said, "[e]ven if we have as yet no extradition facilities in place, we will not continue to allow such people to operate in the DRC with impunity."

== Controversies ==
=== Fraud and corruption charges in South Africa ===
In November 1999, after investigating Rautenbach for about two years, South African law enforcement conducted a raid on Rautenbach's Johannesburg home and private aircraft, as well as the Johannesburg offices of Wheels of Africa. Following the raid and amid financial strain in his South African business interests, Rautenbach fled South Africa. On 19 September 2000, Rautenbach's South African assets, worth at least R40 million, were seized by the National Prosecuting Authority (NPA). He faced charges for crimes he had allegedly committed while at Hyundai, including numerous counts of fraud and theft. In March 2007, South African authorities filed for his extradition from Zimbabwe. On 18 September 2009, Rautenbach handed himself over to the NPA. Charged with 326 counts of fraud, he pleaded guilty on behalf of one of his companies, SA Botswana Hauliers, and, in a plea bargain, agreed to pay a fine of R40 million in exchange for the withdrawal of the charges against him, having continued to deny personal liability.

==== Death of Yong Koo Kwon ====
Rautenbach launched a legal challenge against the validity of the 1999 raids and the evidence seized in the process, with the Constitutional Court ultimately ruling against him. In court papers, the state claimed that Rautenbach was linked to the murder of Yong Koo Kwon of Daewoo Motors, who had been shot dead in his car in Johannesburg in February 1999. Rautenbach emphatically denied any involvement in the murder and described the allegations as a "witch-hunt." No charges were ever laid against Rautenbach, while three other men were charged with the murder in 2006.

==== Corruption trial of Jackie Selebi ====
Two months after striking the 2009 plea bargain with the NPA, Rautenbach testified for the prosecution in the corruption trial of Jackie Selebi, National Commissioner of the South African Police Service. Selebi was accused of accepting bribes from Rautenbach and two other businessmen. During the trial, convicted drug smuggler Glen Agliotti testified that Selebi had been asked to intervene in NPA and South African Revenue Service (SARS) investigations into Rautenbach, to cancel Rautenbach's arrest warrant, and to provide information about whether Rautenbach was wanted by Interpol, of which Selebi was president. Agliotti said, and Rautenbach confirmed, that Rautenbach paid $100,000 to Agliotti, who channelled $30,000 to Selebi.

=== Alleged ties to ZANU-PF in Zimbabwe ===
Critics alleged that Rautenbach had been appointed to Gécamines, the Congolese state-owned mining company, at the request of the Zimbabwean ruling party, ZANU-PF. Indeed, in 1999, The Guardian revealed that the existence of such an arrangement had been "a widespread assumption in diplomatic circles." The allegation, as made by the United Nations panel in 2001, was that Rautenbach had been appointed to Gécamines to assist with channeling mining profits from the DRC to the ZANU-PF regime, in exchange for Zimbabwean military support for Kabila's forces in the Second Congo War. He was reportedly an associate of Emmerson Mnangagwa, the ZANU-PF government's Minister of Justice, Legal and Parliamentary Affairs, who was sworn in as Zimbabwe's President on 24 November 2017, after then-Zimbabwean president Robert Mugabe was removed in a coup d'état. In 1999, Rautenbach denied the allegations, saying that he had never met Robert Mugabe.

In 2008, CAMEC was involved in a controversial deal, in which, through the purchase of another company, it provided a $100 million payment, referred to as a loan, in exchange for the acquisition of Zimbabwean platinum assets, previously owned by Anglo American Platinum, which the Zimbabwean government had taken control of. The payment was financed with capital raised primarily from the American hedge fund Och-Ziff, and was reportedly used by ZANU-PF to fund its repressive 2008 election campaign. Shortly afterwards, in October 2008, the American embassy in Zimbabwe investigated Rautenbach for his involvement in off-the-book sales of vehicles to the Zimbabwean government.

In November 2008, the United States Treasury Department designated Rautenbach and a company he controlled, Ridgepointe Overseas Development Ltd., for sanctions, calling him one of the Mugabe regime's "cronies" and claiming that he had provided Mugabe with support which had enabled the latter to pursue anti-democratic policies. The sanctions remained in place until April 2014. Rautenbach was also subject to targeted European Union sanctions from January 2009 until February 2012, for his alleged association with the ZANU-PF regime.

==== Suisse Secrets ====
The 2022 Data Leaks at Credit Suisse appeared to confirm earlier allegations that Rautenbach had supported the Mugabe regime's campaign during the 2008 Zimbabwean elections. Credit Suisse opened two accounts for Rautenbach just weeks before a mining deal that funneled $100 million to Mugabe's government, reportedly used to finance violence that helped secure Mugabe's victory. Rautenbach later sold his shares from the deal for a substantial profit, although the mine remained abandoned and undeveloped for more than a decade.

==== Alleged corruption ====
In 2014, Temba Mliswa, the provincial chairperson for Zanu-PF in Mashonaland West and a Member of the Zimbabwean Parliament, accused Rautenbach of bribing Arda board chairperson Basil Nyabadza, claiming that he had bought Nyabadza a house in exchange for preferential treatment. Nyabadza denied the allegations, and Rautenbach called Mliswa, who at the time was demanding millions of dollars he claimed Rautenbach owed him for investment consulting services, an "extortionist." In 2019, Mliswa made various further accusations about Rautenbach's ventures in Zimbabwe and connections to the Zimbabwean government.

==== Land and other disputes ====
According to amaBhungane, local activists claim that Green Fuel has encroached on communal land in Chipinge, displacing thousands of families, without sufficient compensation. They also claim that the firm has polluted the water, bulldozed maize fields to build a road, and failed to honour its promises to pay sugarcane growers $4 a tonne. Chipinge residents, supported by the non-profit Zimbabwe Lawyers for Human Rights, are challenging Green Fuel's claim to the land in the courts. A 2015 report by the Zimbabwean Parliament's Portfolio Committee on Youth, Indigenisation and Economic Empowerment echoed many of these accusations and concluded that the project violated the country's indigenisation laws. It also learned from the Environmental Management Agency that Green Fuel had not conducted a full environmental impact assessment study, as required by law, before initiating the project.

Green Fuel has denied the accusations, stating that, through its corporate social responsibility programme, Vimbo, it has spent millions of dollars on developing the neighbouring villages and providing irrigation, electricity, and stock feed to villagers. It has committed to developing irrigation schemes, dedicating 10% of all land to sugar cane, and, in 2021, it unveiled one such scheme, among the highest in the country, in Chisumbanje, under which it provided drip irrigation equipment and plots to villagers. The company has also denied claims that the plant's effluent is a pollutant. Cde Basil Nyabadza of the Arda board said in 2015 that the project was justified on the grounds that it would reduce Zimbabwe's import bill. Indeed, according to Bloomberg, the project reduces Zimbabwe's spending on fuel imports by about one-tenth, or $40 million, per year. Voice of America reported in 2011 that it had created 4,500 jobs, "more jobs... than any other [project] in the last 20 years." By 2021, it employed about 3,000 people.

In July 2021, several Zimbabwean newspapers reported that Green Fuel security guards had razed crops and destroyed houses in Chinyamukwakwa, Chipinge, affecting thousands of villagers, in order to facilitate Green Fuel's expansion in the area. According to the headman of the village, thousands of displaced residents of Chipinge were resettling in neighbouring Mozambique. Rautenbach and Green Fuel have also been involved in disputes with the Nuanetsi Ranch board over land on Nuanetsi Ranch on the Mwenezi River, to which Rautenbach first gained access in 2009.

=== Pandora Papers ===
As reported by amaBhungane in the Daily Maverick, Rautenbach was named in the 2021 Pandora Papers leak. The leak provided evidence of a complex offshore family trust fund, begun in 2013 when Rautenbach, while still under American sanctions, donated multimillion-dollar investments in his coal and ethanol businesses to his wife.The fund is held in Rautenbach's wife's name, but in leaked documents, financial advisors identified Rautenbach as the "effective controller" of the fund.

== Personal life ==
In his youth, Rautenbach pursued rally racing. His son, Conrad Rautenbach, is a rally driver, competing in the World Rally Championship full-time in 2008 and 2009.
