= Mbaka Kawaya Swana Ambroise =

Ambroise Mbaka Kawaya Swana
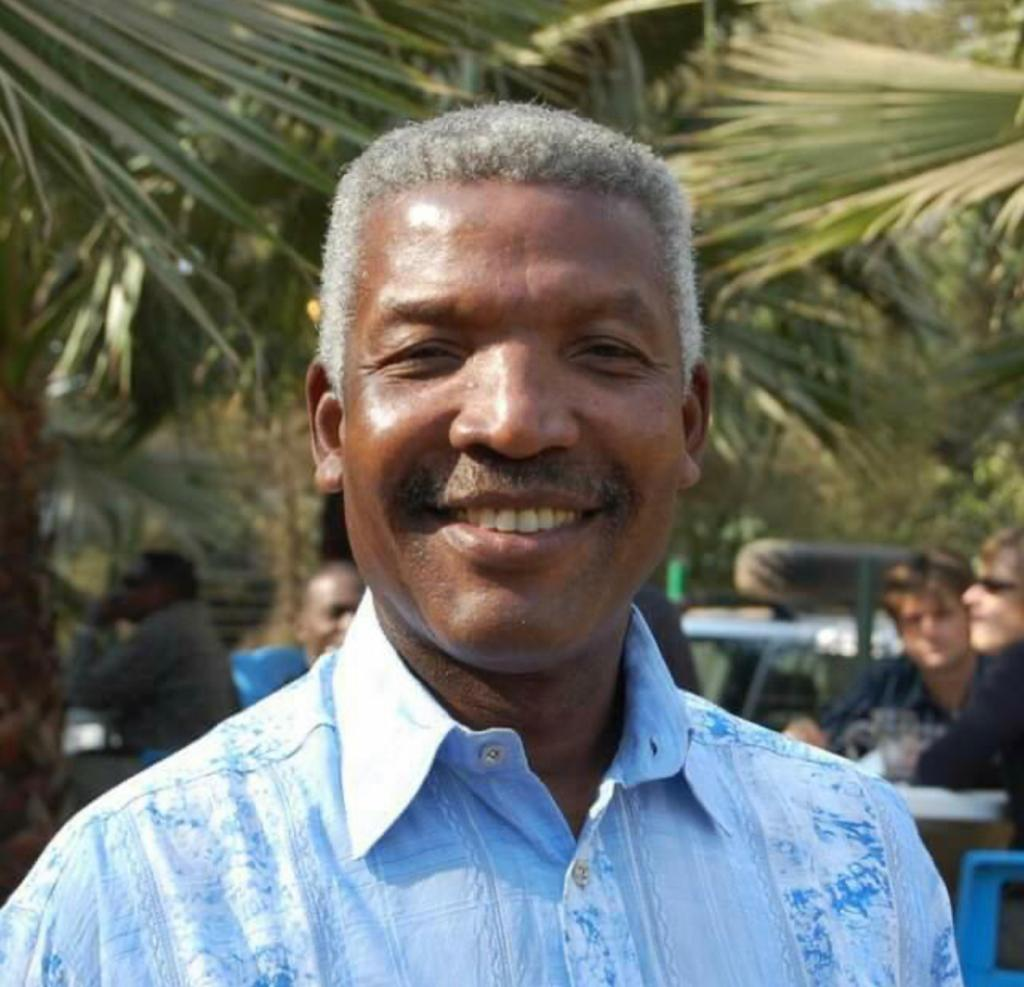
- Born: May 19, 1949; Dilolo, Katanga Province, Democratic Republic of the Congo
- Died: July 10, 2015 (aged 66); Johannesburg, South Africa
- Education: Institut Mutoshi; University of Lubumbashi
- Occupations: Engineer, mining executive, government official
- Known for: Contributions to the Congolese mining sector
- Children: 10

Ambroise Mbaka Kawaya Swana (19 May 1949 – 10 July 2015) was a Congolese engineer and mining executive known for his pioneering work in the metallurgical industry of the Democratic Republic of Congo. He held various influential positions at Gécamines and in the Congolese Government, significantly contributing to the development and advancement of the country's mining sector.

== Early life and education ==
Ambroise Mbaka Kawaya Swana was born on 19 May 1949 in Dilolo, Katanga Province, in what is now the Lualaba Province of the Democratic Republic of Congo. Growing up in a region rich in mineral resources, he developed an early interest in mining and metallurgy.

=== Secondary Education ===
He completed his secondary education with a Technician A2 degree in electricity and electronics from the Institut Mutoshi in 1968. This technical background laid a strong foundation for his future studies and career in metallurgy.

=== University of Lubumbashi ===
Ambroise furthered his education at the University of Lubumbashi, one of the leading institutions in the country. In 1973, he graduated as a civil metallurgical engineer, part of the second promotion of the university. His academic excellence and technical expertise set him apart as one of the promising young engineers of his generation.

=== Specialisation Abroad ===
In pursuit of advanced knowledge and specialised training, Ambroise Mbaka Kawaya Swana went abroad to further his studies in hydrometallurgy and copper refining. He specialised in the following areas:

- Hydrometallurgy of Non-Ferrous Metals: This included specialisation in the extraction and refining of metals such as copper, cobalt, zinc, and nickel, as well as precious metals like gold and platinum.
- Electrolytic Copper Refining: He gained expertise in the electrolytic refining of copper, which is essential for producing high-purity copper cathodes.

==== Study and Training in Belgium ====
One of the key highlights of his educational journey was his training at the OLEN plant of Metallurgie Hoboken-Overpelt in Belgium. During his time there, he:

- Specialised in electrolytic copper refining.
- Conducted studies on the refinement of Congolese blister copper at the OLEN plant.
- Developed operational conditions for refining Congolese copper, which later contributed to local copper refining initiatives in Lubumbashi.

This international exposure not only enhanced his technical skills but also provided him with a broader perspective on metallurgical practices and innovations.

== Professional career ==
=== Gécamines (1973–1998) ===
==== Early Years and Achievements (1973–1974) ====
Ambroise Mbaka began his career at Gécamines in 1973 as the Ingénieur Chef de Service at the Shituru plants in Likasi. He was the first Zairian civil metallurgical engineer at Gécamines, marking a significant milestone for local expertise in leadership. During his tenure:

- Gécamines aimed to increase copper production from 475,000 tonnes to 600,000 tonnes per year.
- The General Delegation, led by Umba Kiamitala, decided that Zairian engineers should lead this expansion.

==== Director of Hydrometallurgical Copper Circuit (1977–1986) ====
From 1977 to 1986, Mbaka Kawaya served as director of the hydrometallurgical copper circuit at the Luilu plants in Kolwezi. His notable contributions included:

- Starting up the copper and cobalt hydrometallurgical plants in Luilu in 1978.
- Initiating the operation of the first electrolytic copper refinery at Luilu.
- Improving the quality of Gécamines' copper cathodes to 99.99% purity.
- Conducting studies on refining Congolese blister copper at the OLEN plant in Belgium.

==== Deputy Director of Hydrometallurgical and Thermal Plants (1986) ====
In 1986, upon his return from OLEN, he was promoted to deputy director of the hydrometallurgical and thermal plants at Shituru in Likasi. He managed 3,500 employees and oversaw the production of 135,000 tonnes of copper cathodes, 7,000 tonnes of cobalt cathodes, and 200,000 tonnes of refined copper annually.

==== Director of Hydrometallurgical Plants (1987–1990) ====
From 1987 to 1990, Mbaka Kawaya was the director of the hydrometallurgical plants in Luilu, managing 1,500 employees. He was instrumental in achieving an annual production of 175,000 tonnes of copper cathodes and 9,000 tonnes of cobalt cathodes, and starting the first electrolytic copper refinery in the country.

==== 1990: Deputy Director of the West Group in Kolwezi ====
In 1990, Mbaka Kawaya became deputy director of the West Group in Kolwezi, part of Gécamines, responsible for metallurgical operations across various locations, including the Kamoto underground mine, Kolwezi's open-pit mines, and the concentrators at Kolwezi and Kamoto.

==== Director of Planning, Research, and Development (1992–1997) ====
From 1992 to 1997, Mbaka Kawaya served as Director of Planning, Research, and Development at Gécamines. In this strategic role, he introduced joint ventures with projects such as Tenke Fungurume, Rejets de Kolwezi, and Gisements de Ruashi Etoile. These initiatives aimed to refinance Gécamines and contribute to the economic development of the region.

==== President Délégué Général (1997–1998) ====
In 1997, Mbaka Kawaya assumed the role of President Délégué Général of Gécamines. During this period, he introduced a strategic cobalt exploitation plan, focusing on small cobalt deposits such as KASOMBO, KABABANKOLA, and TWILEZEMBE. The plan involved direct leaching of cobalt-bearing ores to improve cobalt recovery rates.

=== Société Minière de Bakwanga (2000) ===
In 2000, Mbaka Kawaya joined Societé Minière de Bakwanga as technical director. He significantly increased diamond production by reorganising the treatment of rejects and implementing anti-theft measures.

=== Ministry of Mines (2000–2002) ===
From 2000 to 2002, Mbaka Kawaya served as the vice-minister of mines under presidents Laurent Désiré Kabila and Joseph Kabila. He contributed to the formulation of the Mining Code and Regulations, and defended the Mining Code in parliament before its presidential promulgation.

=== Cadastre Minier (2003–2004) ===
From 2003 to 2004, Mbaka Kawaya served as the first director general of Cadastre Minier (CAMI) in the Democratic Republic of Congo, initiating the establishment of the country's first Mining Cadastre.

== Later career and contributions ==
Mbaka Kawaya was involved in various roles, including:

- Mining agent and consultant in geology, mining, metallurgy, and mineral processing.
- Owner and shareholder of mining permits for copper, cobalt, and gold.
- Proprietor of a sawmill, carpentry workshop, mechanical fabrication shop, and a hydrometallurgical copper production plant.
- Member of the Economic and Social Council

== Specialisations and achievements ==
Ambroise Mbaka Kawaya participated in various management training and seminars. He was pivotal in producing the first copper cathode in the Bas-Congo.

== Personal life ==
Ambroise Mbaka Kawaya Swana was married and had ten children. He died on 10 July 2015 in Johannesburg, South Africa. His legacy in the Congolese mining industry remains impactful, with significant contributions to the country's metallurgical advancements.
