= Africo Resources =

Canadian mining company

- Traded as: TSX: ARL (until 2016)
- Industry: Mining
- Fate: Acquired by Camrose Resources Limited
- Headquarters: Democratic Republic of the Congo, Vancouver, Canada
- Key people: Chris Theodoropoulos, Chairman
- Website: www.africoresources.com

Africo Resources was a Canadian mining company whose main property is the copper and cobalt Kalukundi Mine in Katanga Province, Democratic Republic of the Congo. A majority of the company was acquired by Camrose Resources Limited in 2016. The company was founded in 2006 as a spin-off from Rubicon Minerals and was listed on the Toronto Stock Exchange.

== Company profile ==
Africo was founded in 2006 as a spin-off from Rubicon Minerals, and was listed on the Toronto Stock Exchange. Apart from the main Kalukundi project, the company has an agreement to purchase the highly speculative Mashitu adjoining property. It also has rights to three large-scale licenses to explore for gold, nickel and copper in Zambia's Mporokoso sedimentary basin.

In April 2007, Africo Resources raised C$130-million to fund development of the Kalukundi property. In November 2007 the International Finance Corporation agreed to provide a loan of about $40-million, subject to risk assessment. As of September 2008 the company had a market capitalization of C$120 million. In February 2009 Africo reached an agreement with the DRC government on amendments to the Kalakundi mining contract. It agreed to pay Gecamines an additional $1.6 million annually for four years on top of the existing 2.5% royalty on gross sales payable to Gecamines. Shares prices shot up after the announcement. In November 2011 market capitalization had sunk to C$54.2 million.

== Kalukundi ownership dispute ==
The Kalukundi property is owned by Swanmines, which is jointly owned by Africo Resources (75%) and the state-owned Kalumines (25%). In 2007 there was an ownership dispute when a DRC company named Akam Mining claimed it had bought control of Swanmines, and this claim was upheld in a superior court in Lubumbashi. In September 2007 Africo said "third parties" were trying to steal its Kalukundi asset through the "systematic misuse of the judicial system". Later that month the DRC justice minister Georges Minsay Booka directed Gécamines to take note that Akam Mining had no stake in the property. In October Africo said it had received a letter from Moïse Katumbi Chapwe, the Governor of Katanga, confirming that Akam did not own shares in the subsidiary company.

== Resource estimates ==
A 2006 feasibility study estimated the Kalukundi Mine could produce 800,000 tonnes of ore per year, giving an estimated annual yield of 16,400 tonnes of copper and 3,800 tonnes of cobalt. Ore would be extracted by a contractor using conventional open pit selective exploitation, with multiple pits and multiple cut-back to ensure a steady supply of ore. A revised study was commissioned in June 2011 to investigate a 50% higher rate of ore production, and to take into account the much higher metal prices.

== Social involvement ==
In October 2007, Africo's Swanmines subsidiary signed a Memorandum of Understanding with the DRC Ministry for Social Affairs. The company pledged to align social development programs the local areas of need the Ministry identified. This was the first agreement of this kind to be signed by any mining company in Katanga province. In December 2008 Africo was given an award for its outstanding and innovative community service in the Katanga Copperbelt, including Africo's Wheelchairs for Kids program.
