= Solvent extraction and electrowinning =

Two-stage hydrometallurgical process

Solvent extraction and electrowinning (SX/EW) is a two-stage hydrometallurgical process that first extracts and upgrades copper ions from low-grade leach solutions into a solvent containing a chemical that selectively reacts with and binds the copper in the solvent. The copper is extracted from the solvent with strong aqueous acid which then deposits pure copper onto cathodes using an electrolytic procedure (electrowinning).

SX/EW processing is best known for its use by the copper industry, where it accounts for 20% of worldwide production, but the technology is also successfully applied to a wide range of other metals including cobalt, nickel, zinc and uranium.
