= John Bredenkamp =

Zimbabwean businessman and rugby union footballer (1940–2020)

- Born: John Arnold Bredenkamp; 11 August 1940; Kimberley, South Africa
- Died: 18 June 2020 (aged 79); Harare, Zimbabwe
- Education: Prince Edward School
- Known for: founder, Casalee Group

John Arnold Bredenkamp (11 August 1940 – 18 June 2020) was a Zimbabwean businessman and rugby union footballer. He was the founder of the Casalee Group.

== Early life ==
Born in South Africa, Bredenkamp moved with his family to Southern Rhodesia while he was still a child. He was orphaned in his mid-teens on his birthday when while he was riding his bike, on return he found his father had shot his mother and sister and then shot himself. His sister survived the shooting. He was educated in Southern Rhodesia at Prince Edward School, Salisbury. Of Dutch ancestry, Bredenkamp registered as a Rhodesian citizen in 1958. He was reported to have lost Zimbabwean citizenship "by default" in 1984, but this was restored to him shortly thereafter.

Bredenkamp was reported to hold Zimbabwean, South African and Dutch passports. The matter of his nationality was a matter of dispute with some Zimbabwean officials towards the end of 2006.

As a Rugby Union international, he captained Rhodesia from 1965 to 1968.

== Early career ==
After his graduation, Bredenkamp joined Gallaher Limited, an international tobacco company in Zimbabwe (then Rhodesia), as a leaf buyer. In 1968 he was transferred to Niemeyer in the Netherlands, where he rose to the position of leaf director.

After leaving Gallaher in 1976, Bredenkamp founded the Casalee Group of companies registered in Antwerp, Belgium. It is believed that the Casalee operation was involved in the sale of Rhodesian tobacco on world markets, through evasion of UN sanctions. Casalee was primarily a leaf tobacco merchanting company but was also engaged in general trading and an active initiator of counter trade and barter deals. The Casalee Group grew over 16 years to become the fifth largest tobacco merchant in the world and the biggest non-US leaf tobacco company. The Group employed 2,500 people and had offices in all the major tobacco growing countries in the world including the USA (Winston-Salem), Argentina, Brazil, Bulgaria, China, Greece, India, Indonesia, Italy, Portugal, Russia, Spain, Thailand, Turkey and Yugoslavia. The company owned tobacco-processing factories in the Netherlands, Zimbabwe, Malawi and Brazil.

The Casalee Group of companies was sold in 1993 to Universal Leaf Tobacco, the largest leaf tobacco company in the world. Since then, Bredenkamp has expanded his business interests into many other different areas, mainly through the Zimbabwe registered Breco company.

== Role in Zimbabwe ==
Bredenkamp's career took off in earnest during the late 1970s when he became deeply involved in the commercial affairs of the embargoed UDI regime in Rhodesia. It has been claimed that he effectively ran the finances of the Rhodesian Security Forces during the later stages of the Bush War. In this capacity, he brokered export sales of Rhodesian products (mainly tobacco) and used the proceeds to fund the purchase of munitions and military equipment. His "sanctions busting" deals (often involving complex barter transactions) sustained the UDI regime for far longer than would otherwise have been possible. These deals were entirely legal under Rhodesian law.

After independence in 1980, Bredenkamp left Zimbabwe and moved his base of operations to Belgium. However, he remained involved in commodity trading and defence procurement. He made himself useful in certain quarters. In 1984 he made his peace with the rulers of the new Zimbabwe and was able to return home. Zimbabwe provided a hospitable base for Bredenkamp's dealings with customers in Africa and the Middle East. These dealings made Bredenkamp and his associates very wealthy men. They also helped sustain the Zimbabwean economy in a time of some turbulence.

Bredenkamp gained considerable clout in the political and economic affairs of Zimbabwe. It is known that he played a significant role in the events surrounding Zimbabwe's intervention in the DRC between 1998 and 2003. This intervention involved using the Zimbabwean army and air force to support the Kabila government in its war with rebels backed by Uganda and Rwanda. There appears to have been some linkage between the intervention and generous mining concessions granted by the DRC to figures in the Zimbabwe political and business elite. When Zimbabwe was subject to EU sanctions from 1999 onwards, the Mugabe regime was able to call on sanctions busting expertise from the UDI era to keep its armed forces supplied.

Bredenkamp became something of a power behind the scenes in the ruling ZANU-PF party. It is claimed that he sought to facilitate the early retirement of President Mugabe in 2004 and his replacement by Emmerson Mnangagwa, former Security Minister and Speaker of Parliament. This displeased rival factions in ZANU-PF, and government investigations were started into the affairs of Bredenkamp's Breco trading company concerning tax evasion and exchange control violations. The matters under investigation were transactions between Breco in Zimbabwe and offshore companies controlled by Bredenkamp.

Bredenkamp was linked to claims to facilitate the retirement of Mugabe in 2000, by the Guardian's investigation into the leaked US embassy cables.

In September 2006 Bredenkamp was tried in Zimbabwe on charges that he used a South African passport on international journeys. Zimbabwean citizenship law does not permit dual nationality. Although acquitted, he had to fight a second court case to obtain an order to return his Zimbabwe passport which the clerk of the court had retained. He was ordered to produce documentary evidence of his renunciation of South African citizenship to have his nationality restored permanently. But his passport was returned.

In April 2016, The Guardian reported that Bredenkamp had an "estimated £700m fortune from tobacco trading, grey-market arms dealing, sports marketing and diamond mining."

From 2008 until his death, Bredenkamp was the subject of US sanctions aimed at people of significant influence within the Zimbabwean government.

== Death ==
According to news reports, Bredenkamp died on 18 June 2020 due to kidney failure.

== See also ==
- Tremalt
- Whites in Zimbabwe
