= Mining industry of the Democratic Republic of the Congo =

Mining industry in the Democratic Republic of the Congo

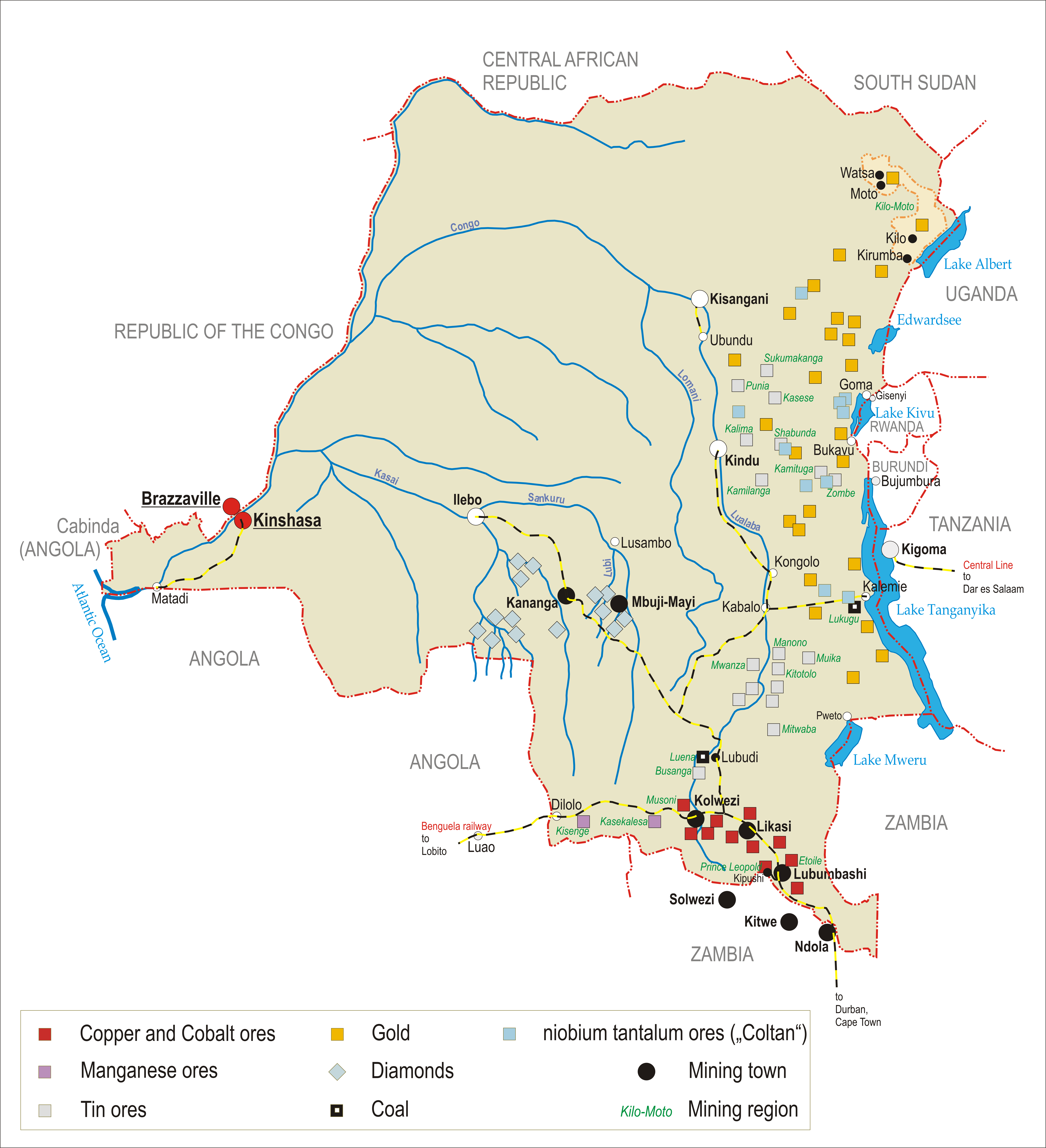
Map of mining in the DRC

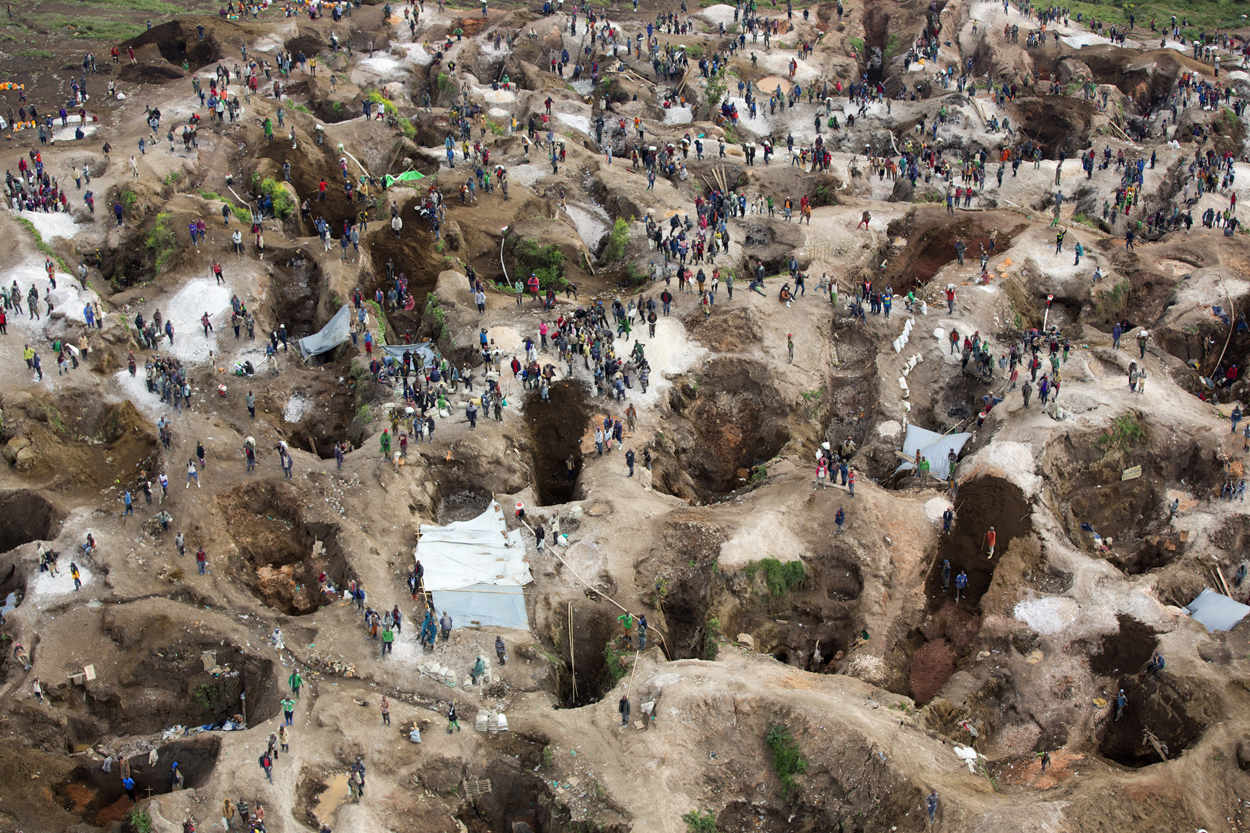
Rubaya coltan mines

The mining industry of the Democratic Republic of the Congo (French: Industrie minière de la République Démocratique du Congo) is a major global supplier of minerals including cobalt, copper, diamonds, gold, tantalum, and tin. The DRC supplies over 60% of global cobalt, and mineral exports account for more than 95% of the country's export revenues. According to a 2011 report, the total value of the major mineral reserves in the DRC amounts to a total of over 300 billion US dollars.

Mining includes large-scale industrial projects, semi-industrial ventures, and widespread artisanal and small-scale mining (ASM), often under dangerous and exploitative conditions.

== Mining types ==
=== Industrial mining ===
Industrial mining is the mechanized extraction of minerals using heavy machinery, proper mining sites, and formal legalized operations. In the DRC, these mines are typically run by large corporations or foreign firms, which allows them to process massive volumes of ore and meet the demand for cobalt used in electric vehicles and electronics worldwide. This mining type includes modern safety standards, designated work zones, and regulated labor laws as compared to artisanal mines. Large scale exploration permits (permis de recherches, PR) and exploitation permits (permis d'exploitation, PE) are officially granted by the DRC Mining Register (cadastre minier, CAMI). Such ventures typically require years of planning, and involve millions of dollars of investment. The largest financiers are the Congolese firm Rawbank, which as of 2022 had leant out $820 million to mining companies, and the Kenyan firm Equity Group Holdings.

=== Artisanal and semi-industrial mining ===
Artisanal mining is a form of mineral extraction carried out by individuals or small groups using basic tools such as hands, rocks, or pick axes in rare cases. Miners are digging for cobalt, copper, or other minerals in shallow pits, dangerous narrow tunnels, and informal open sites. This form of mining is usually driven by a lack of other employment opportunities, which makes it the main source of income for many families. Artisanal mining operates outside of formal systems and lacks the protections found in regulated industrial mines, making workers vulnerable to exploitation and abuse.

The danger of artisanal mining comes primarily from the unsafe and unregulated conditions of the mines themselves. Miners often work in hand dug shafts that are poorly reinforced or not reinforced at all, introducing risks like tunnel collapses, suffocation, and serious injury. Since the work is informal, miners usually do not have helmets, masks, ventilation systems, or other personal protective equipment. People living near artisanal cobalt mining sites in Kolwezi had significantly higher levels of cobalt in their blood and urine, with children showing highly toxic exposure and evidence of DNA damage. This form of mining can create accidents underground as well as spread toxic dust and contaminated soil into surrounding areas, creating health threats for those nearby.

Artisanal mining is considered illegal since many sites operate outside of state regulation or formal labor laws. In the DRC miners often work on land that is owned by companies or in areas with a lack of official mining permits. This makes it hard to enforce labor protections or environmental protection policies, leading to the abuse of workers. Many people in the Congo depend on mining as their only form of income creating a cycle where these illegal, artisanal mines still run at the expense of these people's lives.

== Major commodities ==
=== Copper and cobalt ===
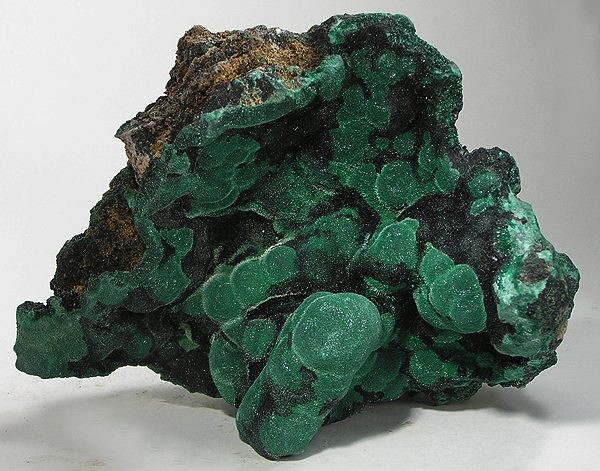
A sample from the Kolwezi area with green colored malachite containing copper and darker heterogenite containing cobalt.

The Democratic Republic of the Congo is the world's leading cobalt producer. In 2024, the country was estimated to account for between 67% and 76% of global cobalt production, according to figures published by the International Energy Agency (IEA), the United States Geological Survey (USGS), and the Cobalt Institute. Indonesia ranked as the second-largest producer, accounting for approximately 10–12% of global output and recording significant growth since 2021. Other producing countries, including Russia and China, represented around 3% each, while Canada, Australia, and Cuba accounted for smaller shares ranging between 1% and 2%. New Caledonia also contributed modestly to world production, exceeding 1% in 2023 before declining to 0.5% in 2024. In addition to its production dominance, the DRC has approximately 55% of global cobalt reserves, with around 6,000 kt of exploitable reserves out of an estimated worldwide total of 11,000 kt. Based on current extraction levels, reserve-to-production ratios suggest about 27 years of remaining reserves in the DRC compared to 38 years globally, assuming stable production.

Mining activity is concentrated mainly in the Copperbelt region. Cobalt, vital for electric vehicle batteries, is sourced from industrial and artisanal mines. Copper and cobalt resources are mined in the south of the country in the Copperbelt, in the Lualaba and Haut-Katanga provinces. Compared with the conflict-prone eastern regions where 3TG minerals are extracted, the south of the country is more politically stable, and mining operations there are generally associated with fewer concerns about conflict minerals than the 3TG mineral trade in the east. Industrial copper-cobalt production is largely managed through partnerships between foreign mining firms and the state-owned Gécamines as a minority stakeholder. In 2019, Glencore announced the temporary closure of the Mutanda Mine, the world's largest cobalt mine, citing declining commodity prices and increased government royalty taxes during the years of President Joseph Kabila's influence. Although industrial mining dominates production, artisanal extraction by hand remains widespread. To strengthen state oversight, the Congolese government established the Enterprise Generale du Cobalt (EGC) in December 2019 to centralize the purchase and marketing of cobalt produced by small-scale miners. However, by May 2022, the company had not yet begun operations, and discussions emerged regarding the cancellation of its monopoly. Concerns over unethical mining practices also attracted international attention, as companies such as Tesla, Google, and Apple faced a lawsuit related to allegations of unsafe artisanal cobalt mining and child labor in supply chains, although the case was later dismissed.

=== Diamonds ===
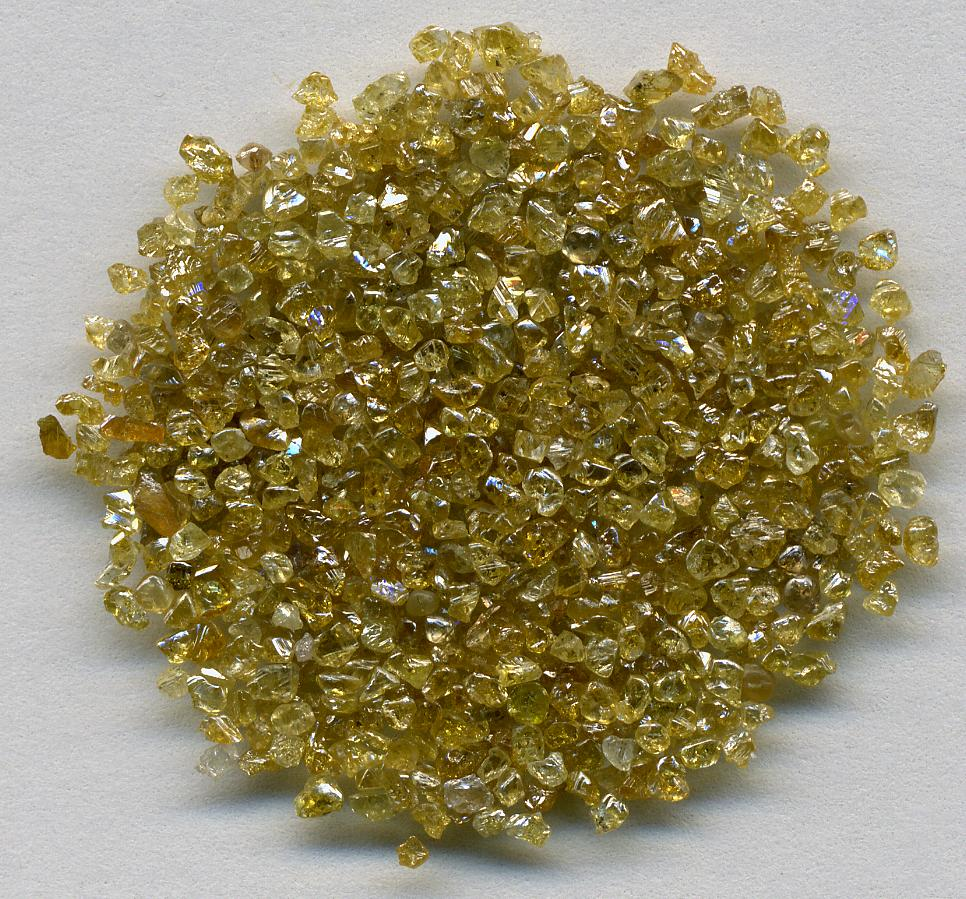
Rough diamonds from the Democratic Republic of the Congo. Their yellow color is due to the presence of impurities which absorb blue light.

The DRC is home to around 9% of global diamond reserves and remains an important producer of industrial and gem-quality diamonds, accounting for 18% of industrial diamonds and 3% of gem-quality diamonds.

Annual production has declined considerably, dropping from nearly 30 million carats at the beginning of the century to an average of 11.7 million carats annually since 2019. The first major decline happened around 2008 and was primarily linked to the deterioration of large-scale mining operations after the difficulties experienced by the state-owned mining company Société Minière de Bakwanga (MIBA). A second decline emerged around 2017 due to reduced artisanal mining production. Industrial diamond extraction is concentrated in the Kasaï region, where mining activities over the last decade have largely been dominated by Société Anhui-Congo d'Investissement Minier (SACIM) after MIBA's collapse. In 1990, one of the largest colorless diamonds in the world, the Millennium Star, was found in the Mbuji-Mayi area. MIBA also served as a major source of economic activity in Kasaï and played a key role in financing the military campaigns of former president Laurent-Désiré Kabila. Its downfall was accelerated by the loss of valuable concessions, exploitative (or 'leonine') agreements with foreign investors, insufficient investment, resource depletion, and unsuccessful renegotiation efforts, while allegations of corruption and diamond embezzlement also worsened the situation. As a result, MIBA's production fell dramatically from 9.5 million carats in 1990 to only tens of thousands of carats in recent years. Although President Félix Tshisekedi proposed a recovery strategy, skepticism remains because of inadequate funding. In 2013, the assets and debt of the state controlled Société Congolaise d'Investissement Minier (SCIM) were given to a new 50/50 joint venture between the Congolese government and the Anhui Foreign Economic Construction Group, Société Anhui-Congo d'Investissement Minier (SACIM). According to the deal, Anhui promised to spend $100 million on various infrastructure projects.

Since 2016, SACIM has become the country's leading diamond producer, exporting more than 4 million carats in 2022. Nevertheless, the company has faced numerous accusations concerning labor and human rights abuses, tax evasion, environmental pollution, resource exploitation, and limited contributions to local communities. In response to allegations of fraud, the government introduced a decree in 2022 requiring SACIM to market its diamonds through five approved Congolese exporters, a measure that was criticized by some parliamentarians as inconsistent with the Mining Code. SACIM reacted by reducing production levels. Alongside SACIM and the weakened remnants of MIBA, many semi-industrial mining companies continue to operate in the DRC, often with little government oversight. Several reportedly function under the protection of influential political actors or members of the FARDC, which limits external monitoring, and this lack of regulation has generated complaints regarding environmental degradation, reduced fish populations, water shortages, and the displacement of artisanal miners from mining zones. Since MIBA's collapse, artisanal miners have become the dominant producers of diamonds in the country. An estimated 450,000 artisanal miners are responsible for between 60% and 80% of diamond exports.

=== Gold ===
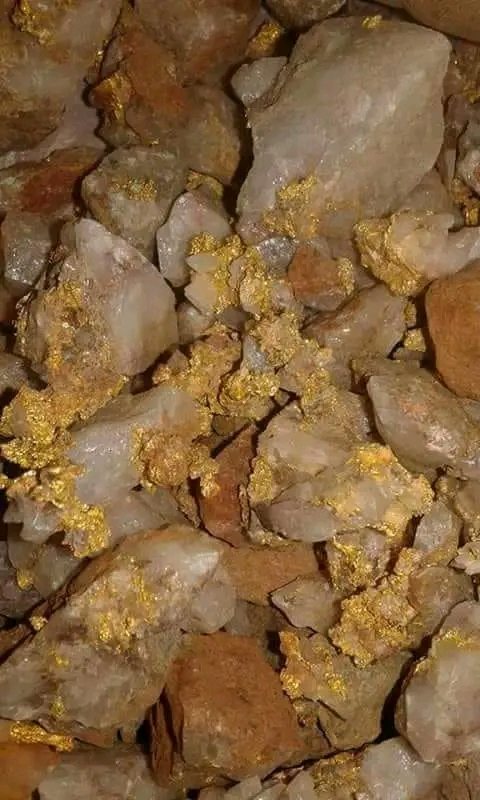
Gold deposits beneath the Congolese subsoil

The eastern Democratic Republic of the Congo contains major gold-rich geological zones, particularly the Twangiza-Namoya gold belt and the Kilo-Moto greenstone belt. These regions host both large-scale industrial mines, such as the Kibali Gold Mine, and several artisanal mining sites. In 2023, the country ranked as the world's 17th-largest gold producer, according to GlobalData, with output increasing slightly by 0.5% compared to 2022. Over the five years ending in 2022, however, gold production declined at a compound annual growth rate (CAGR) of 4.26%, while forecasts suggest a modest recovery, with expected growth of 0.88% annually between 2023 and 2027. The country currently contributes around 2% of global gold production, while the leading global producers include China, Russia, Australia, and Canada. Within the DRC, major gold producers include AngloGold Ashanti and Barrick Gold. Between 2020 and 2021, AngloGold Ashanti increased its production by 12%, whereas Barrick Gold experienced a 7% decline in output. On 13 March 2026, the DRC inaugurated its first gold refinery, DRC Gold Refinery S.A., which is designed to handle the entire gold value chain, from purchasing raw gold to refining and producing gold bars, and was established through a collaboration between DRC Gold Trading and Tanzania-based Lunga Mining. According to Minister of Mines Louis Watum Kabamba, the refinery marks the first time the country can process its strategic minerals domestically under improved conditions, including fair pricing and improved infrastructure, and could help position the DRC as a major exporter of highly refined (99.9%) gold. Its initial output capacity is estimated at 500–600 kilograms per month, equivalent to more than seven tonnes per year.

Gold mining in the DRC is often associated with conflict dynamics, as illegally extracted gold is often smuggled across borders, particularly into neighboring countries such as Uganda and Rwanda, where it is used to finance armed groups operating within the country. In August 2021, South Kivu governor Théo Ngwabidje Kasi prohibited six small Chinese mining companies from operating in the province due to failure to register their businesses, a decision that was later supported by the Chinese Ministry of Foreign Affairs. In March 2022, the United States Department of the Treasury imposed sanctions on African Gold Refinery Ltd., a Uganda-based refinery owned by Belgian businessman Alain François Viviane Goetz, accusing it of processing large volumes of gold originating from the DRC without proper due diligence. In December 2022, the European Union also sanctioned Goetz in connection with these activities.

=== Lithium ===
The DRC has globally significant lithium reserves. Although the country had no operational lithium mines as of 2022, several mining projects were under development. Among the most notable deposits is the Manono-Kitolo Mine, which previously produced tin and coltan before ceasing operations in 1982. In the provinces of Tanganyika and Haut-Lomami, lithium deposits are mainly found in pegmatites, a type of igneous rock characterized by large mineral crystals such as quartz. The largest pegmatite formation near Manono is the Carrière de l'Este, which stretches approximately 5.5 kilometers in length. The primary mineral extracted is spodumene, a lithium-aluminum compound, which undergoes mechanical crushing and chemical processing, including sulfuric acid treatment, to produce highly refined crystalline lithium powder.

=== 3T minerals ===
The 3T minerals (tin, tantalum, and tungsten) are part of the tin-bearing mineral sector, and their processing involves a mix of basic and occasionally more advanced techniques. Tin-bearing deposits are found solely in the eastern region, forming a long mineral corridor of roughly 700 kilometers that runs from northern Kivu through Maniema and South Kivu into central Katanga, where it ends north of Kolwezi, passing through Maniema and South Kivu, where the corridor reaches its greatest width. Masisi Territory in North Kivu is a key production area for cassiterite, coltan, wolframite, and tourmaline, as part of a continuous highland mining zone that extends into Kalehe Territory in South Kivu. The concessions in Kalehe Territory, especially the Numbi-Gungu plateau region, officially belong to the state-owned company Société Aurifère du Kivu et du Maniema (Sakima). However, these former pastoral lands are mainly controlled by Tutsi farmers who returned to Rwanda after the 1994 genocide and by former officials of the rebel group Rally for Congolese Democracy (RCD). Some sold their properties to Congolese nationals who stayed behind, while others still manage operations through local intermediaries. This mining zone lies about 70 km from Goma and roughly 130 km from Bukavu through the main national road.

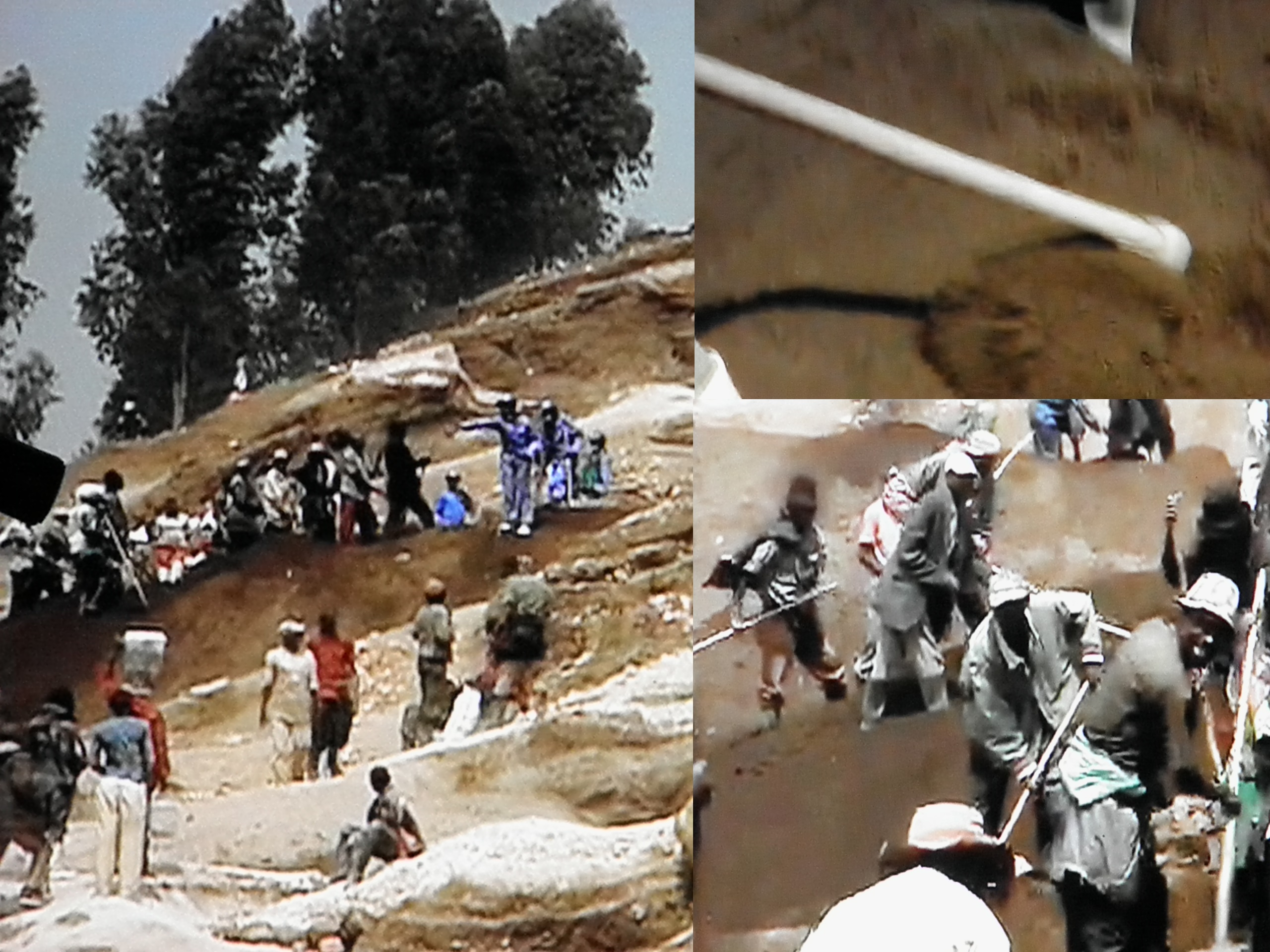
Several miners working manually, digging into the earth to extract coltan in Masisi Territory of the North Kivu province

Tin ore extraction in the Belgian Congo dates back to 1919 with Géomines' operations in Manono's alluvial deposits, a company that later became Zairetain and then Cominière. In the Kivu region (Maniema, North Kivu, and South Kivu), cassiterite was only discovered in 1926 at Zalya in South Kivu, and mining operations started six years later in 1932 after the creation of colonial mining companies such as Sokamines, Syndicat Miniere de l'Etain (Symetain), Compagnie Minière des Grands-Lacs (MGL), Kivumine, Phibraki, and Cobemine. These firms were gradually merged to form Société Minière et Industrielle du Kivu (Sominki) in 1976, later replaced by Société Aurifère du Kivu et du Maniema (Sakima) for cassiterite and related minerals, while Banro Corporation took over gold concessions. By the early 1990s, industrial mining had largely collapsed due to the lack of appropriate machinery for exploiting hard-rock pegmatite, and the smelting plant shut down in 1993. Artisanal mining subsequently expanded, especially after 1993, as mining companies and cooperatives began to form. In Maniema, mining initially concentrated on alluvial deposits because they were easier to access and required only simple equipment such as shovels, pickaxes, mining bars, wheelbarrows, and sluice systems powered by water. In the greater Kamisuku area of Maniema, some mechanized methods were introduced, combining manual excavation with dragline equipment, conveyor systems, and jig-based ore processing.

Starting in the 1970s, once eluvial deposits were largely depleted, mining companies operating in Maniema faced the difficult task of shifting toward primary ore exploitation. The earlier transition from alluvial to eluvial mining had been relatively successful, but moving to primary deposits required far more advanced techniques. Through successive mergers, these companies were eventually consolidated into Sominki in 1976. Although this reduced costs, it failed to bring the investment and technical modernization needed for deep ore extraction, mainly because shareholders were reluctant to finance expensive mechanized systems. It was not until 1982 that limited mining equipment and small-scale processing facilities were introduced in certain Kalima sites, producing only a temporary improvement in output. However, the 1985 collapse in tin prices led to widespread mine closures and workforce reductions. By 1991, when tin prices fell to around €3,000 per ton, industrial mining ceased entirely. What remained was a "semi-industrial" system based on informal subcontracting, where laid-off workers organized themselves to extract ore and deliver it to the company. The conflicts from 1996 to 2003, including the First Congo War under the AFDL and the Second Congo War under the RCD rebellion, also devastated the mining sector, as these wars destroyed infrastructure and halted production. Around 2000, artisanal mining took over under RCD rebel control and became embedded in informal, often criminal networks. Minerals were then exported through Rwanda, which recorded them as its own production. Even today, artisanal output from Sakima concessions is purchased by trading houses linked to mining authorities. This cross-border export system has contributed to Rwanda being recognized as a major cassiterite producer, while traders from Goma and Bukavu often route minerals through Rwandan companies for repackaging and re-export.

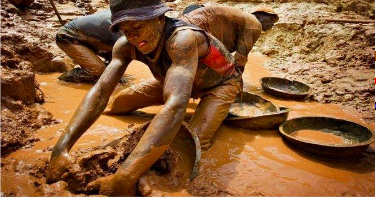
Congolese artisanal miners working in muddy conditions to extract conflict minerals.

Cassiterite yields roughly two tonnes of tin for every three tonnes processed. The term "3T minerals" refers not only to tin (commonly derived from cassiterite), but also to tantalum and tungsten. Tantalite is often associated with columbite, which forms the complex known as columbite-tantalite, or coltan. Tantalum is extracted from tantalite, while niobium is obtained from columbite. The word coltan, now widely used internationally, originated in the Sominki context as an abbreviation for columbite-tantalite. Coltan is a black mineral that must be distinguished from other dark minerals such as cassiterite, wolframite, and ilmenite. Artisanal miners often use a rudimentary test that involves rubbing a grain of coltan against quartz or a rough porcelain surface, which leaves a brownish streak. A more reliable method involves treating the sample with potassium hydroxide (KOH), after which rinsed grains are coated with a thin white film. Because tantalum is rarer than niobium, the value of coltan largely comes from its tantalite content. Tantalum, discovered in 1802 and isolated in 1820, is a dense, bluish-grey metal known for its hardness, corrosion resistance, and excellent conductivity, with a melting point of 3,056.85 °C. It is widely used in electronics such as smartphones, computers, cameras, LCD screens, and GPS devices. Coltan deposits are found in Maniema, North Kivu, and South Kivu (formerly mined by Sominki until 1996), as well as the Tanganyika province, especially the Manono area, which was once operated by Zairetain. These regions are part of a geologically metamorphic and magmatic terrain. In the DRC, coltan is typically associated with cassiterite and only occasionally with ilmenite or gold, always near tin deposits. It is therefore recovered as a by-product of tin mining and separated using magnetic processes due to its ferromagnetic properties. Sominki began separating coltan from cassiterite concentrates in 1946. Major reserves are found in Maniema, particularly north of Kindu in Ona, near Kalima. Wolframite is a tungsten ore, the main source of tungsten metal. In this mineral group, iron and manganese may not always coexist. Without manganese, it is called ferberite; without iron, it is hübnerite. Pure forms are rare, and the minerals are usually found mixed in varying proportions. Occasionally, calcium replaces iron and manganese, in which case the mineral is known as scheelite. Scheelite is uncommon in the mineral deposits of the DRC, where ferberite and hübnerite constitute the main tungsten-bearing minerals. Wolframite is typically found in association with cassiterite, but not with coltan, which is advantageous given that coltan is ferromagnetic while cassiterite is not. In the DRC, wolframite deposits are concentrated in Maniema, North Kivu, and South Kivu, where the mineral has historically been extracted alongside cassiterite — first by colonial companies, later by SOMINKI, and today by artisanal miners.

In South Kivu, wolframite is found at Luntukulu, roughly 100 km southwest of Bukavu, within geological formations of quartz veins, quartz veinlets, and pegmatites embedded in quartzite and schist. Additional reserves lie in primary deposits formerly exploited by Sominki until 1986, while eluvial deposits were mined using hydraulic methods and primary deposits through underground techniques. In North Kivu, wolframite occurs in Etaetu (or Eta-Etu) and Bihasha, where artisanal mining continues in primary ore bodies. Wolframite separation began in 1947 in processing plants in the former Kivu region. Sominki held a monopoly over production across the entire tin-tungsten belt and exported concentrate containing at least 70% tungsten trioxide. Many mines were shut down in 1984 following a global price collapse caused by increased Chinese supply after market liberalization. Exports ceased entirely in 1991. However, rising prices in 2003 led to renewed artisanal production in former Sominki concessions under RCD control. Between 2003 and 2006, official production figures in the DRC were heavily distorted by fraud and smuggling, particularly through Rwanda. Amid the instability of the First and Second Congo Wars, much of the output, including cassiterite and wolframite, was exported through Rwanda, which officially recorded it as part of its own mineral production.

=== Others ===
Province	Minerals
Kwilu, Kwango, Mai-Ndombe	Diamond, gold, oil
Kongo Central	Bauxite, pyro schist, limestone, phosphate, vanadium, diamond, gold
Équateur, Mongala, Nord-Ubangi, Sud-Ubangi, and Tshuapa	Iron, copper and associated minerals, gold, diamond
Ituri, Bas-Uélé, Haut-Uélé, and Tshopo	Gold, diamond, iron
Lomami, Kasaï-Oriental, and Sankuru	Diamond, iron, silver, nickel, tin
Kasaï-Central and Kasaï	Diamond, gold, manganese, chrome, nickel
Tanganyika, Haut-Katanga, Haut-Lomami, and Lualaba	Copper and associated metals, cobalt, manganese, limestone, uranium, coal, zinc
North Kivu	Gold, niobium, tantalite, cassiterite, beryl, tungsten, monzonite
South Kivu	Gold, niobium, tantalite, cassiterite, sapphire
Maniema	Tin, diamond, cassiterite, coltan

Source: Fanny Kabwe Omoyi, Ressources minières et croissance économique en RDC (2014).

Coal extraction near the town of Luena in the present-day Haut-Lomami province began in 1924 under the operations of Société des Charbonnages de la Luena. Production reached its peak in 1955 with 429,000 tons before gradually declining to 103,000 tons by 1974. After the coal deposit was identified in 1911, its development was postponed due to the First World War. Later, Géomines operated an underground coal mine west of Kalemie along the Lukuga River from 1923 to 1931.

The DRC also has substantial manganese reserves located in the Kisenge-Kamata-Kapolo area of the Lualaba province, which are estimated at approximately 12 million tons of ore. Other manganese deposits are located in Kasekelesa and Mwene-Ditu. Mining activities at Kisenge were initiated in 1951 by the Forrest Group. In March 2018, the reopening of the Benguela Railway after years of closure caused by the Angolan Civil War enabled the transport of 1,000 tons of manganese ore from the mine. The shipment was managed by the Congolese state-owned company Entreprise Minière de Kisenge Manganèse (EMKM). The DRC also contains important uranium deposits, particularly the Shinkolobwe site, which is recognized for having some of the highest uranium grades globally. Uranium extracted from Shinkolobwe played a significant role in nuclear weapons development programs, notably supplying much of the material used in the United States' Manhattan Project. Even though the mine is officially inactive, reports indicate that illegal artisanal uranium extraction still happens. Meanwhile, the Kipushi Mine, initially developed as a large open-pit copper mine in 1924, later evolved into an underground producer of zinc, germanium, and silver. Despite being closed since 1993, plans have been made to resume operations during the 2020s.

== History ==
=== Pre-colonial mining (c. 14th century) ===
Mining in the DRC was carried out by Indigenous peoples for centuries before colonial powers arrived. For example, the Katanga Cross, made from sand cast copper, existed from at least the 14th century, and evolved in use first as a symbol of wealth, and later a form of currency. The accounts of explorers such as David Livingstone and Frederick Stanley Arnot brought news of the mineral wealth of Katanga to Europe for the first time in the 19th century. At the time of the Berlin Conference that precipitated the Scramble for Africa, the copper mining region of the DRC was controlled by Indigenous peoples, mainly the Yeke Kingdom headed by Msiri. The kingdom had an already well-established trade network in resources, with copper from the Katanga region making up an important part.

=== Colonialism in the DRC (1885-1960) ===
The Democratic Republic of the Congo has a long history of colonization, divided into two major parts: the reign of King Leopold II from 1885 to 1908, and Belgian colonization from 1908 to 1960. During this colonial regime, the Congolese were subjected to massive exploitation and human rights abuses. The country attracted European powers due to the increased global demand for rubber. In order to keep up with the demand, a reign of terror was imposed on the citizens. Those who refused or failed to deliver the quotas of rubber had their right hands severed by soldiers, as ordered by King Leopold II. Eventually, because of the human atrocities committed during this time, Leopold was forced to give up power, signing it over to Belgium, who renamed it to the Belgian Congo. Up until its independence in 1960, the DRC continued to be subjected to exploitation, discrimination, and racial segregation.

=== Congo Free State and Belgian Congo (1885–1960) ===
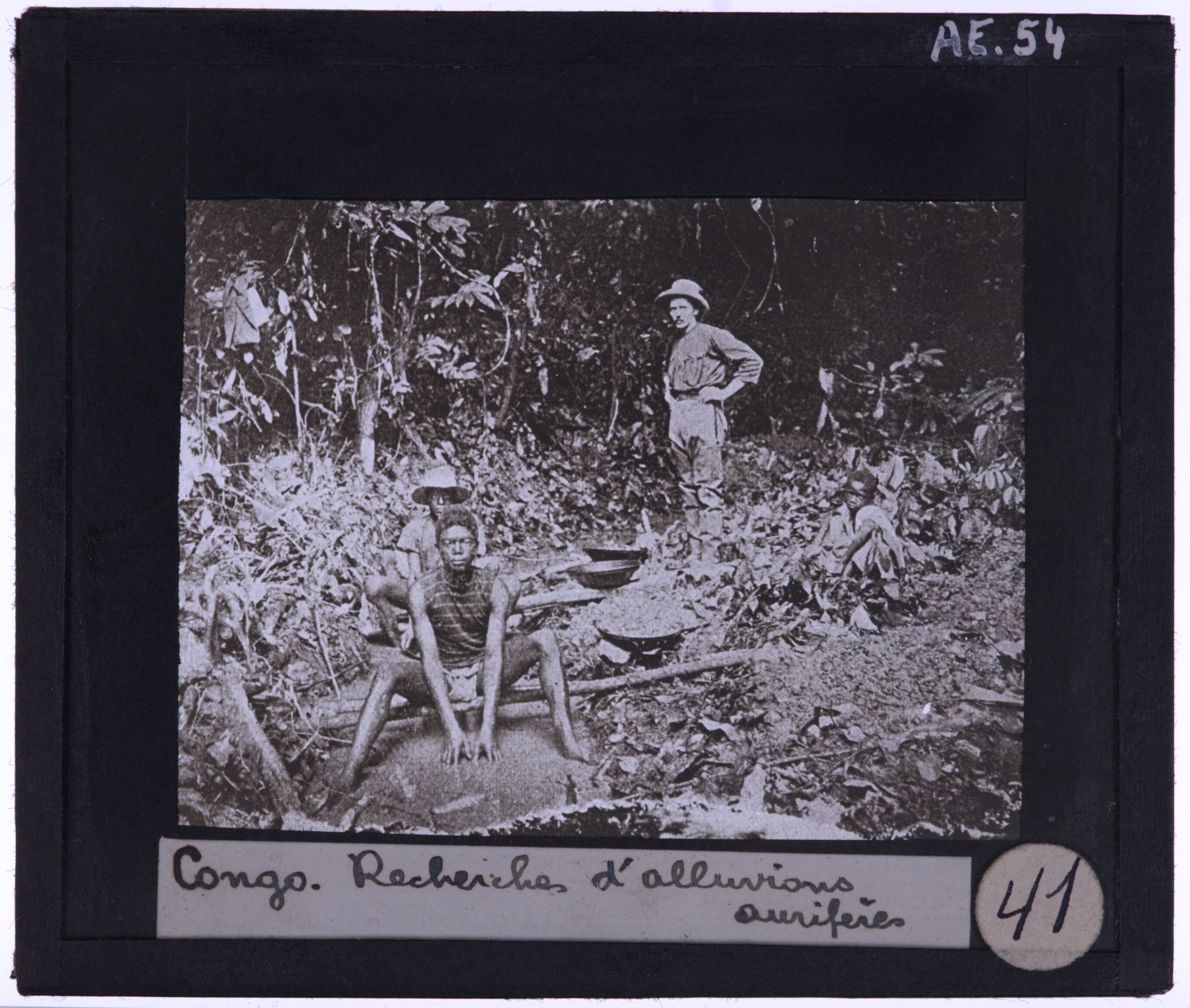
This 1913 photograph depicts aspects of labor and daily life in the Belgian Congo. It shows Congolese workers searching for gold-bearing alluvial deposits under the supervision of a European in Kanwa, located between the Aruwimi River and the Uélé River. The image originates from the publication Panorama du Congo, issued by the Touring Club de Belgique.

Several mining companies were established under Belgian rule, such as Union Minière du Haut-Katanga in 1906, Forminière in 1913, and Société minière du Bécéka in 1919. Mines active in this period included the Kipushi Mine. For example, the Belgian colonial administrator Georges Moulaert was active in setting up several mining companies, but was publicly criticized for heavy use of forced labour in his gold mining operations.

=== DRC and Zaire (1960–1997) ===
During the Congo Crisis, Belgian companies were supporters of the attempts by Katanga and South Kasai to break away from the newly independent DRC, mainly to preserve foreign control over the country's minerals. Patrice Lumumba, the country's first democratically elected prime minister, pushed for an anti-colonial vision based around Congolese sovereignty and the use of the nation's vast resources for the benefit of its own people. Belgium, the United States, and the United Nations, as well as most of the global north rejected Lumumba's ideas because of their own pursuit of Congo's resources. Their interference directly contributed to Lumumba's assassination and the addition of the ruthless dictator Joseph Mobutu who followed Western interests for the next thirty-two years.

Mining companies in the DRC
Belgian mining company	DRC mining company	Main production
Union Minière du Haut-Katanga (UMHK)	La Générale des Carrières et des Mines (Gécamines) Société de développement industriel et minier du Congo (Sodimico)	Copper-cobalt mining
Société internationale forestière et minière du Congo (Forminière)	?	Diamond mining
Société minière du Bécéka (Mibeka)	Societé Minière de Bakwanga (Miba)	Diamond mining
Compagnie Minière des Grands-Lacs (MGL) Syndicat Miniere de l'Etain (Symetain)	Société Minière et Industrielle du Kivu (Sominki)	3TG mining
Compagnie Géologique et Minière des Ingénieurs et Industriels belges (Géomines)	Société Géologique et Minière du Congo (Gemico)	3TG mining
Société des Mines d'Or de Kilo-Moto (Sokimo)	Société Minière de Kilo-Moto (Sokimo)	Gold mining

=== Mass scale looting (1998) ===
After Rwanda, Uganda, and Burundi's successful 1998 invasion of eastern and southeastern DRC in the Second Congo War (1998-2003), "mass scale looting" took root, according to the United Nations. While initial invasion tactics were still being worked out, military commanders were already making business deals with foreign companies for the Congo's vast mineral reserves. Between September 1998 and August 1999 stockpiles of minerals, agricultural products, timber, and livestock were illegally confiscated from Congolese businesses, piled onto trucks, and sold as exports from the confiscating countries. Rwandan and Ugandan troops forced local businesses to shut their doors by robbing and harassing civilian owners. Cars were stolen to such an extent that Uganda showed a 25% increase in automobile ownership in 1999. DARA-Forest Company illegally logged then sold Congolese timber on the international market as its own export. An American Mineral Fields executive allowed rebels to use his private Learjet in return for a $1 billion mining deal. Global Witness in 2004 described the mining corporations' rush to acquire coltan-rich land in the rebel territory of the DRC as a continuation of the pattern of exploitation in play since the 1885 Conference of Berlin.

=== Mining resumes (2001–present) ===
Following the peace accord in 2003, the focus returned to mining. Rebel groups supplied international corporations through unregulated mining by soldiers, locals organized by military commanders and by foreign nationals. The political framework was unstable.

The mass looting died down as stocks of minerals were depleted, and soldiers were encouraged by their commanders to take part in small-scale looting, which started an "active extraction phase". Natural resources that were not stolen were often purchased with counterfeit Congolese francs, which contributed to inflation. Air transportation companies that once operated in the Congo disappeared and were replaced by companies affiliated with foreign armies. The Congolese government lost tax revenue from natural resources entering or leaving its air fields; air services were controlled by Rwandan and Ugandan troops, who routinely exported coltan from the Congo. The increase in air transportation networks also increased exploitation because of the new transport routes. Coltan is the most profitable mineral export from the Congo, but it is particularly difficult to track because it is often listed as cassiterite, for which export taxes are lower. Coltan had been illegally extracted and sold via Burundi since 1995, three years before the invasion began. The International Monetary Fund (IMF) stated that Burundi has no "gold, diamonds, columbotantalite, copper, cobalt or basic metals" mining operations, but has nonetheless been exporting them since 1998. Likewise, Rwanda and Uganda had no known production sites for many of the minerals they exported at vastly increased rates after they invaded the DRC. "Free zone areas" make diamonds difficult to track because they can be repackaged and "legally" sold as diamonds from that country. The DRC exported few minerals after the invasion because its rural infrastructure was destroyed; mining and agricultural outputs waned. Yet the air transportation networks' new transport routes increased exploitation by the invaders.

In 2000, Rwanda spent $70 million supporting about 25,000 troops and Uganda spent $110 million supporting twice as many troops. Rwanda and Uganda financed their war efforts through commercial deals, profit-sharing with companies, and taxation, among other things. Rwandan soldiers stole coltan collected by villagers and sold it to diamond dealers. From the coltan trade alone, the Rwandan army may have collected $20 million per month, and coltan profits have been used to pay back loans from foreign creditors.

Rebel groups MLC, RCD-Goma, and RCD-ML each made their own deals with foreign businessmen for cash and/or military equipment. Battlefields most commonly centered on areas that held a lot of diamond and coltan potential and foreign armies' occupation of the eastern region was maintained by illegal resource exploitation. For $1 million per month rebel group RCD-Goma gave a coltan monopoly to SOMIGL which they in turn poured into efforts to gain control from RCD-ML of mineral-loaded land. To get fast cash to gain control of government land, the DRC gave a diamond monopoly to Dan Gertler's International Diamond Industries (IDI), which was supposed to pay the Congolese government $20 million for it. But it paid only $3 million, yet continued to extract diamonds from the region and sell them internationally. Upon request of the IMF and World Bank the DRC liberalized diamond trade, after which IDI threatened to sue for breach of contract, a contract they themselves did not honor.

Corporations and Western countries purchasing coltan from Rwanda, Uganda, or Burundi were aware of its origin; aid from western donors was funneled directly into Rwandan and Ugandan war efforts. The German government gave a loan to a German citizen to build his coltan export business in the DRC, for which he enlisted the help of RCD-Goma soldiers. Mineral plunder in the DRC was easy once the central authority had collapsed because of the extremely weak financial system, as well as the international corporations and governments that imported illegal minerals disregarding illegal conflicts on the part of proper standards.

The US documented that many minerals were purchased from the DRC even though the DRC had no record of exporting them. A lack of state stability combined with international corporations' and foreign governments' interest in investing in Congolese minerals increased the pace at which the DRC was shaken from its fragile foundation. The UN identified the perpetrators of illegal resource exploitation in the DRC, but was unable to help prevent the economic exploitation of the country.

Daily life for citizens in Congo is influenced by the country's long history of resource extraction. In communities near mining areas, frequent truck traffic, industrial mining, and ore transport contribute to dust and environmental destruction. Researcher Siddharth Kara states, "The heavy traffic and perpetual mining activity west of Likasi has resulted in dangerous amounts of air pollution. A thick cloud of fumes, grit, and ash suffocates the land." Many families live close to mining sites where access to clean water, reliable electricity, and healthcare services are limited. Adults and children may work in mining activities such as digging, sorting, washing, or transporting cobalt ore due to limited employment opportunities in other sectors. These working conditions often involve significant health and safety risks.

Citizens are displaced by mining efforts almost daily, wash their clothes in polluted streams, and breathe air polluted with mining debris. Those that live near major mines often face military checkpoints, mine security, and restricted access to their own land. Kara explains that "Although they are desperate to reach their loved ones just a stone's throw away, the villagers are denied access." To clarify this quote, the villagers are denied access to their families. Because of these realities, Kara explains that his research in the DRC had profound effect on him: "the lasting image I take from the Congo-the heart of Africa reduced to the bloodstained corpse of a child, who died solely because he was digging for cobalt."

=== IMF loan for debt relief (2009–2012) ===
In 2009 the DRC signed a loan contract with the International Monetary Fund (IMF) for $12 billion of debt relief in 2010. The loan included trade conditions, such as liberalization of the diamond trade. The same year, the IFC began working with the DRC on legal and regulatory improvements through an advisory service called "Conflict Affected States in Africa" (CASA). It suspended most activities during a dispute between IFC and the DRC over the expropriation of a mining investment.

In September 2010, the Forces démocratiques de libération du Rwanda (FDLR), a group of mostly Hutu rebels, were reported to exploit timber, gold and coltan in North Kivu and South Kivu. In September 2010, the government banned mining in the east of the country, to crack down on illegal organisations and corruption. In 2011, the DRC was accused of "selling off billions of dollars of mining assets at knockdown prices". In 2012 the DRC began reviewing its 2002 mining code. It received warnings from the World Bank, was heavily lobbied by mining companies and investors who wanted to be included in the revision discussions, and did not complete the project.

In 2012 the DRC failed to provide sufficient details on the process whereby state mining company Gécamines ceded mining assets to a company based in the British Virgin Islands, and the IMF called off a $530 million loan. At the end of 2012 the IMF suspended the last loan payments, because of a lack of transparency in the DRC's process for awarding mining contracts. The mining sector has since expanded, but commodity prices have declined and this has hampered the DRC's progress.

In July 2013, the IFC advisory service CASA re-engaged and helped the DRC adopt and implement the Organization for the Harmonization of Business Law in Africa (OHADA) Treaty. Despite Congolese military operations to take Kinshasa mines from the Mai-Mai militia and the FDLR, the guerillas still controlled some of the mines and created disturbances. In 2014 Kabila told mining companies in Katanga province to postpone plans that would require more power due to an "energy crisis". In March 2016, 42 NGOs urged Kabila to update the 2002 mining code after a draft was submitted to parliament in March, but Kabila decided to wait until metal markets recovered.

Canadian, Chinese, and Australian companies are heavily involved in DRC mining. Chinese companies, supported by the Belt and Road Initiative, have significantly expanded their footprint.

== Mining companies ==
=== Canada ===
In 2004, the FARDC killed between seventy and one hundred civilians in the town of Kilwa, near Anvil Mining's Dikulushi mine, which resulted in legal proceedings against Anvil Mining in the DRC and Canada, investigations by the Australian Federal Police and by the World Bank Group's Office of the Compliance Advisor/Ombudsman. In 2005, the World Bank's Multilateral Investment Guarantee Agency (MIGA) funded the first DRC project by Canada and Ireland as co-investors, on behalf of the Dikulushi Mine held by Anvil Mining in Katanga Province. According to the Congolese government, in 2009 Canadian companies held US$4.5 billion in mining-related investments in the DR Congo.

In 2009, First Quantum Minerals, active in the D.R.C since 1997, reported its corporate social responsibility contributions amounted to 3% of the Congolese gross national income. It was the DRC's largest taxpayer that year, accounting for between one-eighth and one-quarter of collected revenue. Since 2009, First Quantum Minerals and Heritage Oil, had their mining permits revoked by the DRC government. First Quantum closed all its Congolese operations in 2010, and in concert with other stakeholders initiated international arbitration proceedings against the Congolese government. The Congolese revocation was seen as a rebuke for the Government of Canada's alleged attempts to obstruct the negotiation of International Monetary Fund and World Bank debt relief to the DRC in 2010. In 2012, First Quantum's legal dispute with the DRC ended in an out-of-court settlement.

By the late 2000s, the DRC was either the top or second-leading African destination for Canadian mining activity. According to the Canadian government, 28 Canadian firms were involved in mining and exploration in the DRC between 2001 and 2009, with four carrying out commercial-scale extraction; collectively, these companies' assets in the DRC ranged between Cdn.$161 million in 2003 and $5.2 billion in 2008.

Canada's mining ministry, Natural Resources Canada, estimated the 2009 value of Canadian-owned mining assets in the DRC at Cdn.$3.3 billion, ten times more than in 2001, making the DRC the African country with second-highest African level of Canadian investment after Madagascar, and Canadian investment in the Congo representing a sixth of total Canadian mining assets in Africa. In 2011, Natural Resources Canada valued Canadian mining assets in the DRC at Cdn.$2.6 billion. Most Canadian mining firms operating in the DRC during the 2000s, or earlier, focused on exploring, developing, or extracting copper and cobalt on a large scale. According to the World Bank, three Canadian companies First Quantum Minerals, Lundin Mining (in partnership with U.S.-based Freeport-McMoRan), and Katanga Mining, were expected to account for over two-thirds of Congo's copper production between 2008 and 2013 and a similar share of cobalt output from 2008 to 2014. These companies, and Canadian-incorporated Anvil Mining, were involved in industrial copper and cobalt extraction during 2000–2010.

As of early 2011, another eight junior Canadian mining companies including Ivanhoe Mines and Rubicon Minerals, reported holdings of copper and cobalt concessions in Katanga province. Nine Canadian junior mining companies, including Kinross Gold, previously held copper and/or cobalt concessions, but have since abandoned them, or sold them to other Canadian or South African firms. In the diamond sector, Montreal-based Dan Gertler has been active since 1997. Seven other Canadian junior companies reported owning properties in the DRC during 2001–2009, including Canaf Group through its 2008 acquisition of diamond mining company New Stone Mining, and BRC DiamondCore. Montreal-based Shamika Resources has been exploring for tantalum, niobium, tin and tungsten in the eastern DRC and Loncor Resources for gold, platinum, tantalum and other metals. Two Canadian-registered companies own petroleum concessions in the DRC: Heritage Oil, whose founder and former CEO is Tony Buckingham, and EnerGulf Resources.

Up until early 2011, four of the nine International Finance Corporation sponsored or proposed DRC projects were for Canadian-owned companies active in the DRC: to Kolwezi/Kingamyambo Musonoi Tailings SARL owned by Adastra Minerals ($50.0m., invested in 2006), Africo Resources Ltd. (acquisition of Cdn.$8m. in Africo shares, invested in 2007), and Kingamyambo Musonoi Tailings SARL as acquired by First Quantum, proposed in 2009 at a value of US$4.5 million in equity funding. Still in 2011, Canada's Fraser Institute annual survey of mining executives reported the DRC's ranking of its mining exploration investment favorability fell from eighth-poorest in 2006 down to second-poorest in 2010, among 45 African, Asian and Latin American countries and 24 jurisdictions in Canada, Australia and the United States, and this was attributed to "the uncertainty created by the nationalization and revision of contracts by the Kabila government".

In 2012, Banro Corporation began gold production at its Twangiza Mine, after owning gold concessions in the South Kivu and Maniema provinces, the Twangiza-Namoya gold belt, since 1996. Six other Canadian companies have previously owned Congolese gold properties, including Barrick Gold (1996–1998), and Moto Goldmines (2005–2009).

=== China ===
China and the DRC signed an MOU on the Belt and Road Initiative (BRI) cooperation during a tour of China's Foreign Minister, Wang Yi, making the DRC, China's 45th Belt and Road Initiative partner in Africa. Also known as the "New Silk Road," the initiative consists of a network of railways, pipelines, highways and ports linking these networks of infrastructure to other Belt and Road Initiative partner countries in Russia, Europe, India, Central Asia and Southeast Asia. A positive move for the DRC and China relations when China decided to write off debts from the DRC and the new partnering for the Belt and Road Initiative, this will encourage further cooperation between the two countries and encourage investment from more Chinese miners, like China Molybdenum, to enter investments into the Congolese copper and cobalt industry.

=== Others ===
Foreign mining companies employ many local workers in cobalt extraction while a significant portion of their profits are directed to corporations and international markets rather than local populations. In some cases, families rely on mining work as a primary source of income, despite the hazardous labor. In several mining regions, communities have been displaced from their land, and some individuals turn to informal forms of mining to make their wages. Dorothée Baumann-Pauly, the director at the Geneva Business Center for Human Rights says, "…alternative means for local residents to earn money, including making facial masks, disinfectant, and soap. But these pursuits did not provide viable alternatives to mining, which continued, now largely unsupervised". The limited alternatives of employment due to foreign mining companies forces citizens of the DRC to mine.

Global demand for cobalt supports profits for foreign processing companies and importing nations, while the workers earn low wages. This structure can make it difficult to trace responsibility for unsafe labor conditions and labor rights violations across the many supply chains.

Private security figure Erik Prince reportedly reached a preliminary agreement with the Congolese government to help curb tax evasion and mineral smuggling in the mining sector. Reuters, citing Congolese officials and sources close to Prince on 17 April 2025, said the arrangement with the finance ministry aims to improve tax collection and reduce illicit cross-border mineral trade. Prince, founder of Constellis, formerly Blackwater, and a known Donald Trump ally, has reportedly been in talks with President Félix Tshisekedi since February 2025, according to The Wall Street Journal. Sources told Reuters that there are currently no plans to deploy contractors into active conflict zones. Instead, Prince is expected to send a technical team to the mineral-rich Katanga region, where officials estimate the state loses about $40 million in mining revenue each month. Although The Wall Street Journal previously reported that contractors could also protect tax officials, Reuters noted that the agreement remains under negotiation as part of a broader US-DRC minerals partnership. The US State Department said on 17 April that the deal would include multiple private-sector partners.

On 13 May 2026, US-based EVelution Energy signed a memorandum of understanding (MOU) with the Congolese state-owned Entreprise Générale du Cobalt (ECG) and Swiss commodity trading company Trafigura to establish a long-term framework for supplying Congolese cobalt hydroxide. Under the agreement, EVelution Energy will refine cobalt hydroxide obtained from ECG at a processing facility under construction in the United States. The MOU also states that the three parties will discuss the possibility of ECG acquiring a minority ownership stake in EVelution Energy and cooperating to expand local mineral processing capacity in the Democratic Republic of the Congo.

== State participation and mining governance ==
=== State participation ===
After the liberalization of the mining sector in the late 1990s and early 2000s, the DRC has continued to participate in large-scale mining primarily through minority equity stakes held by state-owned enterprises, most notably Gécamines. Under the 2002 Mining Code, the state generally retains a non-operating share in mining projects developed in partnership with private investors.

Research on the mining sector has noted that while privatization contributed to increased copper and cobalt production, it also reduced the government's direct control over investment decisions across the mineral value chain. Policy-oriented studies argue that state equity participation can still provide strategic leverage over key resources and support broader industrial policy objectives, although weak corporate governance in state-owned enterprises continues to limit the effectiveness of this role.

=== Ownership and regulatory governance ===
The sector is governed by a revised legal and regulatory framework, notably the 2018 Mining Code, which increased royalties and taxes compared to the 2002 version. Although these reforms faced opposition from mining companies, they were designed to strengthen public revenues. They also introduced environmental and human rights provisions; however, enforcement remains limited in practice. As noted by Marie Mazalto and Jeremy Richards, new legal and institutional frameworks have been developed to "ensure systematic accounting of environmental dimensions of all phases of mining projects. Yet… the Congolese State does not currently possess the means to adequately apply the law, and there is a large gap between the legal framework and actual practice". Weak funding, corruption, and limited administrative capacity prevent the government from properly monitoring mining sites, which leads to disregarded labor protections and a lack of responsibility for cleanup after mining. This keeps exposing industrial and artisanal miners to work in conditions that expose them to pollution, unsafe tunnels, and toxins while those responsible face little to no justice.

Between 2000 and 2020, the rapid expansion of cobalt production also weakened regulatory institutions and increased exploitation risks. Because many Congolese citizens depend on mining, particularly artisanal mining, as their main source of income, abuses persist due to the lack of formalization and regulation. In such a context, weak institutional control normalizes exploitation, enabling companies and elites to accumulate wealth while local workers bear the costs.

==== Mineral rent ====
The concept of "rent" generally refers to a payment attached to ownership rights over a resource whose supply is fixed and does not vary with the income generated from that ownership. The allocation of this rent among governments, mining firms, and social groups is often the subject of complex negotiations, made more difficult by the fact that they involve actors with highly unequal power in a constantly changing environment, including long-established and emerging industrialized states, multinational corporations, and developing countries. Resource-rich countries are particularly vulnerable to corruption. When mineral rent can be easily captured, it often results in corruption, weak institutions, and the concentration of control in the hands of a small elite.

In the DRC, mining rent mainly appears as fiscal revenues generated by mining activities. Several institutions are involved in assessing and collecting taxes from the mining sector. These include:

- The Central Bank of the Congo (BCC), which acts as the main repository for all payments made to the national Treasury;
- The Directorate General of Customs and Excise (Direction Générale des Douanes et Accises; DGDA, formerly the Office des Douanes et Accises; OFIDA), which collects customs duties, export taxes, and export service fees;
- The Directorate General of Administrative Revenue (Direction Générale des Recettes Administratives; DGRAD), which collects mining royalties, fees required by the Ministry of Mines for various permits and authorizations, and surface rights set by the Mining Cadastre (Cadastre Minier; CAMI) for the issuance and renewal of mining rights;
- The Directorate General of Taxes (Direction Générale des Impôts; DGI), responsible for the assessment and administration of income taxes, dividends, value-added tax, and other taxes.

Other relevant bodies include the Office Congolais de Contrôle (OCC), responsible for verifying the quality of imported and exported goods; commercial banks that serve as intermediaries for tax payments before transfers to the Central Bank; and various mining-related agencies such as provincial mining administrations, the Mining Directorate, the Geological Directorate, the Environmental Protection Directorate, SAESSCAM, CTCPM, CEEC, and CAMI.

== Environmental and human rights concerns ==
Mining revenues have historically fueled conflict, corruption, and violence rather than creating institutions to distribute the wealth equally. A harsh cycle was created where citizens living closest to the mines experience displacement, exposure to pollution, and life-threatening dangers of working in mines while receiving almost zero compensation. Researcher Zhaohui Feng states that "environmental pollution caused by mining dust, tailings, and other mining wastes also bring nearby residents serious health risks". As with many cases of environmental injustice, those most affected by the mines are the least protected by law and the least repaid for damage done to their homes and lives.

Some of the dangerous labor conditions are unsafe tunnels, collapsing shafts, very minimal protective equipment, and worker exploitation. In addition to these risks, many miners earn very little, around fifty cents to two dollars a day, despite the high profits generated from their mining. Child labor is also rampant in the DRC, with children sent into narrow passes that adults cannot access or they are tasked with carrying and washing ore. According to Nicholas Tsurukawa, an engineer with expertise on mining impacts and colleagues, "small children are also reported to be sent for digging in dangerous and narrow galleries…". The exploitation of children highlights these practices as an issue of environmental justice.

Mining also creates environmental issues. These practices contaminate soil, water, and air with toxic metals, threatening the ecosystem and human populations. Cobalt production contributes to polluted waterways and degraded farmland, which directly impacts the population that depend on agriculture and clean water for survival. Mining also causes deforestation in the Congo and surrounding areas adding to the deforestation issues around the world. Feng states, : ""mining increased deforestation in tropical countries, particularly in South America and Africa…".

This continues to be an issue due to the role of global supply chains and foreign involvement in the DRC. International demand, particularly form Chinese institutions and battery manufacturers, have expanded production while continuing to exploit miners. The current mining system allows companies to distance themselves from the labor abuses and environmental destruction while benefiting the most financially. Because cobalt is a key component in lithium-ion batteries used in electric vehicles, smartphones, and renewable energy sources, many corporations are very invested in the DRC's mines. This creates an unequal economic relationship where the citizen of the DRC supplies the materials but suffers the environmental and human hardships, while rich nations and companies get the largest profits, resulting in many of those performing the dangerous labor ending up in poverty.

These environmental and human rights abuses continue to exist mainly due to the gap between legal frameworks and enforcement of those frameworks. The DRC has introduced laws and institutions meant to regulate mining and account for environmental impacts, but these laws are rarely implemented effectively. Poor governance, lack of resources, and corruption prevent the state from monitoring mines, enforcing safety standards, or requiring cleaning after extraction. The lack of practice in their policies means that though protections exist on paper, citizens of the DRC continue to deal with the consequences of toxic exposure, unsafe work, and environmental degradation.

== See also ==
- Copper mining in the Democratic Republic of the Congo
- Conflict minerals
- Gécamines
- Corruption in the Democratic Republic of the Congo
- Economy of the Democratic Republic of the Congo
