= Lueshe mine =

Niobium mine in the Democratic Republic of the Congo

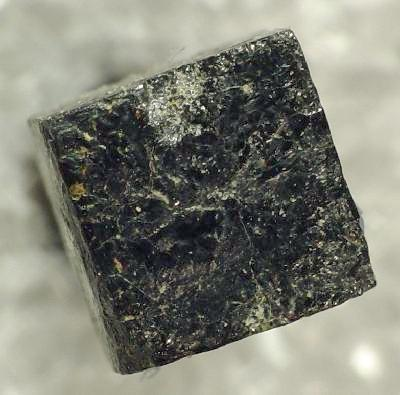
- A sample of Lueshite from the mine. Lueshite has an orthorhombic perovskite type structure with chemical formula NaNbO_{3}.

- Location within Democratic Republic of the Congo
- Location: Rutshuru Territory, North Kivu, Democratic Republic of the Congo; 0.986°S 29.141°E
- Products: Niobium
- Opened: 1982

The Lueshe mine, or Lweshe mine, is a niobium mine located in Rutshuru Territory in North Kivu province of the Democratic Republic of the Congo. The site is one of the most economically significant pyrochlore deposits in the world. The rare niobium mineral lueshite was discovered at the mine, and is named after it. The mine is frequently caught up in violence surrounding the Kivu conflict.

== History ==
=== Early history ===
The mineral Lueshite was discovered at Lueshe in 1959, by Alexandre Safiannikoff. Safiannikoff was a Russian-born Belgian geologist, who worked for the Belgian Compagnie Minière des Grands-Lacs.

The joint venture Société Minière de Lueshe (SOMINLU), founded by Somikubi and Union Carbide, was created in 1960 to prospect the site.

The mine was founded in the 1980s as a joint venture, Société Minière du Kivu (Somikivu), owned 70% by the Germany-based Gesellschaft für Elektrometallurgie (GfE), then a fully owned subsidiary of the New York based Metalurg Incorporated, 20% by the DRC government (known at that time as Zaire), and 10% by Société Minière et Industrielle du Kivu. In 1993, GfM publicly declared force majeure and production was called off and blamed on the Rwandan Civil War. With operations stopped, the DRC government requested that operations be restarted several times, and eventually expropriated the mine in 1999.

=== RCD control (1998-2005) ===
In 2000, majority ownership of the mine was officially transferred to Krall Métal Congo, owned by the Austrian Michael Krall. However, de facto control of the mine was kept by a former executive of GfE, Karl Heinz Albers, who maintained friendly relations with the rebel Rally for Congolese Democracy (RCD) faction. Albers was accused by the UN panel of experts of being a front for financing RCD and its splinter group successor Rally for Congolese Democracy–Goma, with the mine protected by rebel soldiers. During the Second Congo War, Lueshe was the only operating industrial mine in the RCD's territory, producing 270 tons of semi processed niobium a month to sell to GfE. Between July 2000 and September 2004, when the mine was shuttered, the mine produced 3,365.1 tons of concentrate, which was exported to the world market via another company Albers managed, Niobium Mining Company (NMC) in Rwanda. While Albers' operations were initially financially successful and exempted from RCD taxes, financial difficulties such requests for payments to RCD forced Albers to relinquish control of Somikivu in April 2004.

Somikivu was soon taken over by the Goma-based businessman Mode Makabuza, who became president of Somikivu's board. Operations had ceased, but the company continued to export about 20 tons of pyrochlore. As of 2006, GfE was undertaking negotiations to sell off its ownership in the Somikivu joint venture.

=== Recent history (2005-present) ===
In December 2005, Laurent Nkunda's soldiers were pushed out of the Lueshe mine by ex-Mai Mai Colonel She Kasikila and his FARDC 5th brigade, who went about dismantling RCD control in the area, for the first time since 1998. The next year, in December 2006, Nkunda founded National Congress for the Defence of the People (CNDP). CNDP engaged in heavy combat against FARDC troops at Lueshe to take the mine, with Modeste Makabuza reportedly a significant financier of the CNDP.

In 2007, the Russian mellurgical firm Rosspetssplav announced the creation of Midural Inc, and claimed to have restarted niobium production in the Congo. From 2008 to September 2009, the mine was operated by Krall Métal Congo, but were ordered to close the mine due to the ownership dispute with Somikivu. Lueshe accounted for all of the DRC's pyrochlore production in 2009, and Sominkivu exported all of this production to Russia.

In 2010 and 2011, the mine changed hands several times, with ex-National Congress for the Defence of the People FARDC soldiers (including Bosco Ntaganda) supporting Krall's claim fighting against other FARDC soldiers who supported Somikivu's. By 2014, MidUral had acquired a stake in Somikivu and appointed its manager Igor Yatsenko to head the Russian-German-Congolese joint venture, and expected production to resume in 2015. In September 2016, the DRC government decided to cancel Somikivu's mining license.

Bellingcat has raised questions about possible connections between wrangling over Lueshe and the presence of Georgian nationals who were aboard a FARDC Mil Mi-24 helicopter which it crashed near Rutshuru in January 2017.

As of February 2022, the Hong-Kong based Ximei Resources was in discussions to take over operations at Lueshe.

In December 2022, the several DRC government officials claimed the recent massacre of civilians at Kishishe was carried out by the March 23 Movement and motivated by an attempt to secure access to pyrochlore at the Somikivu mine.

== See also ==
- Société Aurifère du Kivu et du Maniema
- Rubaya mines
- Kanyika mine
