= Alexandre Safiannikoff =

Belgian geologist

- Alexandre Safiannikoff among tree ferns in the Belgian Congo, 1938
- Born: September 10, 1903; Dalian, Russian Dalian, Russian Empire
- Died: 1988; Rixensart, Belgium
- Education: Pacific Higher Naval School, Vladivostok
- Known for: Weathered pyrochlore ("Safiannikoffite")
- Scientific career
- Fields: Geology
- Workplaces: Compagnie Minière des Grands-Lacs

Alexandre Safiannikoff (1903—1988) was a Belgian geologist, born in Russia, who spent most of his career in West Africa.

== Early life and military career ==
Safiannikoff was a descendant of a family involved in the Imperial Russian Army. He was born in Dalian, Russian Empire, and joined the army of admiral Alexander Kolchak in Omsk, where he fought against the revolutionary troops. In 1920, he was incorporated into the Naval Academy in Vladivostok. In 1922, he became an officer, and moved to France, where he obtained degrees in sciences at the University of Paris in 1926, and geological engineering at the University of Nancy in 1927.

== Career in Africa ==
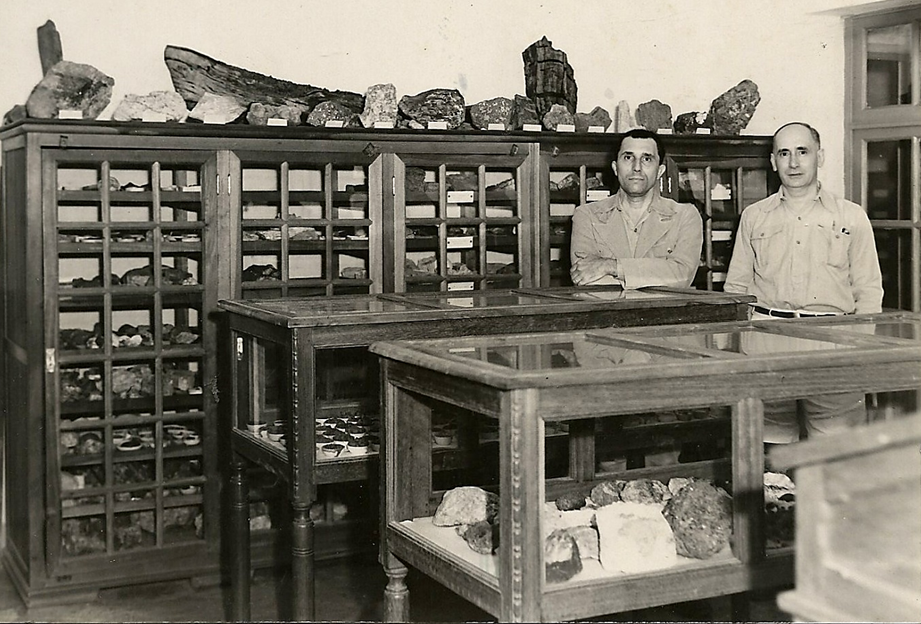
Safiannikoff (left) at the Museum of the Geological Service of the de la Lindi Geological Mission in Kamituga, 1938

Between 1929 and 1931, a French company hired him to prospect in Chad, Ubangui-Shari, and French Equatorial Africa. Afterwards, he went to the Belgian Congo to work for the Empain group of Baron Empain. Eventually, he became the administrative director of the Compagnie Minière des Grands-Lacs. He became a naturalised Belgian citizen in 1950. As a geologist, he discovered four minerals: in 1959, Safiannkioff discovered the Lueshite mineral at Lueshe mine; furthermore, he discovered Microlite, Rankamaite, and Pyrochlore, also known as Safiannikoffite.

Safiannikoff worked and lived more than forty years in the Kivu-Maniema region in the east of Congo/Zaire, where he lived among the Lega and Wabembe people. He was interested in cultural objects of these population groups, and observed, studied, described, and collected many of those objects. In that context, he published Les Warega et les Wabembe. Une extraordinaire culture sociale et une étonnante civilisation sans écriture en Afrique centrale.

Safiannikoff died in Rixensart, Belgium, in 1988.

== Distinctions ==
- Belgium: Royal Order of the Lion (1952)

== Bibliography ==
- Safiannikoff, Alexandre. "Classification des pegmatites du Congo belge et du Ruanda-Urundi". Annales de la Société géologique de Belgique (78): 57–69.
- Safiannikoff, Alexandre (1980). Instinct humain et inhumain (in French). La pensée universelle.
- Safiannikoff, Alexandre (2022). Les Warega et les Wabembe Une extraordinaire culture sociale et une étonnante civilisation sans écriture en Afrique centrale (PDF) (in French).
