= Sakima =

Sakima may refer to:

- Allowat Sakima, the chief portrayed in the induction ceremonies of the Order of the Arrow
- Sakima, the Japanese saboteur who fights the actor David Bacon in the movie series The Masked Marvel
- Sakima, English singer
- Société Aurifère du Kivu et du Maniema, a mining company in the eastern Democratic Republic of the Congo.
