= Twangiza-Namoya gold belt =

Gold deposit belt in the Democratic Republic of the Congo

Belt locations

The Twangiza-Namoya gold belt is a belt of gold deposits in the east of the Democratic Republic of the Congo. Artisanal working of alluvial deposits dates back to the 1920s. More systematic exploration and exploitation took place in the colonial era and continues up to the present, although civil war and militia attacks have periodically disrupted operations and have caused several changes of ownership of the concessions.

== Location ==
The 210 kilometres (130 mi) Twangiza-Namoya gold belt, also called the Maniema-South Kivu Gold Belt. stretches from South Kivu into Maniema. It extends from Twangiza, South Kivu, in the northeast to Namoya, Maniema, in the southwest. There are gold deposits at Kamituga, Lugushwa and other properties in the belt. From Namoya the belt extends west towards Kampene.

== Geology ==
The Twangiza–Namoya gold belt is on the western margin of the Kibaran Mobile Belt, which lies between the Congo Craton and the Tanzania Craton. It developed in the Proterozoic. It holds a sedimentary sequence with felsic and mafic igneous rocks. The basement was exposed several times to heat influxes during polyphase tectono-metamorphic episodes that mobilized hydrothermal fluids. "G4" granites and pegmatites were formed during the transition from the Mesoproterozoic to the Neoproterozoic. Gold mineralization is found in disseminated arsenopyrite and pyrite in quartz veins.

== Discovery and exploitation ==
Gold deposits were found in the 1920s. Exploitation of the Kamituga deposits by Minière des Grands Lacs Africains (MGL) began in 1932. By 1955 MGL's cumulative production reached 54 tonnes of gold ingot. Most of the workings were alluvial, but some followed veins. The Société Minière et Industrielle du Kivu (Sominki) was created to hold all the mining assets in Kivu Province by a convention of 31 May 1974. The merger was completed in March 1976, when Sominki took over Syndicat Miniere de l'Etain (Symetain).

In January 1996 African Mineral Resources Inc. (AMRI), a subsidiary of Banro Resource Corporation of Canada, and Mines D'Or du Zaire (MDDZ) bought the outstanding 64% of privately held shares of Sominki. In December 1996 Banro acquired MDDZ's share. Early in 1997 Société Aurifère du Kivu et du Maniema (Sakima) was created to acquire the gold assets of Sominki. Banro held 93% of Sakima and the government held 7%. In February 1997 Banro signed a convention with the Zaire government under which Sakima took over Sominki's mining projects. On 29 March 1997 Sominki was put into liquidation.

In May 1997 the government of Mobutu Sese Seko was overthrown when Kinshasa fell to the forces of the Alliance of Democratic Forces for the Liberation of Congo (ADFL) led by Laurent-Désiré Kabila. On 29 July 1998 Kabila expropriated Sakima's assets and transferred the mining licenses to the Société des Mines du Congo (Somico), a new state-owned enterprise. In 2001 Joseph Kabila succeeded his father as president. On 18 April 2002 Banro and the DRC government signed an Amicable Settlement Agreement. Sakima was reinstated, with the government the sole owner. Banro reacquired the gold concessions, and created four subsidiaries to exploit them.

=== Twangiza ===
Twangiza is an open-pit mine. Proven and probable reserves are 1.82 million ounces of metal. MGL began exploration at Twangza in 1957 and dug 8,200 metres (26,900 ft) of trenches and 12,100 metres (39,700 ft) of adits on seven levels. MGL collected 17,400 samples in total. Under Banro the mine began commercial production on 1 September 2012. In 2017 Banro almost went bankrupt and halted operations after a series of militia attacks. In early 2018 a Canadian court allowed the Banro's main creditors to become its senior shareholders as part of a rescue plan. These were Baiyin International Investment, (Note: Baiyin International Investment is a unit of Baiyin Nonferrous of China.) controlled by the Chinese government, and Gramercy Funds Management of Connecticut, USA. In January 2020 Banro sold the Twangize mine to Baiyin International Investments for a nominal $1, since the mine's liabilities were higher than its projected revenues.

=== Kamituga ===
Kamituga is in the Mwenga Territory, South Kivu. Gold deposits in the region were first discovered in the 1920s with the discovery of alluvial gold in the Luliaba, Mobale, Kahushimira, Kamakundu and Idoka rivers. In the 1930s MGL started commercial gold exploitation of the Kamituga Mine. Throughout the 1960s artisanal mining started to gradually expand in Kamituga. The company's workers realized they could sell gold in an informal trading system, instead of handing it over to the company for a low salary. For MGL, it was difficult to halt such ‘illegal’ activities as artisanal miners and traders were to a certain extent protected by local political and customary elites.

=== Lugushwa ===
The Lugushwa property is in Mwenga Territory, South Kivu. Alluvial gold was found at Lugushwa in the 1920s. Between 1957 and 1963 the Lugushwa region was explored and mined for alluvial gold. After that, until the start of the First Congo War in 1966, it was explored for primary gold deposits. Banro Corporation of Canada acquired control of the property in 1996. In April 2019 Banro said it would soon start an infill drilling program, which would continue into 2020 and would be followed by a feasibility study. The Banro CEO Brett Richards said that Lugushwa could potentially be the company's largest mine, producing over 250,000 ounces of gold per year for ten or more years.

=== Namoya ===
The Namoya Mine is in Kabambare Territory of Maniema, It is at the south end of the Twangiza-Namoya gold belt. Namoya Mining, a Banro subsidiary, obtained an exploration permit in 2004. By December 2012 a total of 350 diamond boreholes had been completed, plus 2,074 auger holes. Construction of the open pit mine and processing facilities began in the first quarter of 2012. Commercial operations began in January 2016, and was forecast to produce 122,000oz of gold in the first five years. Mai-Mai militiamen, who believe that blessed water can protect them from bullets, periodically attacked the Banro properties. In 2018 they attacked trucks belonging to Namoya Mine. In July 2019 they kidnapped two Namoya workers, one from South Africa and one from Zimbabwe. In June 2020 Banro Corporation agreed to sell the mine to a consortium that included Baiyin International Investment and Shomka Resources.

== Sources ==
- Archives du Groupe Empain (PDF), Association pour la valorisation des archives d’entreprises - asbl
- "Armed robbery at Banro Corporation's Twangiza mine camp", Mininf Review Africa, 8 February 2017
- Banro, Baiyin, Gramercy (2018), Support Agreement
- Banro Corporation (April 2006), FORM 6-K Banro Corporation, US Security and Exchange Commission
- "Banro Corp Ltd – Lugushwa mining", Thierry, 30 June 2019
- Büttner, Steffen H.; Reid, Wesson; Glodny, Johannes; Wiedenbeck, Michael; Chuwa, Gerald; Moloto, Thapelo; Gucsik, Arnold (July 2016), "Fluid sources in the Twangiza–Namoya Gold Belt (Democratic Republic of Congo): Evidence from tourmaline and fluid compositions, and from boron and Rb–Sr isotope systematics", Precambrian Research, 280: 161–178, Bibcode:2016PreR..280..161B, doi:10.1016/j.precamres.2016.05.006
- "Canadian miner Banro agrees sale of Namoya mine in Congo", Mining Weekly, Creamer Media, 23 June 2020
- Clay, Andrew Neil (15 March 2013), Independent National Instrument 43-101 Technical Report on the Lugushwa Gold Project, South Kivu Province, Democratic Republic of the Congo, Venmyn Deloitte
- Clay, Andrew; Orford, Tarryn; Ojo, Gbenga; Myburgh, Jacobus; Chirisa, Munyaradzi; Dyke, S. (12 May 2014), Independent National Instrument 43-101 Technical Report on the Namoya Gold Project, Maniema Province, Democratic Republic of the Congo, VenmynDeloitte
- Coakley, George J. (1997), "The Mineral Industry of Congo (Kinshasa)-1971", Minerals Yearbook: Area Reports, International. Africa and the Middle East, U.S. Department of the Interior; U.S. Geological Survey
- Developing a world-class asset base in the Twangiza/Namoya Gold Belt, DRC, Banro
- Final Statement of the Canadian National Contact Point - Banro Corporation and a Group of Former Employees, Global Affairs Canada, 25 May 2017
- Jamasmie, Cecilia (7 February 2020), "Banro dangling Congo gold mine to best bidder", Mining.com
- Kamituga – Banro Corporation, archived from the original on May 11, 2020
- Kotze, Chantelle (25 April 2019), "Gold operation revival plan takes shape", Mining Review Africa
- Kyanga Wasso, Athanase (3 May 2013), SOMINKI en liquidation (PDF) (in French), Bukavu
- Mahamba, Fiston; Cocks, Tim (28 July 2019), "Gunmen kidnap two workers at Banro's east Congo mine", Mining.com
- "Namoya Gold Mine, Maniema", Mining Technology
- "Node: Namoya (1080894282)", OpenStreetMap
- Stoop, Nik (14 January 2015), Mining in Kamituga
- "TIN: Republic of the Zaire", Mineral Trade Notes, vol. 71–8, U.S. Department of the Interior, Bureau of Mines, 1974
- "Twangiza Mine", MDO Mining Data Online
- WBK Prospects, WB Kasai Investments Congo
