= Namoya Mine =

Gold mine in the Democratic Republic of the Congo

- Location within Democratic Republic of the Congo
- Location: Maniema, Democratic Republic of the Congo; 4.004583°S 27.551962°E
- Products: Gold
- Opened: January 2016
- Company: Shomka Resources

Namoya Mine is an open pit gold mine in Maniema province of the Democratic Republic of the Congo (DRC) which started operations in 2016. Production has been disrupted by repeated attacks from rebel militias. The original Canadian owner sold to a Chinese consortium in 2020 due to security concerns.

== Location ==
The Namoya Mine is in Kabambare Territory of Maniema, just south of the South Kivu border and north of the RP1121 highway. It is south of Mount Mutumba in the Itombwe Mountains. Namoya Airport and Namoya town are to the south of the mine. The Kama River flows through Namoya town. The mine is at the south end of the 210 kilometres (130 mi) Twangiza-Namoya gold belt, also called the Maniema-South Kivu Gold Belt, which stretches from South Kivu into Maniema. The belt extends from Twangiza southwest to Namoya Mine.

Banro Corporation of Canada has a 174 square kilometres (67 sq mi) exploration permit around Namoya with four main deposits: Mount Mwendamboko, Muviringu, Kakula and Namoya Summit. The mine is on the western margin of the Kibaran Mobile Belt, which formed between 1.4Ga and 0.9Ga. The belt is between the Congo Craton and the Tanzania Craton. The concession lies in a shear zone that trends from northwest to southeast. It holds quartz, calcite, chlorite, and albite. Fine-grained sericite schists contain gold-bearing veins. Guartz stockworks hosted in metasediments have higher gold concentration than the sericite schists. Estimated proven and probable reserves are 1.27 million ounces of gold.

== Background ==
The privately owned Société Minière et Industrielle du Kivu (SOMINKI) was formed in 1976 by a merger of the Compagnie Minière Zairoses Des Grand Lacs (MGL) and eight other mining companies. In January 1996 African Mineral Resources Inc. (AMRI), a subsidiary of Banro Resource Corporation, and Mines D'Or du Zaire (MDDZ) bought the outstanding privately held shares of SOMINKI. AMRI and MDZZ each owned 35% of SOMINKI, while the government of Zaire held the remaining 28%. In December 1996 Banro acquired MDDZ's 36% share. Early in 1997 Société Aurifère du Kivu et du Maniema (SAKIMA) was created to acquire the gold assets of SOMINKI. Banro held 93% of SAKIMA and the government held 7%. In July 1998 President Laurent-Désiré Kabila expropriated SAKIMA's gold assets by presidential decree. Banro sought compensation, and in April 2002 the DRC government settled with Banro. Banro now held 100% of the Namoya property through its subsidiary Namoya Mining.

== Exploration, development and operation ==
Namoya Mining obtained an exploration permit in 2004. That year the company began geochemical sampling of soil, adits and trenches. More detailed sampling and mapping were conducted in 2005. A second phase of exploration in 2007 gave higher resource estimates with greater confidence. In a third phase the total boreholes drilled rose to 296. After further exploration in November–December 2012 a total of 350 diamond boreholes had been completed, plus 2,074 auger holes.

Construction of the mine began in the first quarter of 2012. Banro Corporation invested $170 million in developing the mine. Over 800 kilometres (500 mi) of road were built or rehabilitated to provide access to the site. Construction of the plant began towards the end of 2012. The first gold from the Nampoya workings was poured in December 2013. Commercial operations began in January 2016, and was forecast to produce 122,000oz of gold in the first five years.

In 2017 a convoy of 23 contractor trucks en route to Namoya mine was caught in a battle between the DRC armed forces and rebel militiamen. Banro evacuated mine staff, but resumed operations in July 2017. That year Banro almost went bankrupt and halted operations after a series of militia attacks. In early 2018 a Canadian court allowed the Banro's main creditors to become its senior shareholders as part of a rescue plan. These were Baiyin International Investment, (Note: Baiyin International Investment is a unit of Baiyin Nonferrous of China.) controlled by the Chinese government, and Gramercy Funds Management of Connecticut, USA.

Mai Mai militiamen, who believe that blessed water can protect them from bullets, continued to periodically attack the Banro properties. In 2018 they attacked trucks belonging to Namoya Mine. In July 2019 they kidnapped two Namoya workers, one from South Africa and one from Zimbabwe. In February 2020 it was reported that Banro Corporation wanted to leave the country and was going to offer its Namoya mine for sale at a very low price, since the government was not keeping its staff and assets safe. In June 2020 Banro Corporation agreed to sell the mine to a consortium that included Baiyin International Investment and Shomka Resources. It would receive a perpetual royalty for all production from the mine.

== Technology ==
The open pit mining uses standard techniques, with ore drilled and blasted, then loaded by hydraulic excavators into 40 tonne capacity dump trucks. The ore is separated by gravity, crushed, then processed by a hybrid leach plant that combines heap leach, gravity gold recovery and a carbon-in-leach (CIL) plant. Initial construction included the primary crusher, the conveyor belt and stockpiles of primary product and crushed product. A milling/carbon-in-leach plant was installed in the second phase. Power is provided by diesel generators.

== Sources ==
- Banro, Baiyin, Gramercy (2018), Support Agreement
- "Canadian miner Banro agrees sale of Namoya mine in Congo", Mining Weekly, Creamer Media, 23 June 2020
- Clay, Andrew; Orford, Tarryn; Ojo, Gbenga; Myburgh, Jacobus; Chirisa, Munyaradzi; Dyke, S. (12 May 2014), Independent National Instrument 43-101 Technical Report on the Namoya Gold Project, Maniema Province, Democratic Republic of the Congo, VenmynDeloitte
- Developing a world-class asset base in the Twangiza/Namoya Gold Belt, DRC, Banro
- Jamasmie, Cecilia (7 February 2020), "Banro dangling Congo gold mine to best bidder", Mining.com
- Mahamba, Fiston; Cocks, Tim (28 July 2019), "Gunmen kidnap two workers at Banro's east Congo mine", Mining.com
- "Namoya Gold Mine, Maniema", Mining Technology
- "Namoya Mine", MDO Mining Data Online
- "Namoya mine resumes operations", MiningJournal, 7 July 2017
- "Node: Namoya (1080894282)", OpenStreetMap
- Stoop, Nik (14 January 2015), Mining in Kamituga
