= Lugushwa Airport =

Airport in the Democratic Republic of the Congo

- IATA: none; ICAO: FZPC

Summary
- Airport type: Public
- Serves: Lugushwa
- Elevation AMSL: 2,300 ft / 701 m
- Coordinates: 3°21′25″S 27°52′15″E

Map
- Location of the airport in Democratic Republic of the Congo

Runways
Direction	Length		Surface
Direction	m	ft	Surface
18/36	520	1,706	Grass
- Sources: HERE Maps/2014 GCM Google Maps/2001

Lugushwa Airport (ICAO: FZPC) is an airstrip serving the gold-mining town of Lugushwa in Sud-Kivu Province, Democratic Republic of the Congo.

== See also ==
- Transport in the Democratic Republic of the Congo
- List of airports in the Democratic Republic of the Congo
