= Kamituga Airport =

- IATA: none; ICAO: FZPB

Summary
- Airport type: Public
- Serves: Kamituga
- Elevation AMSL: 3,871 ft / 1,180 m
- Coordinates: 3°02′45″S 28°10′05″E

Map
- Location of the airport in Democratic Republic of the Congo

Runways
Direction	Length		Surface
Direction	m	ft	Surface
11/29	750	2,461	Gravel
- Sources: Google Maps GCM

Kamituga Airport (ICAO: FZPB) is an airport serving the town of Kamituga in South Kivu Province, Democratic Republic of the Congo.

The airport is in a shallow valley, with rising terrain in all quadrants.

== See also ==
- Transport in the Democratic Republic of the Congo
- List of airports in the Democratic Republic of the Congo
