= Société Aurifère du Kivu et du Maniema =

Congolese state-owned mining company

- Type: State-owned enterprise
- Predecessor: Société Minière et Industrielle du Kivu
- Founded: 1997; 29 years ago
- Headquarters: Gombe, Kinshasa, Democratic Republic of the Congo
- Key people: Faithful Basemenane Kasongo (Director general)
- Website: sakima.cd

Société Aurifère du Kivu et du Maniema, SARL (SAKIMA) is a Congolese state-owned mining company which holds interests in various gold and tin mines in the provinces of Maniema, North Kivu and South Kivu in the eastern Democratic Republic of the Congo. The company's operations are based in the town of Kalima.

== History ==
SAKIMA was founded in 1997 to take over the assets of Société Minière et Industrielle du Kivu. SAKIMA was originally 93% owned by the Canada-based Banro Resource Corporation and 7% owned by the DRC government. Laurent-Désiré Kabila's administration wanted SAKIMA to invest hundreds of millions into reviving its cassiterite, coltan, and gold mines, but Banro refused as it was only interested in the gold mines. Relations between Banro and the government deteriorated, and the SAKIMA's mining agreements were revoked by presidential degree in July 1998 and transferred to Société des Mines du Congo SARL (SOMICO), a new wholly Congolese state-owned corporation. This prompted Banro to file a $1 billion lawsuit at the International Centre for Settlement of Investment Disputes. Following the ascension of Joseph Kabila as president of the DRC, the matter was ultimately settled out of court in April 2002, with Banro getting a 100% interest in the Twangiza, Kamituga, Lugushwa, and Namoya gold mines for a 30 year term. The 2002 agreement reinstated SAKIMA as a wholly Congolese state-owned corporation.

In August 1998, a few days after SAKIMA's mining rights were revoked, Rally for Congolese Democracy (RCD) launched a rebellion that became the Second Congo War. SAKIMA director Alexis Thambwe was sympathetic to RCD, allowing the rebel group to take over SAKIMA's concessions with little disruption and requisition what mineral stocks existed for the war.

In 2003, SAKIMA signed an agreement with the South Africa-based Central African Resources, who promised to invest $36 million in SAKIMA in exchange for SAKIMA handing over management of its mines. As part of the contract, Central African Resources had an option to acquire 80% of SAKIMA, but SAKIMA eventually leased out many of its deposits to other companies, claiming Central African Resources was taking too long to commence operations. Central African Resources claimed these agreements were illegal, but their contract with SAKIMA was revoked by the Ministry of Mines 2007-2008 mining contract review process.

In 2020, SAKIMA signed a joint venture agreement with the Ugandan company Dott Services to run mining sites in Maniema province. The venture, Punia Kasese Mining (PKM), was to be owned 70% by Dott and 30% by SAKIMA. In June 2021, DRC president Felix Tshisekedi signed an agreement with Rwandan president Paul Kagame for gold from the venture to be sent to the Rwandan company Dither Ltd for refining, but the deal was revoked in June 2022 amid the renewed offensive of M23.

== See also ==
- Twangiza-Namoya gold belt
