= Miran gas field =

Iraqi natural gas field

Miran
- Country: Iraq
- Region: Iraqi Kurdistan
- Offshore/onshore: onshore
- Operator: Heritage Oil

Field history
- Discovery: 2011
- Start of production: 2015

Production
- Current production of gas: 14.3×10^{6} m^{3}/d 500×10^{6} cu ft/d 5.2×10^{9} m^{3}/a (180×10^{9} cu ft/a)
- Recoverable gas: 351×10^{9} m^{3} 12.3×10^{12} cu ft

The Miran gas field is an Iraqi natural gas field that was discovered in 2011. It will begin production in 2015 and will produce natural gas and condensates. The total proven reserves of the Miran gas field are around 12.3 trillion cubic feet (351 billion m^{3}) and production is slated to be around 500 million cubic feet/day (14.3 million m^{3}).
