= Heritage Oil =

- Company type: Private company
- Industry: Oil and gas industry
- Founded: 1992
- Headquarters: Jersey
- Key people: Naeem-Atiq Sadiq, CEO; Michele Faissola, executive director
- Revenue: US$8.8 million (2012)
- Operating income: US$(137.6) million (2012)
- Net income: US$(182.3) million (2012)
- Website: www.heritageoilplc.com

Heritage Oil is an independent Jersey-based oil and gas exploration and production company. Its activities are focused on Africa, the Middle East and Russia. In June 2014, the company was acquired by a fund owned by the former chief executive of Qatar's sovereign wealth fund.

== History ==
The company was formed in 1992, to exploit oil reserves in Africa, the Middle East and Russia. It was first listed on the London Stock Exchange in 2008, and moved its head office from Calgary to Jersey also in 2008. In April 2009, the company disposed of its interests in Oman in order to focus on its core assets.

In May 2009, the company discovered a major oil field following test results at the Miran gas field in Kurdistan. In November 2012, they decided to sell their remaining 49% interest to Genel Energy to repay a $294m (£185m) loan.

In 2012/2013, Heritage made a strategic investment (app. 20%) in PetroFrontier Corp. and exploration of Australia's highly prospective Northern Territory situated in Georgina Basin.

In 2012, Heritage oil formed a joint venture in Nigeria called Shoreline to purchase a 45% stake in OML 30, an onshore oil block formerly owned by Shell PLC. The firm announced positive financial results in 2013, after major successes with this oil field, which achieved record gross production in August 2013. A strong growth in revenues was also reported thanks to these successes in Nigeria, as well as in Russia. Investors were also boosted by the news that the firm had expanded its portfolio in a promising region of Papua New Guinea and Tanzania, with drilling to commence on new sites in these areas in 2014.

In October 2013, Heritage Oil considerably expanded its exploration portfolio after it agreed to farm-in two licences onshore Papua New Guinea, an increasingly attractive area for oil exploration and a region in which the firm now has four licences.

In November 2013, Heritage signed a joint venture agreement with Bayelsa Oil Company Limited, the state-owned oil company of the Bayelsa State government, to establish an indigenous Nigerian oil company called Petrobay Energy Limited. The deal positioned the company to become a significant contributor to the development of the Nigerian oil and gas industry as Bayelsa contains many of the largest crude oil and natural gas deposits in the country. The deal also opened up access to further oil ventures and opportunities in Nigeria. In February 2014, Heritage Oil's stock jumped the most it had in 18 months after a report on massive production increases at the firm's OML 30 well in Nigeria, as well as the successful conclusion of tax rebate negotiations in the country. The prospect of a dividend pay-out for investors also contributed considerably to the firm's share price rise.

In June 2014, the company was acquired by a fund owned by the former chief executive of Qatar's sovereign wealth fund.

== Operations ==
The company is the operator and holds 50% interests in two licences in the Albert Basin of the Western Rift Valley of Uganda. Recent exploration activity has focused on the eastern shores of Lake Albert, which straddles the border of Uganda and the Democratic Republic of Congo, as well as in Kurdistan. The company is also active in Russia, Malta, Libya, Pakistan and Tanzania.

== Ownership ==
In 2006 Micael Gulbenkian stepped down from his position as CEO and Chairman of Heritage Oil. He was replaced by Michael Hibberd, who was appointed as Chairman and Tony Buckingham, who was appointed as CEO.

As of 31 December 2008, Tony Buckingham owned 33.1% of the company. In 2014, Heritage Oil was acquired for $1.6 billion by Energy Investment Global, a subsidiary of Al Mirqab Capital, a Qatari investment fund. Terms of the sale included Buckingham remaining as an advisor with a 20% holding for five years.

In December 2017, Naeem-Atiq Sadiq was appointed as CEO of Heritage Oil. In 2018, Heritage Oil announced the appointment of Michele Faissola as executive director.
