= Tony Buckingham =

British businessman (born 1952)

- Born: Anthony Leslie Rowland Buckingham; 28 November 1951 (age 74); London, England
- Occupation: Businessman
- Known for: Heritage Oil

Anthony Leslie Rowland Buckingham is a British businessman and oil industry executive with a significant shareholding in Heritage Oil Corporation. Heritage is listed on the Toronto Stock Exchange since 1999. In 2008, Heritage was listed on the London Stock Exchange. Buckingham's direct and indirect shareholding is estimated to represent 33% of Heritage. This share was reduced in November 2007 via a share placement made through JP Morgan and Canaccord.

According to the Sunday Times Rich List in 2019, Buckingham is worth £425 million. He is a former North Sea oil-rig diver.

== Private military background ==
Buckingham is a former partner of the private military company Executive Outcomes. A top-secret British intelligence report stated that "Executive Outcomes was registered in the UK in September 1993 by Anthony (Tony) Buckingham, a British businessman and Simon Mann, a former British officer". Buckingham denies that he registered Executive Outcomes in London and consistently denies any "corporate ties" to the defunct organisation.

Tony, along with founder and CEO of Executive Outcomes, Eeben Barlow, Deputy CEO Lafras Luitingh, and Simon Mann were the executive officers of Ibis Air, a separate partner company that was the aircraft procurement organisation that owned and operated many aircraft for EO and essentially operated as their private air force. Ibis Air could also access Soviet-era fighters and strike aircraft from the Angolan Air Force.

He has had no involvement with such organizations since 1999 and has spent his time running Heritage Oil of which he is the founder and former CEO. He was appointed to the board of directors in early 2008, coinciding with the company's listing on the London Stock Exchange.

He was part of the Valentine Strasser coup in Sierra Leone and was part of a group of mercenaries defending the National Provisional Ruling Council (NPRC), which later collapsed. To this day his name is still linked to these events and the fall of the government.

== Oil background ==
Buckingham, the former CEO and major shareholder of Heritage has led the company through exploration finds, including the hydrocarbon system in Lake Albert, Uganda and the M’Boundi oilfield in the Republic of Congo. There are recently awarded licenses in the Iraqi Kurdistan and Mali.

Heritage Oil's subsidiary, Heritage Oil and Gas, drew attention to the 2016 publication of the Panama Papers. Emails among the Panama Papers documents showed how Heritage Oil and Gas Ltd re-domiciled itself to avoid paying $400m (£280m) in capital gains Tax to the Ugandan government.

== DiamondWorks ==
Anthony Buckingham became the controlling shareholder and director of DiamondWorks when DiamondWorks' acquired a private company, Branch Energy Ltd., based on the Isle of Man for US$24.4 million in 1995–6. Branch Energy Ltd had a mining lease on the diamond-bearing Koidu property in Sierra Leone. In the early 1990s Buckingham's military consultancy was retained by Sierra Leone and Angola to provide mercenaries to improve security conditions for foreign mining companies. His Executive Outcomes (EO) protected DiamondWorks. Executive Outcomes (EO) and DiamondWorks shared offices in London with Sandline International, another military consultancy. London-headquartered, Johannesburg-based diamond exploration company DiamondWorks Ltd. (TSX: DMW) was one of three junior mining firms that traded on Canadian stock exchanges, (along with Toronto-based AmCan Minerals and Rex Diamond) that contacted Sierra Leone President Joseph Saidu Momoh in the early 1990s when the president was seeking new investors. DiamondWorks was "an outgrowth of Carson Gold and Vengold, companies promoted by Eric and Robert Friedland. DiamondWorks and Branch Energy became "the subject of widespread interest because of their apparent but much-denied connections with two major international security firms, Executive Outcomes, and Sandline." It has been argued that "regardless of Executive Outcome’s purpose, its involvement in Sierra Leone was in a good cause. EO successfully protected a democratically elected government against a brutal and illegitimate rebel force." Buckingham resigned from DiamondWorks in 1998, retaining a 25 percent share.

== Sailing ==
Buckingham is an avid and accomplished sailor, competing on behalf of Great Britain on many occasions. He has won many trophies at various regattas including Cowes Week. He won the Commodore's Cup in 2000. His yachts are usually named after the Ngoni people.
