= Société Minière et Industrielle du Kivu =

Private mining company

- Trade name: Sominki
- Industry: Mining
- Founded: 31 May 1974
- Defunct: 29 March 1997
- Successor: Société Aurifère du Kivu et du Maniema (SAKIMA)
- Headquarters: Kamituga, Kivu Province, Zaire
- Products: Gold and tin
- Owners: Empain group 72% Zaire government 28%

The Société Minière et Industrielle du Kivu (Sominki) was a privately held mining company of Zaire. It operated gold and tin mines, mostly in South Kivu province, between 1974 and 1997. The acquisition of its mining assets by Banro Corporation of Canada was complicated by the First Congo War in 1996–1997, followed by expropriation of the mines by the new Democratic Republic of the Congo (DRC) government. Eventually Banro gained the right to exploit the gold mines.

== Foundation ==
The Compagnie Belge d'Entreprises Minières, or Cobelmin, was created in 1931-1932 as a joint venture between the Empain Group and the Société Minière de la Tele, an affiliate of Forminière. In 1973, Cobelmin Zaire was owner of five small mining companies: Minière des Grands Lacs (MGL), Kinoretain, Kundamines, Minerga and Miluba.

Cobelmin and MGL were both located at Kamituga in Kivu Province, which had a large gold mine and was in the center of the tin-bearing cassiterite region. Kivumines, Phibraki, Somikubi and Symetain were also active in the region in 1973. Philips Brothers Sobaki owned 75% and 50% respectively of Kivumines and Phibraki.

The mining companies in Kivu Province were merged in three phases. First, the Cobelmin companies were unified. Second, on 1 April 1974 Cobelmin began to administer Kivumines, Phibraki and Somikubi as one while the legal arrangements were being sorted out. The Société Minière et Industrielle du Kivu (Sominki) was created to hold all the mining assets by a convention of 31 May 1974. In March 1976 Sominki took over Syndicat Miniere de l'Etain (Symetain), completing the merger. The state held 28% of shares in Sominki, but the Empain group was the majority shareholder.

== Operations ==
Sominki owned most of the mines in South Kivu from the late 1970s to the early 1990s, with 12 gold concessions and 35 tin concessions. Sominki established a single purchasing office in Kinshasa for mining equipment and supplies. In October 1985 the London Metal Exchange recorded the largest crash in tin prices in its history. The Empain group, which owned 72% of the Sominki shares, looked for buyers. However, the only interest came from companies that only wanted the gold concessions, while the government of Zaire would not accept a buyer who would not also take on the tin concessions.

In 1996 the assets of Sominki included gold, tin and tantalum concessions and land holdings. It had ten mining permits and 47 mining concessions covering an area of 10,271 square kilometres (3,966 sq mi) The gold holdings southwest of Bukavu included the operational Kamituga-Mobale underground gold mines, with an estimated 124,414 kilograms (274,286 lb) of contained gold, the open pit Twangiza Mine, the Lugushwa property and the closed Namoya Mine with estimated reserves of 9,330 kilograms (20,570 lb) of contained gold. The First Congo War broke out in 1996 and the country became chaotic. The Mobale mine was producing 311 kilograms (686 lb) per year, but during the civil war it was overrun and flooded, and had to close early in 1997.

== Dissolution ==
In January 1996 African Mineral Resources Inc. (AMRI), a subsidiary of Banro Resource Corporation of Canada, and Mines D'Or du Zaire (MDDZ) bought the outstanding 64% of privately held shares of Sominki for $3.5 million. AMRI and MDZZ now each owned 36% of Sominki, while the government of Zaire held the remaining 28%. In December 1996 Banro acquired MDDZ's 36% share. Early in 1997 Société Aurifère du Kivu et du Maniema (Sakima) was created to acquire the gold assets of Sominki. Banro agreed to invest $15 million in Sakima in exchange for a 10 year post-production tax moratorium, waived import duties and the right to export all gold production. Banro held 93% of Sakima and the government held 7%. In February 1997 Banro signed a convention with the Zaire government under which Sakima took over Sominki's mining projects. Sakima concentrated on the Namoya and Twangiza deposits. On 29 March 1997 Sominki was put into liquidation.

== Later events ==
In May 1997 the government of Mobutu Sese Seko was overthrown when Kinshasa fell to the forces of the Alliance of Democratic Forces for the Liberation of Congo (ADFL) led by Laurent-Désiré Kabila. In June 1997 the ADFL government confirmed Banro's concession, and Sakima launched its $10 million exploration and development project. In October 1997 Sakima leased the tin concessions to Ressources Minérales Africaines (RMA). On 29 July 1998 President Laurent Kabila expropriated Sakima's assets and transferred the mining licenses to the Société des Mines du Congo (Somico), a new state-owned enterprise. Banro began a process to dispute the expropriation.

In 2001 Joseph Kabila succeeded his father as president. On 18 April 2002 Banro and the DRC government signed an Amicable Settlement Agreement. Sakima was reinstated, with the government the sole owner. Banro reacquired the gold concessions, and created four subsidiaries to exploit them. (Note: The 210 kilometres (130 mi) Twangiza-Namoya gold belt stretches from South Kivu into Maniema. The four main Banro Permits for Exploitation (concessions) were Twangiza in the northeast, Kamituga, Lugushwa and Namoya in the southwest.)

On 26 February 2016 five former employees of Sominki filed a Request for Review to the Canadian National Contact Point (NCP) on the OECD Guidelines for Multinational Enterprises. They claimed to represent 4,987 ex-employees of Sominki, and asserted that Banro Corporate had not complied with the OECD guidelines. Under the 2002 agreement where Banro had regained the gold concession Banro had agreed to seek closure of Sominki, assuming the government paid what it owed. In 2010 Banro agreed to contribute US$200,000 as a goodwill contribution to the assets that Sominki would use for final payment of accounts to employees. A 14-person committee with Banro and government representatives would oversee the liquidation. This committee never met. The NCP concluded that the liquidation process was not complete, and recommended that Banro try to engage with the government to complete the process.

== Sources ==
- Clay, Andrew; Orford, Tarryn; Ojo, Gbenga; Myburgh, Jacobus; Chirisa, Munyaradzi; Dyke, S. (12 May 2014), Independent National Instrument 43-101 Technical Report on the Namoya Gold Project, Maniema Province, Democratic Republic of the Congo, VenmynDeloitte
- Coakley, George J. (1997), "The Mineral Industry of Congo (Kinshasa)-1971", Minerals Yearbook: Area Reports, International. Africa and the Middle East, U.S. Department of the Interior ; U.S. Geological Survey
- Developing a world-class asset base in the Twangiza/Namoya Gold Belt, DRC, Banro
- Final Statement of the Canadian National Contact Point - Banro Corporation and a Group of Former Employees, Global Affairs Canada, 25 May 2017
- Kyanga Wasso, Athanase (3 May 2013), SOMINKI en liquidation (PDF) (in French), Bukavu
- "Market Profile—Zaire", Overseas Business Reports, U.S. Department of Commerce, Domestic and International Business Administration, 1962
- Stoop, Nik (14 January 2015), Mining in Kamituga
- "TIN: Republic of the Zaire", Mineral Trade Notes, vol. 71–8, U.S. Department of the Interior, Bureau of Mines, 1974
