= Twangiza Mine =

Gold mine in Congo

- Location within Democratic Republic of the Congo
- Location: South Kivu, Democratic Republic of the Congo; 2.873861°S 28.740977°E
- Products: Gold
- Opened: 1 September 2012
- Company: Shomka Resources

Twangiza Mine is an open pit gold mine in South Kivu province of the Democratic Republic of the Congo (DRC) which started operations in 2012. Production has been disrupted by attacks from rebel militias.

== Location ==
Twangiza Mine is in Mwenga Territory, South Kivu. It is about 40 kilometres (25 mi) south of Bukavu, east of the RN2 highway and north of the Itombwe Mountains. The mine is at the north end of the 210 kilometres (130 mi) Twangiza-Namoya gold belt, also called the Maniema-South Kivu Gold Belt, which stretches from South Kivu into Maniema. The belt extends from Twangiza southwest to Namoya in Maniema.

== Geology ==
The eastern section of the Twangiza property is part of the Itombwe synclinorium, a fold that stretches 150 kilometres (93 mi) south from Twangiza. It contains weakly metamorphized Neoproterozoic sediments, mostly mudstone, trending north–south. Near the main and north sections porphyritic sills from 1 to 50 metres (3 ft 3 in to 164 ft 1 in) thick have intruded into the Neoproterozoic sediments. They have been extensively altered by hydrothermal circulation, but may be derived from intrusive alkaline rocks emplaced about 750 Ma along what is today the Albertine Rift. The Neoproterozoic sediments contain small granitic intrusions from which colonial companies and artisanal miners extracted tin. The main ore deposit is a zone up to 200 metres (660 ft) wide of mudstone, siltstone and porphyry sills containing an irregular network of sulphidic veins. The gold is held in sulfides of pyrite and arsenopyrite in both the sediments and the feldspar porphyry sills. The highest sulfide content is in the axial plane of the fold.

== History ==
In the colonial era alluvial gold deposits were found upstream from the Mwana River (Note: The Mwana River is a tributary of the Kadubu River, which joins the Ngombo River not far from its confluence with the Ulindi River. The Mwana River flows northward past the west side of the Twangiza Mine site. A smaller stream enters the Mwana from the site. Not to be confused with other rivers in South Kivu called "Mwana River" that drain the northwest and southwest of the Itombwe Mountains.) to the present day Twangiza deposit. Minière des Grands Lacs (MGL) began exploration at Twangza in 1957 and dug 8,200 metres (26,900 ft) of trenches and 12,100 metres (39,700 ft) of adits on seven levels. MGL collected 17,400 samples in total. In 1976 MGL merged with eight other mining companies to form the Société Minière et Industrielle du Kivu (SOMINKI). Banro Resource Corporation of Canada acquired control of the property in 1996, and between 1997 and 1998 undertook extensive explorations, including geological mapping, airborne geophysical surveying and diamond drilling. Soon after this work was completed, President Laurent-Désiré Kabila expropriated the property by presidential decree. Banro sought compensation, and on 19 April 2002 the DRC government restored the property to Banro with a mining convention that would last until 2027.

Under Banro the mine began commercial production on 1 September 2012. In February 2017 a group of armed robbers attempted to enter the mine gate. Three of the mine's police and one of the robbers were killed. In 2017 Banro almost went bankrupt and halted operations after a series of militia attacks. In early 2018 a Canadian court allowed the Banro's main creditors to become its senior shareholders as part of a rescue plan. These were Baiyin International Investment, (Note: Baiyin International Investment is a unit of Baiyin Nonferrous of China.) controlled by the Chinese government, and Gramercy Funds Management of Connecticut, USA.

In January 2020 Banro sold the Twangize mine to Baiyin International Investments for a nominal $1, since the mine's liabilities were higher than its projected revenues. Twangiza Mine in 2021 was owned by Shomka Resources, which in turn was owned by a consortium of Shomka Capital (65.5%) and Baiyin International Investment (34.5%). Shomka Resources is a Hong Kong-based resources company.

== Extraction ==
Twangiza is an open-pit mine. The ore and waste rock are excavated on 2.5 metres (8 ft 2 in) high benches using hydraulic excavators, and loaded onto 40 tonne capacity trucks. Processing is done by two secondhand plants from Australia, one for crushing, screening and grinding, and the other for leach, adsorption and elution. Processing includes gravity separation and carbon-in-leach (CIL) carbon adsorption-desorption-recovery (ADR), with cyanide as a reagent.

Gold production volumes were 98,184oz (2014), 135,532oz (2015), 104,438oz (2016) and 109,871oz (2017). No reports are available for production after May 2018. Proven and probable reserves in Twangiza Mine are 1.82 million ounces of metal.

== Sources ==
- "Armed robbery at Banro Corporation's Twangiza mine camp", Mininf Review Africa, 8 February 2017
- Banro Corporation (April 2006), FORM 6-K Banro Corporation, US Security and Exchange Commission
- Banro, Baiyin, Gramercy (2018), Support Agreement
- Developing a world-class asset base in the Twangiza/Namoya Gold Belt, DRC, Banro
- Jamasmie, Cecilia (7 February 2020), "Banro dangling Congo gold mine to best bidder", Mining.com
- Shomka Resources (20 June 2020), Shomka Resources Ltd signs definitive agreement ...
- Stoop, Nik (14 January 2015), Mining in Kamituga
- "Twangiza Mine", MDO Mining Data Online
- "Way: Twangiza Mining / Banro Mining (419178327)", OpenStreetMap
