= Lugushwa Mine =

- Location within Democratic Republic of the Congo
- Location: South Kivu, Democratic Republic of the Congo; 3.3882°S 27.8728°E
- Products: Gold
- Opened: 1 September 2012
- Company: Shomka Resources

Lugushwa Mine is a potential open pit gold mine in South Kivu province of the Democratic Republic of the Congo (DRC).

== Location ==
Lugushwa Mine is in Mwenga Territory, South Kivu. The project area is to the northwest of highway RN2, which runs in a northeast-southwest direction from Kamituga to Kasongo in Maniema province. The project is south of Lugushwa Airport. The site covers 641 square kilometres (247 sq mi) of mountainous terrain with deep valleys. The climate is generally hot and humid all year.

The site is the 210 kilometres (130 mi) Twangiza-Namoya gold belt, also called the Maniema-South Kivu Gold Belt, which stretches from South Kivu into Maniema. The belt extends from Twangiza southwest to Namoya in Maniema. The project is on the western margin of the Kibaran Mobile Belt. Gold mineralization is found in disseminated arsenopyrite and pyrite in quartz veins.

== History ==
Alluvial gold was found at Lugushwa in the 1920s. Between 1957 and 1963 the Lugushwa region was explored and mined for alluvial gold. After that, until the start of the First Congo War in 1966, it was explored for primary gold deposits. Banro Corporation of Canada acquired control of the property in 1996. From 2002 Lugushwa Mining, a wholly owned subsidiary of Banro, has had 100% ownership of the Lugushwa project, and has an exploration permit.

A detailed geological survey was undertaken in 1999, with follow-up in 2004, leading to an estimate that four deposits held 2.735 million ounces of gold. Banro began exploration at Lugushwa in January 2005. The work included geological mapping, soil geochemistry, trenching, depth mapping and surveying. Most of the effort was spent on 3% of the property near to known deposits. Banro began diamond drilling in January 2006.

In April 2019 Banro said it would soon start an infill drilling program, which would continue into 2020 and would be followed by a feasibility study. The Banro CEO Brett Richards said that Lugushwa could potentially be the company's largest mine, producing over 250,000 ounces of gold per year for ten or more years.

== Sources ==
- "Banro Corp Ltd – Lugushwa mining", Thierry
- Clay, Andrew Neil (15 March 2013), Independent National Instrument 43-101 Technical Report on the Lugushwa Gold Project, South Kivu Province, Democratic Republic of the Congo, Venmyn Deloitte
- Developing a world-class asset base in the Twangiza/Namoya Gold Belt, DRC, Banro
- Kotze, Chantelle (25 April 2019), "Gold operation revival plan takes shape", Mining Review Africa
- "Node: Lugushwa (1160973667)", OpenStreetMap
- Stoop, Nik, Mining in Kamituga
