= Copper mining in Indonesia =

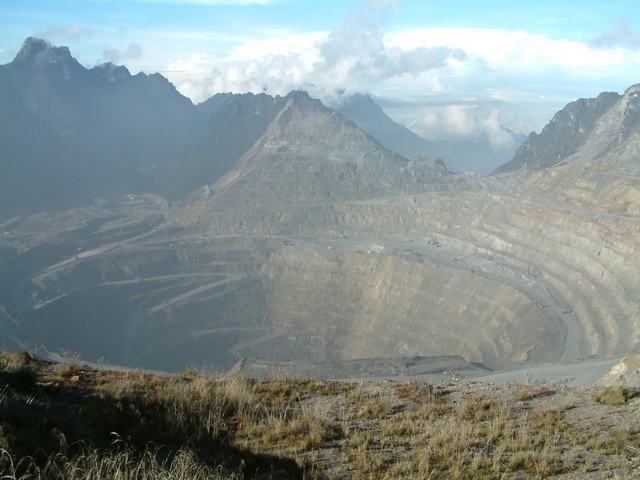
Grasberg mine in Central Papua, one of the largest in the world.

Indonesia is a major producer of copper, with the seventh-largest production in the world in 2023. Copper is one of Indonesia's main exports with smelting facilities being established in recent years. The largest copper mines in the country are the Grasberg mine in Central Papua and the Batu Hijau mine in Sumbawa, and the two mines contribute the vast majority of the national production. The mines have been accused of causing significant environmental impact through the dumping of tailings and of human rights violations against local communities.

== History ==
The oldest known copper artefacts in Indonesia were dated to between the 4th century BC and 1st century AD, in Harimau Cave in South Sumatra. Although later artefacts indicate local metallurgical processing, the raw copper was sourced from outside modern Indonesian through trade. Rich copper (and gold) deposits were discovered in 1936 by Jean Jacques Dozy at Puncak Jaya in modern Central Papua, and the Grasberg mine, the largest copper mine in the country owned by Freeport McMoran, began operations there in 1973. In 1990, further copper deposits were identified in Sumbawa, and the Batu Hijau (owned by Newmont) began production in 2000. In 2014, the Grasberg and Batu Hijau mines accounted for 97 percent of Indonesian copper output.

Since 2009, government policies requiring downstreaming has resulted in Newmont's divestment from the Batu Hijau mine while Freeport McMoran has invested in refineries. The first copper refinery was opened in 1996 in Gresik, East Java, for the smelting of ores from the Freeport Grasberg mine. Two more smelters, one in Gresik as Freeport's second smelter and another by Amman Mineral (Batu Hijau's new operator) in West Sumbawa, were inaugurated in September 2024. As of 2024, further mining projects are in development in Banyuwangi, East Java, in Gorontalo, and in Beutong, Aceh.

== Statistics ==
According to the United States Geological Survey, Indonesia mined 941 thousand tonnes and refined 310 thousand tonnes of copper in 2022, with proven copper ore reserves of 24 million tonnes. In 2023, Indonesia was the world's seventh-largest producer of copper globally. Copper, copper ore and concentrates was Indonesia's fifth-largest export in 2023 according to The Observatory of Economic Complexity, worth USD 8.9 billion, with China and Japan being the largest buyers.

== Impact ==
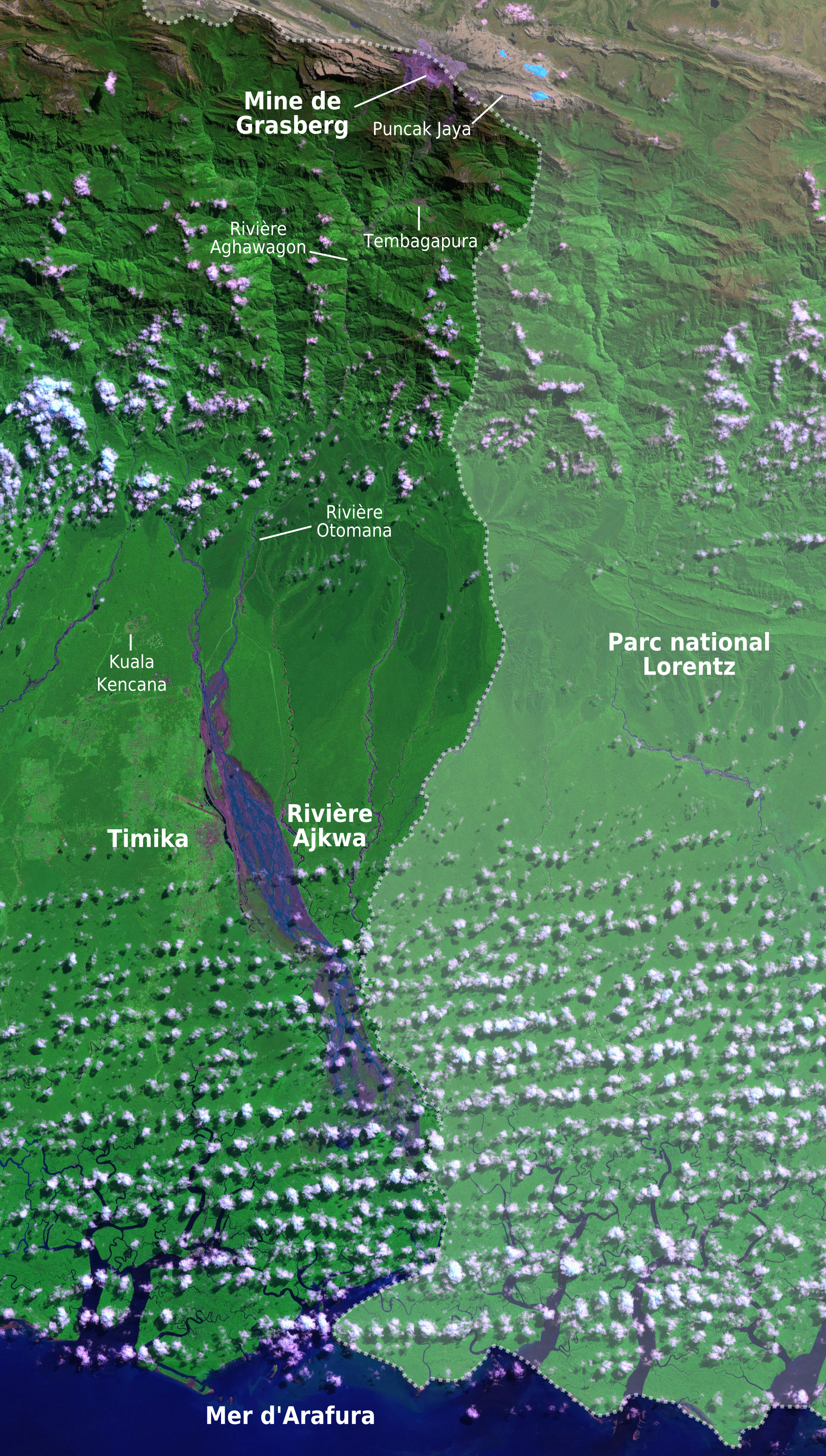
Satellite image of the Ajkwa River, showing wastewater and tailings from the Grasberg mine.

Copper mines in Indonesia have been criticized by environmental and human rights groups for resulting pollution; the Grasberg mine was estimated to dump around 200 thousand tonnes of tailings into the Ajkwa River in Papua, devastating the ecosystem of the river and its surroundings. The Batu Hijau mine has also been sued by environmental groups for dumping tailings into the ocean, while the mine operators claimed that the Ministry of Environment had granted the mine a permit to do so. Indigenous Papuan groups have accused operators of the Grasberg mine of engaging in violent interventions against strikes and protests, while communities in Sumbawa claimed that the Batu Hijau mine's operations had interfered with local land use rights.

The Grasberg mine has been cited as one of the largest single taxpayers in Indonesia, contributing 0.6 percent to Indonesia's GDP (96 percent of the GDP of Mimika Regency where the mine is located) and generating 17.3 billion USD in revenue for the Indonesian government between 1992 and 2017 through taxes, export duties, royalties, and dividends. The Indonesian Mining Association claimed that the two major mines generated 40 thousand jobs.
