= Kamituga =

Kamituga Mji wa Kamituga (Swahili)
- Location in the Democratic Republic of the Congo
- Coordinates: 3.06°S 28.18°E
- Country: Democratic Republic of the Congo
- Province: Sud-Kivu
- Territory: Mwenga Territory

Government
  - Mayor: Alexandre Bundya Mupila
  - Deputy Mayor: Ngandu Kamundala

Population (2012)
  - Total: 13,995
- Time zone: UTC+2 (Central Africa Time)
- Climate: Aw

Kamituga is a mining town in the Mwenga Territory, South Kivu Province in the Democratic Republic of the Congo. It is located on the east of the Bulega mining region and the western slope of the Mitumba mountain range. As of 2012, it had an estimated population of 13,995.

== History ==
Gold deposits in the Kamituga region were first discovered in the 1920s with the discovery of alluvial gold in the Lualaba, Mobale, Kahushimira, Kamakundu and Idoka rivers, but no commercial gold exploitation had started until the 1930s when Belgian company Minière des Grands Lacs Africains (MGL) or Great Lakes Mining Company started commercial gold exploitation. From there, MGL started to do a large recruitment campaign in the local Orientale Province and later in 1932, the Costermansville Province.

Belgian Congo provinces in 1920

Throughout the 1960s, artisanal mining started to gradually expand in Kamituga. The company's workers realized they could sell gold in an informal trading system, instead of handing it over to the company for a low salary. For MGL, it was difficult to halt such ‘illegal’ activities as artisanal miners and traders were to a certain extent protected by local political and customary elites. The problem with the artisanal miners only grew bigger, as both the search for economic opportunities and the hope to get access to social services fueled Kamituga’s population growth.

MGL also faced other challenges. In 1965, Mobutu took control of the state in a coup. Throughout the following decade, Mobutu’s economic policies (Zairianisation and radicalization measures), coupled with the instability of world mineral prices, led to a persistent economic crisis. Making the already existing mining companies restructure their activities.

On December 25, 1960, during the Congo Crisis, the town of became under the control of the Free Republic of the Congo until 1962 when the Free Republic of the Congo was brought back into the Republic of the Congo. Though during the short rule of the Free Republic of the Congo in southern Kivu many Europeans were robbed, beaten, and harassed, with many choosing to flee the area, while over 200 Congolese were killed. UN peacekeepers were unable to contain the violence. Then in late 1963, it went under the control of the Simba rebellion up until May 1965 when the Republic of the Congo retook most of South Kivu.

In March 1976, MGL merged into SOMINKI (Société Minière et Industrielle du Kivu) with 8 other mining companies. This new company invested a lot in the town, employing about 2,000 to 3,000 workers, constructing local infrastructures, and providing social services at major mining sites.

Even with what the SOMINKI did, the informal trade in minerals continued to grow incessantly and boomed after 1982, when Mobutu liberalized the exploitation and trade in minerals. While rural populations were massively drawn towards mining areas, industrial mineral production strongly declined due to a combination of failed economic policies, decaying infrastructure and fluctuating world mineral prices.

Just before the first and second Congo war the Canadian mining company Banro started to show interest in taking over SOMINKI’s failing gold mining sites. In 1997, SOMINKI was liquidated and its 13 exploitation permits for the Twangiza, Kamituga, Lugushwa and Namoya properties, were transferred to Banro.

During both of the Congo wars, industrial production came to a standstill, which allowed artisanal mining to continue to expand even more. A sense some security in the town and the hope to find economic opportunities in the informal mineral trade intensified the migration from rural areas to Kamituga, which saw its population more than double over the course of the wars. In the years of turmoil, Kamituga was occupied by several armed groups which benefitted from the informal mineral sector by setting up systems of taxation for artisanal miners and traders. The occupying forces included the Rwandan Patriotic Front in 1996, the AFDL later in 1996, the Congolese Rally for Democracy from 1999 to 2003 and the Armed Forces of the Democratic Republic of the Congo.

After coming to power in 1997, President Laurent Kabila chose not to honour the agreement between Banro and SOMINKI. Instead, he created SOMICO (Societé Minière du Congo), which replaced SOMINKI and occupied the former offices in Kamituga. Banro tried to reclaim its concessions through legal mechanisms and, in 2002, finally reached a new agreement with president Joseph Kabila, who came to power after his father was murdered. Banro thus regained the right to exploit minerals in the gold concessions of Twangiza, Kamituga, Lugushwa and Namoya.

In June 2013, the urban area of Kamituga was given the status of a city, made up of two municipalities: Bitanga and Mobale.

Today almost all of Kamituga's economy depends on the money that is generated from the artisanal mining sector. With the large majority of the population in Kamituga being either directly or indirectly dependent on mining the activities.

== Geography ==
It is located on the RN 2 national road, 164 km (101.9 miles) southwest of the provincial capital Bukavu and 45 km (27.9 miles) west of the territorial capital Mwenga.

=== Climate ===
According to the Köppen-Geiger climate classification system, Kamituga has the tropical savanna climate (Aw). It is usually very warm, humid and rainy all year round. The summers there has a good deal of rainfall, while the winters have very little.

Climate data for Kamituga
Month	Jan	Feb	Mar	Apr	May	Jun	Jul	Aug	Sep	Oct	Nov	Dec	Year
Mean daily maximum °C (°F)	27.8 (82.0)	27.8 (82.0)	28 (82)	27.8 (82.0)	27.8 (82.0)	27.8 (82.0)	28.2 (82.8)	29.1 (84.4)	29.5 (85.1)	28.8 (83.8)	27.9 (82.2)	27.6 (81.7)	28.2 (82.7)
Daily mean °C (°F)	22.8 (73.0)	22.7 (72.9)	22.8 (73.0)	22.8 (73.0)	22.7 (72.9)	22.2 (72.0)	22 (72)	22.7 (72.9)	23.3 (73.9)	23.1 (73.6)	22.7 (72.9)	22.5 (72.5)	22.7 (72.9)
Mean daily minimum °C (°F)	17.8 (64.0)	17.7 (63.9)	17.6 (63.7)	17.8 (64.0)	17.7 (63.9)	16.6 (61.9)	15.9 (60.6)	16.4 (61.5)	17.2 (63.0)	17.5 (63.5)	17.5 (63.5)	17.5 (63.5)	17.3 (63.1)
Average precipitation mm (inches)	176 (6.9)	155 (6.1)	190 (7.5)	187 (7.4)	129 (5.1)	43 (1.7)	28 (1.1)	46 (1.8)	88 (3.5)	144 (5.7)	182 (7.2)	198 (7.8)	1,566 (61.8)
Source: https://en.climate-data.org/africa/congo-kinshasa/sud-kivu/kamituga-54263/

== Education ==
Kamituga universities: Free University of Mwenga in Kamituga, Kamituga Higher Pedagogical Institute, Kamituga Higher Institute of Buildings and Public Works.

== Transportation ==
Kamituga is served by the Kamituga Airport. It consists of a 750-meter long gravel airstrip and a small building for waiting.

Besides the Kamituga Airport, the only convenient way in and out of the city is the RN 2 national road.

== Notable people from Kamituga ==
- Kalenga Riziki Lwango II — Ruling King (Mwami) of Chefferie des Basile since his enthronement in 2011. He is from the Alenga dynasty, which reigns over the eastern Lega people
- Charles Djungu-Simba — Congolese professor, researcher, journalist, and writer
