= Gramercy Funds Management =

American investment manager

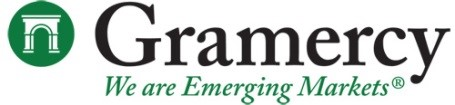
- Company type: Private
- Industry: Investment Manager
- Founded: 1998
- Headquarters: West Palm Beach, FL 33401
- Key people: Robert Koenigsberger (Managing Partner, CIO) (COO); Mohamed El-Erian (Chair); Tom Humphrey (President)
- AUM: US$ 6 billion (2024)
- Number of employees: 61 (2024)
- Website: http://www.gramercy.com

Gramercy Funds Management is an investment manager dedicated to emerging markets. The company’s strategies include multi-asset, private credit, public credit, and special situations.

== History ==
Gramercy was founded in 1998 by Robert Koenigsberger, Managing Partner and Chief Investment Officer. The firm is headquartered in West Palm Beach, Florida with additional offices in Connecticut, London, Buenos Aires, Mexico City.

In 2011, the IRS disallowed hundreds of millions of dollars in tax loss claims for Gramercy clients after ruling investments in Brazilian debt were made with the sole economic purpose of generating tax benefits.

== Investment strategy ==
Since its establishment in 1998, Gramercy has transitioned from a boutique emerging markets debt firm to become a diversified investment adviser. As of July 2023, the company had multiple hedge funds, separately managed accounts, long-only emerging markets debt, alternative credit, special situations, capital lending/private credit in emerging markets and a multi-asset fund.

Gramercy’s private assets strategies include private credit solutions, which lends globally and operates dedicated lending platforms in Mexico, Turkey, Peru, Brazil, Colombia, pan-Africa, and special situations. Gramercy also has common shares in Frontera Energy Corporation and Atmos Global Energy. In November 2024, Gramercy reached a $40m settlement with the Republic of Peru over disputed land bonds.

In September 2023, Gramercy Funds provided $552.5m in litigation funding to law firm Pogust Goodhead. It was the largest secured loan ever provided to a UK law firm in the litigation funding market. This deal is expected to make the firm $135 million a year. In November 2024, it was reported that Pogust Goodhead has returned to Gramercy for additional funding.
