= Compagnie Minière des Grands-Lacs =

Belgian mining company in Africa

- Trade name: MGL
- Type: Mining
- Founded: 1923
- Defunct: 1976
- Area served: Belgian Congo / Democratic Republic of the Congo
- Products: Gold, cassiterite, wolframite, coltan

The Compagnie Minière des Grands-Lacs (MGL) was a Belgian mining company active in the Belgian Congo and then in the Democratic Republic of the Congo. It was established in 1923 and in 1976 merged with other companies into the Société Minière et Industrielle du Kivu (SOMINKI). The company was active in the eastern regions of Maniema and Kivu, with its main center at Kamituga in today's South Kivu. It extracted gold, tin and other minerals.

== Foundation ==
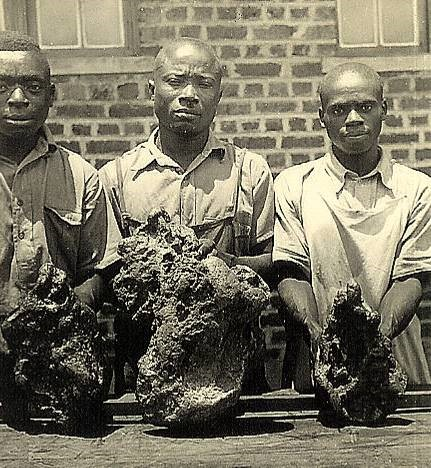
Gold nuggets discovered in the alluvial deposits of the Lukala River at the Kalingi deposit, in the Kamituga mining center, of the MGL. In the photograph, from left to right, the gold nuggets weigh respectively 21 kg and 7 kg. Circa 1946.

The Empain group was an informal combination of companies created from 1881 onwards by Baron Édouard Empain (1852–1929). In 1902 Empain founded the Compagnie des Chemins de Fer du Congo Supérieur aux Grands Lacs Africains (CFL) with a capital of 25 million francs. It had a concession to build railways in the east of the colony between the Congo River and lakes such as Lake Edward and Lake Tanganyika. Gold deposits were found in the 1920s in the 210 kilometres (130 mi) Twangiza-Namoya gold belt, which stretches from South Kivu into Maniema.

The Compagnie Minière des Grands-Lacs (MGL), a subsidiary of the Compagnie des Chemins de Fer des Grands Lacs (CFL), was established in 1923. MGL was to exploit mines in the Orientale Province and Kivu Province. Proceeds would finance construction of the central Lualaba railway joining Katanga Province to Orientale Province by way of Kivu Province. In 1927 the MGL share capital was increased to 20 million francs. MGL was one of the five largest companies in the Belgian Congo (by market capitalization) before the Wall Street crash of 1929, the others being the Union Minière du Haut-Katanga (UMHK), Géomines, Compagnie du Katanga and Compagnie du Congo pour le Commerce et l'Industrie.

== Expansion ==
In 1929 the CFL became subject to a regime in which mining was open to other companies and was directed by a committee with representatives of the colony and of the CFL. 1930 was the first year of production for MGL, when 25 kilograms (55 lb) of gold were mined. In 1932, the Empain group and the Société Minière de la Tele created Cobelmin, a mining company that prospected and exploited mines for several companies that had obtained concessions in the CFL mining sector.

MGL surveyed the route of the road from Constermansville (Bukavu) to Kamituga in 1929. Exploitation of the Kamituga deposits in the south region began in 1932. MGL acted as a state within the state, assuming all the functions and powers of the colony. The Kamituga concession was a circle with a 40 kilometres (25 mi) radius. The inner Zone A was fully controlled by MGL, and only MGL workers and their families could live there, as well as White Fathers missionaries, state agents and authorized Belgian and Greek traders. The workers were drawn from a wide area of eastern Congo and Ruanda-Urundi, and included people of many different ethnic groups. The outer Zone B was occupied by farmers responsible for providing supplies, under the authority of the traditional chiefs.

In 1935 MGL produced 184 kilograms (406 lb) of gold ingot, plus a nugget weighing 4 kilograms (8.8 lb). The company had 96 European employees and 10,360 African workers. There was a medical staff of four doctors with assistants. A 1,300 kW hydroelectric power plant was under construction. MGL was involved in the creation of other concessionary companies. These included:

- Compagnie Minière de l'Urega (Minerga), founded in 1933, whose deposits in the CFL mining area were exploited by Cobelmin
- Société Minière du Lualaba (Miluba), formed in 1932 in association with Belgika, whose deposits in the CFL mining area were also exploited by Cobelmin
- Compagnie Minière du Nord de l'Ituri (Cominor), formed in 1936 in association by MGL, CFL, the National Committee of Kivu and the Colony, which exploited MGL deposits in Ituri and Nepoko
- Compagnie Minière au RuandaUrundi (Mirudi), created in 1937, which exploited cassiterite (tin oxide) deposits in Ruanda-Urundi

In the 1950s the MGL concessions covered 49,000 square kilometres (19,000 sq mi). The main office was in Goma, and the concessions were grouped into North based on Butembo, Center based on Kabunga and South based on Kamituga. The 1955 cumulative production reached 54 tonnes of gold ingot and 22,000 tonnes of cassiterite or cassiterite mixed with wolframite or coltan. Most of the working were alluvial, but some followed veins. MGL built over 1,700 kilometres (1,100 mi) of roads to access the region, which was covered in dense forest.

== Post-independence ==
In the 1960s MGL workers began engaging in artisanal mining to eke out their salaries, selling the gold they found informally. MGM could not do much to stop this practice, since the miners and traders had a degree of protection from local politicians and traditional leaders. In the 1964 Simba rebellion, followers of Pierre Mulele from the south made a failed attempt to invade Kamituga. President Mobutu Sese Seko seized power in 1965, the start of a long period of economic turmoil. In 1969 MGL was merged with KIVUMINES, PHIBRAKI and COBELMIN, based in Kamituga. In March 1976 the expanded company merged with SYMETAIN to create the Société Minière et Industrielle du Kivu (SOMINKI). The state held 28% of shares on Sominki, but the Empain group remained the majority shareholder.

== Sources ==
- Archives du Groupe Empain (PDF), Association pour la valorisation des archives d’entreprises – asbl
- Buelens, Frans; Marysse, Stefaan (August 2009), "Returns on Investments during the Colonial Era: The Case of the Belgian Congo", The Economic History Review, New Series, 62 (S1, Finance, Investment and Risk), Wiley on behalf of the Economic History Society: 135–166, doi:10.1111/j.1468-0289.2009.00482.x, JSTOR 20543010, S2CID 154615817
- Kyanga Wasso, Athanase (3 May 2013), "SOMINKI en liquidation" (PDF), Congo Mines (in French), Bukavu
- Leplae, Edmond (February 1937), "La situation économique au Congo belge en 1935–1936", Bulletin de l'Institut des Sciences Économiques (in French), 8 (2, La Belgique en 1936), Department of Economics, Université Catholique de Louvain: 263–297, doi:10.1017/S2033641100084457, JSTOR 40742633
- Stoop, Nik (14 January 2015), Mining in Kamituga
