= Sandstorm Gold =

Canadian company

Sandstorm Gold Ltd.
- Type: Public
- Traded as: TSX: SSL; NYSE: SAND
- Industry: Mining
- Headquarters: Vancouver, British Columbia, Canada
- Key people: Nolan Watson (CEO, 2008-current)
- Services: Financial
- Owner: Royal Gold, Inc.
- Subsidiaries: Mariana Resources Ltd (Guernsey)
- Website: www.sandstormgold.com

Sandstorm Gold Ltd. (formerly Sandstorm Resources) is a Canadian company that provides funding to mining companies in exchange for royalties, principally in the form of net smelter returns and streams.

It focuses on precious metals but did spin off Sandstorm Metals & Energy Ltd. in 2010 as a separate TSX Venture Exchange-listed company to make volumetric production payment transactions in the base metal and fossil fuel sectors, then bought it back in 2014.

The firm graduated from the TSX Venture Exchange to the Toronto Stock Exchange and began listing shares on the NYSE in 2012. On July 7, 2025, it was announced that Royal Gold (RGI) would acquire Sandstorm Gold for a price around $3.5 billion with the deal expected to close by the end of the year.

On October 20, 2025, RGI announced that it had completed the purchase of the company.

== Business model ==
Like Franco-Nevada, Wheaton Precious Metals and Osisko Gold Royalties, Sandstorm Gold makes financial investments in the mining industry in exchange for volumetric production payments or royalties in the forms of net smelter returns and precious metals streaming contracts.

These contracts are made with companies involved in mineral exploration or mine development; as an alternative to debt financing or issuing additional shares, the mining company seeking capital funding may agree to a contract with the royalty company to pay a percentage of its future income or products from the mine. For example, in Q1 2017 Sandstorm acquired 22 new net smelter return royalties for US$1.9 million.

The firm completed transactions with multiple junior mining companies including Kivalliq Energy, Evrim Resources, Tower Resources, Copper Fox Metals, Millrock Resources and Condor Resources.

== Corporate history ==
The company was incorporated as Sandstorm Resources Ltd on March 23, 2007, and headquartered in Vancouver, British Columbia. Nolan Watson had been the chief financial officer of Wheaton Precious Metals which had pioneered the use of volumetric production payments in the gold mining industry and, along with co-worker David Awram, sought to spin off that business model into a separate company.

During its initial public offering it raised CAD$200,000 in August 2007 with the shares being listed on the TSX Venture Exchange at 20 cents per share. It raised over CAD$100 million in further public offerings throughout 2009-10. The company used the funds raised from the public stock offerings to negotiate the terms of the streaming contracts.

In 2010, the company spun off Sandstorm Metals & Energy Ltd. to hold its base metal and fossil fuel contracts, at the time it had interests in a copper mine and a natural gas project. Sandstorm Metals existed as a separate TSX Venture Exchange-listed company, with Watson as CEO, until it was bought back by Sandstorm in 2014 after its first few investments, in coal and natural gas, proved unprofitable. In the meantime, Sandstorm Resources changed its name to Sandstorm Gold in February 2011.

In 2012, after a 5:1 share consolidation, its shares graduated to the Toronto Stock Exchange where it raised a further CAD$150 million at $10 per share and became listed on New York Stock Exchange. In 2013, Sandstorm Gold acquired Premier Royalty, which was the royalty-only spin off company of Premier Gold, and in 2014 it acquired a Diavik Diamond stream from Iamgold. Further acquisitions included Mariana Resources Ltd for their 30% interest in the Hot Maden gold-copper project in Artvin, Turkey.
