= OR Royalties =

Canadian mining company

OR Royalties Inc.
- Type: Public
- Traded as: TSX: OR; NYSE: OR
- Industry: Mining
- Predecessor: Osisko Gold Royalties (2014-2025)
- Founded: April 29, 2014
- Headquarters: Montreal, Quebec, Canada
- Key people: Jason Attew (President & CEO, 2024-present)
- Products: Precious Metals Royalties and Streams
- Number of employees: 28
- Website: orroyalties.com/en/

OR Royalties Inc. is a Canadian company that holds royalties in gold, silver and diamond mines, principally in the form of net smelter return royalties and streams. Like its predecessor company, Osisko Mining, it is headquartered in Montreal, Quebec, with shares listed on the Toronto Stock Exchange and the New York Stock Exchange.

== Business model ==
Like Franco-Nevada, Wheaton Precious Metals and Sandstorm Gold, OR Royalties makes investments in the mining industry and transfers profits to shareholders through regular dividend payments. Its profits principally come from royalties, net smelter returns and precious metals streaming contracts with producing mines. These contracts are made with companies involved in mineral exploration or mine development; as an alternative to debt financing or issuing additional shares, the mining company seeking capital funding may agree to a contract with the royalty company to pay a percentage of its future income or products from the mine.

== Corporate history ==
OR Royalties (formerly Osisko Gold Royalties) is a spin-off company that was incorporated on April 29, 2014. Its creation was part of a deal between Osisko Mining, Yamana Gold and Agnico Eagle Mines in which white knights Yamana and Agnico purchased Osisko Mining, thwarting Goldcorp's hostile takeover bid. While Yamana and Agnico each retained 50% ownership of Osisko Mining's Malartic mine, OR Royalties (Osisko Gold Royalties, at the time) was spun-off with a 5% net smelter return on the mine, a 2% net smelter return on several Agnico and Yamana mines in the Kirkland Lake area of Ontario, plus CAN$157 million cash for building the company up by making acquisitions, and with Osisko Mining CEO Sean Roosen continuing as Osisko Gold Royalties' CEO, until his ultimate departure from the company in November of 2023. The company made its first moves later in 2014 by purchasing a 20% stake in mineral exploration company NioGold Mining and by merging with Virginia Mines Inc. The merger gave Virginia Mines shareholders a 39% stake in the combined company in exchange for its net smelter return contract on the Goldcorp Éléonore mine. Virginia Mines would become a subsidiary and renamed Osisko Exploration James Bay Inc.

In 2015 and 2017, they acquired royalty contracts in their producing mines or development projects, including Taseko Mines' Gibraltar copper mine, Nottaway Resources' Vezza gold mine, Arizona Mining's lead-zinc Hermosa project, the Highland Copper Company's White Pine-Copperwood silver-copper project, and several third party contracts that were held by Teck Resources. Most significantly, in June 2017 in exchange for 20% stake in the company plus $675 million, OR Royalties doubled the number of royalties and streams they owned from 57 to 131 from the American private equity company Orion Mine Finance Group. The deal included royalties or streams in several active mines such as the Renard diamond mine in Quebec, Mantos Blancos mine in Chile, and the Brucejack gold and silver mine in British Columbia. They also provided $20 million financing for a merger of five small mining companies that would re-unite the executive management of the old Osisko Mining, including Roosen, with the new company renaming itself "Osisko Mining". In 2019, OR Royalties acquired the bankrupt Stornoway Diamond Corp for the remainder of the Renard diamond mine and then acquired Barkerville Gold Mines Ltd for its developing Cariboo gold project in British Columbia.

== Latest Acquisition ==
- March 17, 2022 - OR Royalties International Ltd. (a 100%-owned Bermuda-based subsidiary of OR Royalties Inc.) has entered into a binding agreement with Metals Acquisitions with respect to a US$90 million silver stream to facilitate its acquisition of the producing CSA Mine in Cobar, Australia. Metals Acquisitions announced that it has entered into an agreement to acquire 100% of the shares of the owner of CSA from Glencore.
