= Mining conflicts in Panama =

Mining and hydroelectric projects in Panama are heavily discussed topics in Panama due to several laws for the protection of the native inhabitants and the neo-liberal plans of the government. Since the beginning of 2011 large protests against such mining and hydroelectric projects have been held by the indigenous inhabitants of Panama.

== History ==
The hydroelectric potential of the Bocas del Toro region was discovered in the 1970s. However, the first 70 hydroelectric power plants were built in 1998 after the privatization of Panama's Institute of Hydroelectric Resources and Electrification (IRHE). For the approval of following hydroelectric projects the Panamanian government and private investors negotiated, in accordance with Law 127, with the indigenous representatives. Corruption, involuntary resettlement of the villages, and penetration of the local politics by the Panamanian government, however, led to the first protests against hydroelectric power plants and mining in the 1990s. For example, the "Frente Santeño Contra La Minería" was created in 1997. Veraguas since the Spanish colonization era in the 16th century, has been highly attractive to miners.

Recently these protests received more attention. On 11 February 2011 the government of Ricardo Martinelli approved the neo-liberal Law 8, also known as the Ley Minera, which made it possible for foreign companies to invest directly in Panamanian concessions. This resulted, during the months of February, March, and May 2011, in large protests by the native Ngäbe Buglé people who felt the threat of hydrologic colonialism which would affect their political authority in the comarca and destruct the environment.

The start of hydroelectric projects in the comarca and the annexed regions in early January 2012 led to large scale indigenous protests and the blocking of the Inter-American Highway. On 5 February 2012 the indigenous people from the north-western part of Panama clashed with the riot police while blocking the Pan-American Highway near San Felix.

On this day 150 Ngäbe Buglé were arrested and 40 got injured, of which three persons died within a week. The repression of the protests by the police seems to be a form of green authoritarianism, which stands for the involvement of the state to secure and protect renewable energy sources and “market valorized ecological processes”. However, this does not only happen with the use of explicit violence as is the case here. The increasing influence of the national government in the native political elections, which occurs in Panama since 2010 by changing the Carta Organica, is also a hidden form of green authoritarianism.

On the 7th of February, two days after the conflict between the police and the indigenous people, the San Lorenzo treaty was signed, of which the most important points hold that: (a.) the government would participate in a discussion with the Ngäbe Buglé on the new Ley Minera and the hydroelectric projects with the Catholic church as mediator between the two parties, (b.) the Ngäbe Buglé would cease their blockade and the riot police would withdrawal, (c.) cellular communication would be restored, (d.) the 150 captured protesters would be released, and (e.) the families of killed Ngäbe Buglé would be compensated.

During February the Pan-American Highway was closed several times again in the north-western part of the country due to continuing protests of the Ngäbe Buglé. At the same time the dialogue between representatives of the state and the Ngäbe Buglé continued in Panama City. The Ngäbe Buglé people were represented by their officially elected general cacique Silvia Carrera. Division in the Ngäbe-Buglé politics, however, caused that not all agreed with the leadership on Carrera which led to smaller protests in parts of the Ngäbe Buglé region.

== Legal issues ==
It seems that the U.N. Declaration on the Rights of Indigenous Peoples, which was ratified by Panama in 2007, is in conflict with the in 2011 approved Law 8. The U.N. Declaration of Rights of Indigenous Peoples holds that “states shall consult and cooperate in good faith with the indigenous peoples concerned through their own representative institutions in order to obtain their free and informed consent prior to the approval of any project affecting their lands or territories and other resources, particularly in connection with the development, utilization, or exploitation of their mineral, water, or other resources”. Law 8, however, holds that “[f]oreign state-owned mining companies are allowed to invest directly in Panamanian concessions”.

This means that foreign companies are able to undertake large mining projects on Panamanian terrain, including the land within the comarcas, without consultation of the indigenous inhabitants. This in itself is in conflict with article 127 of the Panamanian constitution, which deals with the comarca structure as will be explained below. It seems as if the increasing laws for the protection of indigenous rights and the laws for trade liberalization are conflicting commitments.

== The Comarca Ngöbe Buglé ==
The Comarca Ngöbe Buglé was founded in 1997 with the approval of Law 10. The comarca structure is borrowed from the Kuna comarca system and follows a similar political organization which is accepted as legitimate by the Panamanian government. Article 127 of the Panamanian constitution states that the Government will guarantee the indigenous communities the grounds and the collective property in order to accomplish their economic and social wealth. The Law will regulate the procedures for these land delimitations, in which private land ownership is prohibited. According to Article 48 and 57 of CH II of the Carta Organica the indigenous authorities need to approve any projects of environmental exploitation by submitting them to a referendum.

== Current developments ==
After months of protests, street blockades, and negotiations with the United Nations as mediator between the two parties, president Martinelli finally repealed Law 8 on 3 March 2012. This was followed by the approval of the new Law 415 which ensured that mining is banned from the comarca. This decision resulted in the cancellation of 25 pending mining requests in the Ngäbe-Buglé region.

The new law stresses that hydroelectric projects may only be constructed after the approval of, and in collaboration with, the natives. In reaction to the approval of the new law, general cacique Silvia Carrera apologized for the street closures and the many demonstrations. Though the indigenous negotiators are satisfied with the results, others feel defeated as hydroelectric projects are still not totally banned from the region.

== Legal controversies in the mining sector and 2023 protests ==
In January 2022, negotiations between the Government of Panama and FQM started to define a new contract concerning the Cobre mine, Panama. First Quantum Minerals subsidiary Minera Panamá S. A. made proposals to the Government of Panamá including yearly payments of US$375 million in tax and royalty revenue. These payments were offered under the condition that metal prices and profitability of this mine would not drop significantly. However, the Government of Panamá halted discussions in December 2022 and announced plans to order the suspension of operations at this mine. In February 2023, the Cobre Panama mine suspended ore processing operations after copper concentrate loading operations at Port Rincón were halted due to a resolution issued by the Panamá Maritime Authority. Ship loading and ore processing resumed on March 8, 2023. The congress of Panamá approved the revised contract concerning the Cobre Panama mine as Bill 1100 in October 2023, which was signed by the President of Panamá as Law 406. Protests led to a moratorium on metallic mining throughout the country, "for an indefinite term", excluding already approved concessions, through Bill 1110, which was approved with 59 votes by the National Assembly (AN), on November 3, 2023. However, the constitutionality of the already approved new concession between the Government of Panana and Minera Panamá S. A. was questioned, leading to more uncertainty. These concessions have led to massive protests in many places of the country that are still ongoing, with the protesters accusing the government of corruption and accepting bribes in order to give overly favorable conditions to the company.

FQM reported, that its subsidiary MPSA made a tax and royalty payment on November 16, 2023, of $567 million in respect of the period from December 2021 to October 2023. This payment is one of the largest ever tax and royalty payments in the history of the global copper mining sector and is the largest fiscal payment ever made in Panama. However, an illegal blockade of small boats at the Punta Rincón port continues to prevent the delivery of supplies that are necessary to operate the power plant of the Cobre Panama mine. This blockade forced the mine to temporarily halt production as of November 20, 2023.

=== Unconstitutionality of the contract and total closure of the Cobre mine ===
On November 28, the Plenary Session of the Supreme Court of Justice declared that Law 406 of October 20, 2023, which approves the mining concession contract entered into between the State and Sociedad Minera Panamá, S.A. is unconstitutional, a ruling issued unanimously. Panama president said the Minera Panamá copper mine would be closed, hours after the country's Supreme Court declared its contract unconstitutional.

== See also ==
- Mining in Panama
- Mineral industry of Panama
