= Martin Kabwelulu =

Martin Kabwelulu Labilo

Minister of Mines
- Incumbent
- Assumed office 5 February 2007

Personal details
- Citizenship: Democratic Republic of the Congo
- Party: Parti Lumumbiste Unifié (PALU)

Martin Kabwelulu Labilo is a politician in the Democratic Republic of the Congo. He is a member of the Parti Lumumbiste Unifié (PALU). He was appointed Minister of Mines on 5 February 2007 in the government led by Antoine Gizenga, and retained this post through the reshuffle of 25 November 2007.

Martin Kabwelulu Labilo was named Minister of Mines by President Joseph Kabila in the government headed by Antoine Gizenga in February 2007 one of four members of Gizenga's Unified Lumumbist Party (PALU) to be named to the cabinet.

In February 2011 Kabwelulu was in talks with South African banks, seeking $150 million to revive the state-owned diamond miner, MIBA, which had been closed since November 2008. MIBA is 20% owned by Mwana Africa. Kabwelulu said that since the closure almost all diamond production had been from informal, artisanal workings. In May 2011 Kabwelulu, who was also serving as acting Minister of Transport, announced a $600 million 5-year plan to rehabilitate 700 kilometres (430 mi) of railway track in the mining areas of the southeast DRC. The project was funded by the World Bank and the DRC government. An agreement on minerals-for-infrastructure signed with China in 2009 would cover $200 million of the cost.

The U.S. Securities and Exchange Commission (SEC) was asked in July 2010 to develop guidelines under the Dodd-Frank Act over dealing in minerals from the DRC. The purpose was to ensure that the money from mineral sales was not being used to fund armed groups. In July 2011, a month before the rules were due to come into effect, Kabwelulu wrote to the SEC asking them to prevent the rules from becoming a "de facto embargo". He urged the SEC to follow United Nations and OECD recommendations that "define due diligence as a continuous process, proactive and reactive, by which companies take reasonable measures in good faith to identify and respond to risks that contribute to conflict".

In May 2010 the DRC Supreme Court decided that the Canadian firm First Quantum Minerals had illegally obtained the rights to its Frontier and Lonshi mines, previously owned by Sodimico. In August 2011 it was reported that Sodimico had sold its 30% share in the two mines for $30 million. The estimated value of the mines was over $1.6 billion. When contacted later that month, Kabwelulu at first denied that any sale had been carried out. The Sodimico CEO Laurent Lambert Tshisola Kangoa refused to discuss the matter with reporters from Reuters. The next day it was reported that Kabwelulu had in fact ordered the sale of Sodimico's 30% stake in the Frontier and Lonshi mines to Fortune Ahead, a shell company registered in Hong Kong that already owned the other 70% of Sodifor, the holding company for the properties. Sodimico was transferring some of the proceeds to a fund to be used in the forthcoming elections.

== See also ==
- Joseph Kabila
- Mining industry in the Democratic Republic of the Congo
- Gécamines
