= Royal Gold =

American mining company

Royal Gold, Inc.
- Type: Public
- Traded as: Nasdaq: RGLD; S&P 400 Component
- ISIN: US7802871084
- Industry: Mining
- Founded: 1981
- Headquarters: Denver, Colorado, USA
- Key people: William Hayes (Chairman); Bill Heissenbuttel (President and CEO)
- Products: Gold Silver Lead Copper; Molybdenum Cobalt Zinc; Potash
- Revenue: $498.82 mil'20▲17.9%
- Operating income: $198.95 mil'20▲41.4%
- Net income: $196.3 mil'20▲120.3%
- Total assets: $2.766 bil
- Total equity: $2.302 bil
- Number of employees: 27
- Website: www.royalgold.com

Royal Gold, Inc. is a precious metals stream and royalty company headquartered in Denver, Colorado. The company was founded in 1981 as Royal Resources Corporation, an oil and gas company, and adopted the Royal Gold name in 1986.

== History ==
In the 1980s, the company was named Royal Resources, Inc., and was an oil-exploration company. In 1986, H. Stanley Dempsey, a board member of the public company, transformed the company into a gold mining company and renamed the company Royal Gold, Inc. Dempsey served as Royal Gold's chief executive officer through 2006, as its executive chairman through 2008, and its non-executive chairman through 2014. Dempsey was inducted into the National Mining Hall of Fame in 2016.

In February 2010, Royal Gold completed its acquisition of International Royalty Corporation (IRC), whose interests included royalties on the Pascua-Lama project and the Voisey's Bay mine, in a cash and share transaction valued at approximately US$700 million. Royal Gold's offer followed an unsolicited all-cash bid of C$6.75 per share for IRC from Franco-Nevada.

As of June 30, 2020, the company held stream interests on six producing properties and royalty interests on 35 producing properties.

=== Acquisitions ===
During its 2007 fiscal year (ended June 30, 2007), the company acquired a 2.0% net smelter return royalty on the Peñasquito project, which was then being developed by Goldcorp.

In July 2022, Royal Gold agreed to acquire Great Bear Royalties for about C$200 million (US$153 million) in cash. The acquisition was completed in September 2022.

In October 2025, Royal Gold completed the acquisitions of Sandstorm Gold, in an all-share transaction valued at about US$3.5 billion, and Horizon Copper, for about US$196 million in cash.
