= Nolan Watson =

Canadian businessman (born 1979)

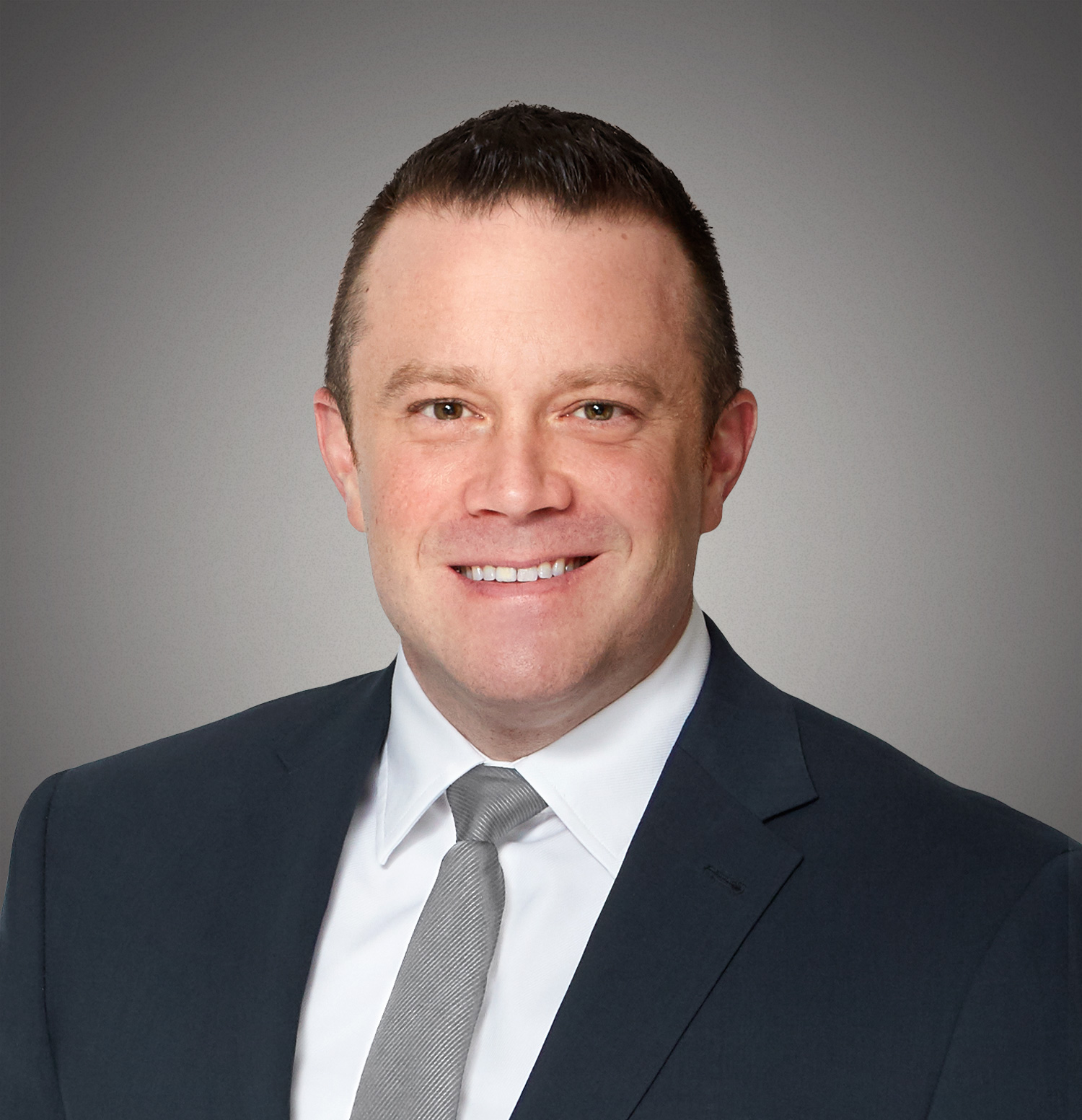
- Born: August 1, 1979 (age 47); Surrey, British Columbia, Canada
- Education: University of British Columbia
- Occupations: Businessman, humanitarian, investor, philanthropist, accountant
- Title: President and CEO – Sandstorm Gold, Sandstorm Metals & Energy; President—Nations Cry; Chairman—Blue Dot Carbon Corp
- Spouse: Dana Watson
- Children: Averie, Eliana, Kathie

Nolan Watson (born August 1, 1979) is a Canadian businessman, humanitarian, investor, and philanthropist. He is known for his contribution to finance innovation in the mining industry. Watson began working in mine finance with Silver Wheaton Corp., where he was named the chief financial officer in 2006 and was the youngest CFO (age 26) of a New York Stock Exchange listed company. Watson helped develop the silver streaming business model and raise over $1 billion in debt and equity to fund Silver Wheaton's growth into the largest streaming company in the world.

In 2008, Watson co-founded Sandstorm Resources Ltd. (now Sandstorm Gold Ltd.) and has sat as a member of the board of directors of Gold Wheaton Corp., Bear Creek Mining Corp. and True Gold Mining Inc. In addition to his work in the mining sector, Watson founded a Canadian Charitable organization called Nations Cry, providing education to children in Sierra Leone, Africa.

== Early years ==
Nolan Watson was born in Surrey, British Columbia, Canada, where he grew up with his brother Andrew and his parents, Stuart and Linda. He attended Crescent Park Elementary School, later moving on to White Rock Christian Academy for secondary school, where he was the valedictorian of his graduating class.

== Career ==
Upon graduating with a Bachelor of Commerce degree (with honors) from the University of British Columbia in 2001, Watson enrolled in the Institute of Chartered Accountants and began articling with the professional services firm Deloitte and Touche. Watson was awarded the "BC Gold Medal" on the final CA examination, scoring the highest mark in Western Canada and becoming the Valedictorian of in the Institute of Chartered Accountants of British Columbia. He went on to complete the Chartered Financial Analyst designation through the CFA Institute, and was later recognized as one of the "Most Motivated" CFA charterholders by CFA magazine. Although Watson's area of focus during his time at Deloitte was mining and metals, he had not considered a career in the industry until he was given the opportunity to join Silver Wheaton alongside Ian Telfer, the highly regarded mining entrepreneur. Telfer's new venture aimed to create the first ever ‘metal streaming company' by completing Volumetric Production Payment transactions. At 25 years of age, Watson became the Controller of Silver Wheaton and a short time later by the age of 26, was named Chief Financial Officer making him the youngest CFO of a multi-billion dollar market capitalization company listed on the New York Stock Exchange. In his four-year tenure with Silver Wheaton, Watson helped raise over US$1 billion in debt and equity to fund the organization's growth to a multi-billion market capitalization.

With his experience at Silver Wheaton behind him, Watson decided to embark on a new venture with business partner David Awram, and created Sandstorm Resources, (afterwards Sandstorm Gold), a metal streaming company focused on gold purchase agreements.

In 2022, Nolan co-founded and became chairman of Blue Dot Carbon Corp, a carbon credit streaming company that provides financing to project developers of carbon reduction projects.

Nolan is a board member of the World Gold Council.

== Awards and recognition ==
Watson was recognized as one of Canada's Top 40 Under 40 presented by Caldwell in 2010. The following year, in 2011, Nolan was recognized as one of the Top 40 Under 40 by the Globe and Mail.

In June 2012, Nolan received a Queen Elizabeth Diamond Jubilee medal as well as the recipient of the CEO of the Year Award by Business in Vancouver.

In 2014, Nolan was one of seven Canadians admitted to the Young Global Leader program by the World Economic Forum.

In 2017, Watson was the recipient of the Ernst & Young Entrepreneur of the Year Award for the Investing category.

== Philanthropy ==
In 2005 he founded Nations Cry, a Canadian charitable organization providing education to underprivileged children in Africa. Nations Cry is a volunteer based organization with a financial structure such that 100% of all donations go directly to the end cause. Watson's vision has led Nations Cry to Sierra Leone, a country that was marred by more than a decade of civil war ending in 2001. Nations Cry has completed two school building projects in Sierra Leone.

In February 2012, Watson gave a presentation at TEDxVancouver entitled, “Compassion Kills” arguing that more charities should focus on long-term sustainable solutions rather than meeting immediate needs.
