= Mining in Mauritania =

Mauritania's mineral sector was dominated by iron ore mining and beneficiation. Other mineral commodities produced in the country included cement, copper, gold, gypsum, petroleum, salt, and steel. The 'Ministère des Mines et de l’Industrie' was the Government agency responsible for enacting the Mining Code and for the coordination of all activities in the mining sector. The 'Direction des Mines et de la Géologie' was the entity responsible for promoting the mineral sector and for providing geologic and mining information to potential investors; the 'Direction des Hydrocarbures' was in charge of the development of the petroleum sector; and the 'Office Mauritanien des Recherches Géologiques' was the Government entity responsible for evaluating areas of mineral potential for exploration. The 'Société Nationale Industrielle et Minière (SNIM)' was responsible for iron ore production and beneficiation.

In 2007, the total value of exports from Mauritania was estimated to be about $1.5 billion. Excluding fish exports, which amounted to $254 million, all the main export categories were either mining or hydrocarbon products. Iron ore exports, which were valued at $575 million, represented about 38% of the country’s total exports; crude oil exports were valued at $339 million and accounted for 23%; copper exports were valued at $184 million and accounted for about 13%; and gold exports were valued at $59 million and accounted for 4% of total exports.

All mineral commodity production increased during the year, with the exception of crude petroleum, which decreased by about 51% to 5,487,000 barrels (872,400 m^{3}) compared with 11,168,000 barrels (1,775,600 m^{3}) in 2006. Cement production increased by 14.6% to 409,513 metric tons (t) compared with a revised 357,239 t in 2006. Gypsum production increased by 8.9%; iron ore production, by 6.8%; salt production, by about 35.5%; and crude steel production, by about 4.2%. The sharp increase in copper and gold production was owing to the opening of the Guelb Mohgrein Mine in late 2006.

Mining, which was one of the country’s most important sectors to the national economy, contributed about 12% of the gross domestic product (GDP) and represented more than one-half of the country’s export earnings in 2005. According to the Ministère des Mines et de l’industrie (MMi), the development, diversification, and promotion of the mining sector have become the government’s priority in recent years. The number of foreign companies applying for prospecting licenses was increasing, and projects were at various stages, ranging from grassroots exploration to mine development.

== Structure of the Mineral Industry ==
The MMi was the government agency responsible for enacting the Mining Code and for the coordination of all activities in the mining sector. La Direction des Mines et de la Géologie was the entity responsible for promoting the mineral sector and for providing geologic and mining information to potential investors. La Direction des Hydrocarbures was in charge of the development of the petroleum sector. The Mauritanian Office of Geological Research was the government entity responsible for evaluating areas of mineral potential for exploration. La Société Nationale Industrielle et Minière (SNIM) was responsible for iron ore production and beneficiation. The company operated a mining center at the northern town of Zouerate, three open pit iron ore mines at Guelb el Rhein, Kedia d’Idjill, and M’Haoudat in northern Mauritania, port facilities at Nouadhibou on the Atlantic coast, and a railway that linked the mining center to the port facilities.

== Commodities ==
=== Copper ===
First Quantum Minerals Ltd. of Canada produced its first copper in concentrate from the Guelb Moghrein copper-gold mine in July 2006; commercial production began in October 2006. The guelb Moghrein Mine is located in the inchiri region near the town of akjoujt about 250 kilometers (km) northeast of Nouakchott. The mine was expected to reach its designed capacity of 30,000 metric tons per year (t/yr) of copper concentrate by the first half of 2007. Measured and indicated resources at guelb Moghrein were reported to be 23.7 Mt. First Quantum held an 80% interest in the mine, and guelb Moghrein Mines d’akjoujt S.a. held the remaining 20%.

=== Gold ===
First Quantum produced its first gold, which amounted to 322 kg, from the Guelb Moghrein copper-gold mine in July 2006. The designed capacity of the mine was about 2,200 kilograms per year (kg/yr) of gold (reported as 70,000 troy ounces per year). Canada-based Rio Narcea Gold Mines Ltd. continued to work on the development of the Tasiast gold mine. Construction work, which was ongoing throughout 2006, was expected to be completed by the first half of 2007, with first production scheduled to begin shortly thereafter. In October, the company announced a revised mineral resource estimate of about 12 Mt at a grade of 2.7 grams per metric ton (g/t) gold compared with a previous resource estimate of about 8.9 Mt at a grade of 3.08 g/t gold. The mine was expected to produce about 3,300 kg/yr (reported as 105,000 troy ounces per year) during a period of 8 years. Projected capital expenditures for tasiast were $73 million.

=== Iron ore ===
A three-stage bankable feasibility study for the development of the Guelb El Aouj iron ore project was underway during the year. Perth-based Sphere investments Ltd. of Australia (SiL) was to fund the first $11 million to earn a 50% interest in the project, which consisted of a 17-million-metric-ton-per-year (Mt/yr) iron ore open pit mine, and a 7-Mt/yr beneficiation and direct-reduced-iron (dri) pelletizing plant. A resource definition drilling campaign for the project, which was completed in 2006, outlined a new resource estimate yielding measured, indicated, and inferred resources of high-quality magnetite-quartzite of about 701 Mt compared with the 450 Mt previously reported by the company. SiL expected to complete the bankable feasibility study by the second quarter of 2007, to begin construction work by 2008, and to produce the first DRI pellets by the second half of 2010. the life of the mine was projected to be 30 years.

During the second quarter of 2006, Saudi Basic industries Corp. Through its wholly owned subsidiary Saudi iron and Steel Company (Hadeed), and Qatar Steel Company (QaSCO) invested about $22 million in SiL as part of a new strategic iron ore partnership under which Hadeed and QaSCO were to secure a source of high-grade dri pellets as feed for their respective steel plants. in addition to working on the guelb el aouj project, SiL completed a reconnaissance diamond-drilling program for the tintekrate Bou derga deposits, which are located in the southern part of the area that makes up guelb el aouj. the envisioned mine will make use of SniM’s existing iron ore railway and port infrastructure.

=== Petroleum ===
Mauritania began producing its first petroleum from the Chinguetti oilfield in February 2006. the Chinguetti oilfield was owned by a consortium of companies that included Bg group plc, Hardman resources Ltd., Premier Oil plc, roc Oil Ltd., government-owned Société Mauritanienne de Hydrocarbures, and Woodside Petroleum Ltd. Petroleum production from the Chinguetti field was expected to average 75,000 barrels per day (11,900 m^{3}/d). the first 1,000,000 barrels (160,000 m^{3}) produced were shipped to international united Petroleum & Chemicals Co. Ltd. of the People's Republic of China, which was the trading arm of China Petroleum and Chemical Corp. Petroleum reserves at Chinguetti were estimated to be 120,000,000 barrels (19,000,000 m^{3}). Companies exploring for petroleum in the country during 2006 included Baraka Petroleum Ltd. of Australia in a joint venture with CnPC international Ltd. of China, which planned to drill the Heron-1 well, and dana Petroleum plc of the United Kingdom, which on December 5 announced the discovery of petroleum at its offshore aigrette-1 exploration well in Block 7.

=== Uranium ===
At least two companies were exploring for uranium during the year. Perth-based Murchison united nL was granted five uranium exploration licenses covering an area of 6,766 square kilometers (km2) in Bin en nar and in Bir Moghrein and was awaiting approval of three other uranium exploration licenses by the government. the company conducted ground reconnaissance work to perform detailed radiometric studies on five anomalies. The results of these studies were yet to be analyzed as of year end. On November 8, 2006, Alba Mineral Resources plc (Alba) of the United Kingdom acquired a 50% interest in Mauritania ventures Limited (MvL). MvL held two uranium exploration licenses in northern Mauritania. Alba applied for a third exploration license in the northern part of the country and for gold and base-metal exploration licenses covering an area of about 6,000 km2 located near the uranium exploration properties. Alba also applied for an additional five copper-gold-iron oxide permits in the southern part of the country.

== Mines ==
- Reguibat mine (Uranium)
