= Mineral industry of Panama =

The mineral-mining industry of Panama accounted for about 1% of the country's GDP in 2006. This does not include any manufacturing of mineral commodities, such as cement or petroleum refinery products.

== Production and exploration ==
The province of Veraguas since the Spanish colonization era in the 16th century, has been highly attractive to miners. Several mining operations were carried out in the province during this time for gold. The Remance gold mine in Veraguas was in operation as early as 1897 exporting gold to England.

Ever since the 1960s, there has been a gradual push by several panamanian governments usually in succession, to introduce mining and extractive industries to Panama and position them as the main drivers of economic growth and activity in the country, particularly in the country's interior and transitioning Panama away from a transit-based economy or economic model (transitismo in Spanish) which is based on the Panama Canal and Panama's key location in the Americas, into an extractivist economy which would allow the government to take on more debt and prevent tax reforms which could be avoided with a larger GDP number provided by mining. This push has also been driven by a perceived lack of alternative revenue and economic growth sources which are seen as specially lacking outside the surroundings of the Panama Canal. This extractivist economy or economic model includes not only the mine but also other activities of the primary sector of the economy such as agriculture.

Three mines in Panama have been abandoned and closed improperly: Remance in 1998, Santa Rosa/Cañazas in 1999 operated by Greenstone Resources, and Petaquilla Gold/Molejón, causing distrust among many panamanians towards the mining sector. Remance opened in 1990, used a gold cyanidation process and was the subject of a study by the Technological University of Panama which determined that the site was heavily polluted and posed a risk to human health including the risk of causing cancer due to increased levels of arsenic. Additionally the site has cyanide levels in its soil that surpass those in the literature. Petaquilla Gold, located near the Cobre Panama mine, was abandoned in 2014 and employed a gold cyanidation process with unused cyanide powder containers still on the site and with unprotected tanks used to dilute the cyanide being exposed to the elements, full of rainwater and leaking. Santa Rosa opened in 1995 used a gold cyanidation process and was abandoned due to economic problems caused by a fall in gold prices in the late 90s and also by heavy rainfall which caused a tailings dam containing cyanide, used for the gold cyanidation process, to collapse which caused an environmental disaster, killing fish in a 10 kilometer radius from the mine site. Remance was closed due to a fall in gold prices in 1999. Mining in Panama has been criticized due to perceived unequal distribution of wealth from mines in addition to its potential environmental effects.

Cobre Panamá is the largest open-pit copper mine in Central America. The exploration process for the mine was started during the presidency of Guillermo Endara, who assumed office on 20 December 1989 as the first elected president of Panama since Arnulfo Arias in 1968. The original mining contract was given to Petaquilla Gold, S.A. through the Law 9, approved on 26 February 1997 by the National Assembly during the presidency of Ernesto Pérez Balladares.

The only metallic mine operating in Panama as of 2009 is Petaquilla Minerals Molejon epithermal gold deposit on the Ley 9, 1997 property in Panama in Colón Province. The mine has the capacity to produce 100,000 oz/yr. The Cobre Panama (ex Petaquilla) copper project is run by Minera Panama S.A. and owned by First Quantum and is under study to produce approximately 270,000 tpy of copper. It started operation in 2009.

Minera Petaquilla S.A. was a joint venture between Petaquilla Minerals Ltd. of Canada (52%) and Inmet Mining Corp., also of Canada (48%). Minera Petaquilla was formed in 1997 to explore and develop the Cerro Petaquilla copper-gold porphyry deposit and other metallic mineral deposits within the Ley Petaquilla property, which is a large concession area that extends south from the Caribbean coast approximately 100 kilometers west of the Panama Canal. Teck Cominco Ltd. of Canada had an option contract to earn a 50% ownership share in Petaquilla Minerals (26% share in Minera Petaquilla) if it continued to fund all Petaquilla Minerals' share (52%) of the exploration and development costs of the Cerro Petaquilla copper project; Inmet was expected to fund the other 48% of total expenditures in the project. By the end of 2006, however, Inmet and Petaquilla Minerals continued to agree to extend Teck Cominco's option until production is achieved or until all three companies agree to terminate the project, and almost no investment was made in the copper project during the year. The new deadline for a commitment by Teck Cominco was set to expire on March 30, 2008. The Petaquilla mine polluted nearby rivers and caused numerous environmental issues.

Global Energy Development PLC (Harken Energy Corp. of Southlake, Texas, 34%, and other private shareholders, 66%) of the United Kingdom was still negotiating exploration contracts with the Ministry of Commerce and Industry of the Republic of Panama through the end of 2006.

Petaquilla Minerals acquired 100% ownership of the Molejon epithermal gold deposit on the Ley Petaquilla property in Panama, where the company focused almost all its investment during the year through its new gold-properties subsidiary, Petaquilla Gold S.A. Inmet and Teck Cominco retained only royalty rights (at rates to be determined) on any eventual production from gold deposits located within the Ley Petaquilla property. By sometime in 2008, Petaquilla Minerals expected to achieve the company's first production of gold at Molejon. Petaquilla faced liabilities that were not reported to investors, that caused Inmet and Teck-Cominco to pull out of the project.

Production of aggregate mineral materials, cement, and other construction materials was expected to have increased in 2006 compared with that of 2005. This was mainly because of public approval on October 22, 2006, for expansion of the Panama Canal to start sometime during the second half of 2007. This construction project was expected to be large enough that mineral companies in the construction materials sector in Panama, other countries of Central America, and in nearby Colombia would be ramping up production and securing contracts with the Panama Canal Authority to supply mineral-based materials for the canal expansion.

The very large Cerro Colorado project is owned by the government via CODEMIN, created under the rule of Omar Torrijos Herrera. In the 1970s, Rio Tinto Zinc attempted to start mining operations on the site owned by CODEMIN, but couldn't agree to terms with the panamanian government and left. CODEMIN was founded to exploit the cerro colorado site and numerous exploration campaigns were carried out on the site amid intense opposition from local indigenous people known as the Ngabe-Bugles. CODEMIN was dissolved in 2012. Other exploration targets are Cerro Quema (gold) and Cerro Chorcha (copper)..

With Cobre Panama, Cerro Colorado and Cerro Chorcha, Panama has one of the highest concentrations of copper per unit area in the world. The presidency of Ricardo Martinelli made efforts to promote mining in the country. One of these efforts removed the restriction on foreign state owned miners in Panama.

First Quantum's 2022 income from the Cobre Panama mine was 2959 million US dollars, making it the company's largest and most productive mine and accounting for almost half of its income. According to a non public study by Indesa, the mine paid 443 million dollars in salaries annually, and gave 200 million annually to Panama's social security program, enough for one month of its operation. These measurements were made before Law 406 was enacted in October 2023 which proposed a minimum $375 million dollar payment in royalties to the government annually depending on the mine's income. Additionally according to the Supreme court of Panama in its unconstitutionality ruling of Law 406 negotiated with First Quantum, it doesn't necessarily guarantee ample economic benefits for the panamanian state. The mine accounted for 2514 million dollars or 4.5% of Panama's GDP, close to the mine's income in 2022. The mine's top export destinations and main customers were located in China and Japan. The mine had no significant Panamanian or Latin American customers so almost all of the mine's production was exported. During visits to villages near the mine, there was an atmosphere of rejection against the mine. There are others who have benefited from it by establishing supply companies for the mine.

Iron as mineral underwater black sands were mined off the coast of West Panama and Cocle in 1970 and 1971, carried out by Sumitomo in a Joint Venture with local miner Minera Chame. Electromagnets were used to pick up the sand, and 75 thousand tons were exported to Japan for processing. The ore was iron rich, with up to 71 percent iron. However, on the 4th shipment, strong waved crashed the ship into the loading dock, damaging the dock, and mining was abandoned because the damages on the dock were deemed too expensive to repair.

== International agreements ==
Panama is part of the San José Pact, which allows the country to receive crude petroleum under preferential terms and pricing from Mexico and Venezuela. Venezuela also provides additional shipments of crude petroleum to Panama according to the terms of the Caracas Energy Accord. Panama is not part of CAFTATA-DR and was still negotiating a separate bilateral free trade agreement with the United States through the end of 2006.
