= Petaquilla =

Hill in Donoso, Colón, Panama

Petaquilla is a hill located in the district of Donoso, Colón Province, Panama. Petaquilla is classified as: Orographic (hill of a height less than 300 m). Petaquilla is bordered on the north by the Caribbean, south to Panamá and Coclé provinces, east with the Kuna Yala and west by the Veraguas Province.

Its geographical coordinates are 8° 59' 0" North, -80° 45' 0" West.

Since the Spanish colonial times Cerro Petaquilla became the established route by force for gold explorers and included in stories and reviews by historians, it was an area where foundries and brands were established to claim the gold that was melded for the Spanish Crown. The existence of mineral deposits in the area around Cerro Petaquilla motivated the Spanish Crown and its representatives to the development of rudimentary mining procedures in the 1600s. Today, there are modern mining operations in the area such as Petaquilla's Molejon project and the Cobre mine, Panama.
