= Reguibat mine =

Uranium mine in Mauritania

- Location: Mauritania
- Products: uranium

The Reguibat mine is a large open pit mine located in the western part of Mauritania. Reguibat represents one of the largest uranium reserves in Mauritania having estimated reserves of 69 million tonnes of ore grading 0.028% uranium.

== See also ==
- Mining in Mauritania
