= Cobre mine, Panama =

Copper mine in Panama

Cobre Panamá
- Interactive map of Cobre Panamá
- Location: Colón Province, Panama; 8°51′07.1″N 80°38′41.2″W
- Products: Copper, Gold, Silver
- Opened: 2019
- Company: First Quantum Minerals
- Website: www.cobrepanama.com
- Acquired: 2013

Cobre Panamá is an open-pit copper mine in Panama, located 120 km (75 mi) west of Panama City and 20 km (12 mi) from the Caribbean Sea coast, in the district of Donoso, in the western part of the province of Colón. The mine consists of four zones totalling 13,600 ha (34,000 acres). The main deposits are at Botija, Colina and Valle Grande. With 3.1 billion t (6.8 trillion lb) of proven and probable reserves, Cobre Panamá is one of the largest new copper mines opened globally since 2010. It is located next to the Petaquilla mine. For 2024, Cobre Panamá is made up of a copper mine, processing plant, power plant and the international port of Punta Rincón.

Commercial production started in September 2019. At full current capacity, the plant will process 85 Mtpa of ore to produce more than 300,000 t (660 million lb) of copper per year along with gold, silver and molybdenum. This is equivalent to 1.5% of global copper production as of 2023. The operation has a 34-year mine life. The three 28 megawatt SAG mills and four 16.5 megawatt ball mills installed at Cobre Panamá are the largest installed in the world up to the year 2020, except for the Sentinel mine in Zambia, also owned by First Quantum Minerals. The project is powered by a 300 MW coal fired power generation plant located at the port built for this mining operation.

== Ownership ==
As of 2017, First Quantum Minerals Ltd. (FQM) has a 90 per cent equity interest in Minera Panamá, S.A. ("MPSA"), the Panamanian company that holds the Cobre Panama concession. The remaining equity is owned by Korea Resources Corp. (KORES, 10%), which is owned by the state of Korea. Cobre Panamá is a trade name used in Panama, not the legal name, of Minera Panamá, S.A.

In November 2023, during the protests in Panama, Jiangxi Copper, a Chinese state-owned company, became the largest shareholder of First Quantum, increasing its stake in Minera Panama from 18.3% to 19.5% by purchasing 1.35 million shares.

== History ==
Since the Spanish colonial times Cerro Petaquilla became the established route by force for gold explorers and included in stories and reviews by historians, it was an area where foundries and brands were established to claim the gold that was melded for the Spanish Crown. The existence of mineral deposits in the area around Cerro Petaquilla motivated the Spanish Crown and its representatives to the development of rudimentary mining procedures in the 1600s.

Ever since the 1960s, there has been a gradual push by several Panamanian governments usually in succession, to introduce mining and extractive industries to Panama and position them as the main drivers of economic growth and activity in the country, particularly in the country's interior, transitioning Panama away from a transit-based economy (transitismo in Spanish) which is based on the Panama Canal and Panama's key location in the Americas, into an extractivist economy which would allow the government to take on more debt and prevent tax reforms which could be avoided with a higher GDP number provided by mining. This push has also been driven by a perceived lack of alternative revenue and economic growth sources which are seen as specially lacking outside the surroundings of the Panama Canal. This extractivist economy or economic model includes not only the mine but also other activities of the primary sector of the economy such as agriculture.

The initial exploration of the site, known as Cerro Petaquilla or Petaquilla, began in 1968 by a mission of the United Nations Development Programme, made in cooperation with the Panamanian government at the time. During this time it was believed that no other alternative revenue sources were available to the country. The first discovery of copper was made in 1969, and by 1970, detailed exploration and feasibility studies were underway. During the rule of Omar Torrijos Herrera, the "Alliance for Progress" was carried out with US backing, which included exploration for copper mining on the site. Mining law in the country was changed repeatedly until 1988. These exploration missions in the country continued until 1982, amid political tension in the country at the time. After the US invasion of Panama, under the first post-intervention Panamanian President, Guillermo Endara, plans to exploit the mine were continued by the granting of an exploration license, called a contract, on the mine site. He helped establish contract 27-A for exploration of the site, assigned to Geo-Recursos Internacional, headed by Richard Fifer. Fifer was well connected to several panamanian presidents. When Ernesto Pérez Balladares as president granted his company extraction rights on the mine site, he represented the government on mining affairs. During Moscoso's presidency from 1999 to 2004, he was governor of Coclé province and was a Security advisor to the government. Martin Torrijos (2004-2009) allowed him to start mine development operations and Ricardo Martinelli (2009-2014) allowed him to obtain an export license for Petaquilla Gold. Ricardo Martinelli said of Petaquilla Gold mine: "It carries out responsible mining and offers employment to at least 1,200 Panamanians" whose social security payments were not made by the company as required under Panamanian law. José Gabriel Carrizo, who would later become vice president of Panama, served as lawyer for Petaquilla Gold, of which his mother Lydia Jaén de Carrizo served as executive.

The original mining contract for mineral extraction was given to Geo-Recursos Internacional (now known as Minera Petaquilla, S.A.) through the Law 9, approved on 26 February 1997 by the National Assembly during the presidency of Ernesto Pérez Balladares. Minera Petaquilla was a joint venture between Inmet, Teck (Teck-Cominco) and Petaquilla Minerals which was organized under Canadian Law, but mostly operated in Panama. Adrian Resources was the former name of Petaquilla Minerals.

In 1997, Inmet Mining Corporation was part of the joint venture for the project. From 1998 to 2003 the project sat dormant due to low copper prices. In 2005, The Petaquilla minerals project was split into two: Petaquilla Gold and Petaquilla Copper. Petaquilla Gold would later remain under control of Petaquilla Minerals and was later sold to Petaquilla Gold, S.A., and Petaquilla Copper which initially remained part of the joint venture but later came under control of Teck and Inmet in 2008. Petaquilla copper was purchased by Inmet in 2008. To avoid losing the mining concession, work to start mining (mine development) first began in Petaquilla Gold around 2005.

The development of the copper mine began in 2011 by Inmet, and construction started in 2015. Minera Panamá, S.A. (MPSA) was established under Inmet. This copper mine project was owned by Inmet Mining until 2013, when this company was taken over by First Quantum Minerals Ltd. (FQM). Construction continued over the next six years until 2019. Cobre Panamá represents a total US$6.2 billion investment, partly financed by deposits in the amount of US$1,356 million from Franco-Nevada against future deliveries of gold and silver produced by the mine.

Juan Carlos Varela, who served as President of Panama from 2014 to 2019, extended the concession for an additional 20 years in 2016. It is reported that all presidents of Panama in the post-intervention era (starting from 1989) have been involved in expanding or supporting the operations of the copper mine, including Mireya Moscoso, Martín Torrijos and Ricardo Martinelli, all of whom served from 1999 to 2014.

Lawyer Juan Ramón Sevillano filed a claim for the unconstitutionality of Law 9 in 1998, which was done again by lawyer Susana Serracín in 2009 but it was not ruled as unconstitutional by the Supreme Court of Justice until 25 September 2018, 21 years later. The ruling was formally published in the government gazette on 2021, three years after the Supreme Court's decision due to legal measures by First Quantum's law firm Morgan & Morgan to delay its publication, even though the ruling was in effect without being published. Despite this the mine's construction continued in 2019 and the mine went into operation that same year and the governments of Juan Carlos Varela and Laurentino Cortizo made efforts to justify these actions.

By 2017, the project achieved 50% construction completion, and by 2018, the project was 80% complete.

There were plans to build a molybdenum beneficiation plant at the mine but it couldn't be built. Panama lacks legislation to oversee a mine closure process, and instead Panamanian governments have focused on making mining profitable in the country.

== Activity ==
The mine reached its first production milestone in 2019, producing its first copper concentrate. In September 2019, it achieved commercial production, and by February 2020, it reached an annualized production rate of 300,000 tonnes of copper made by processing 85 MTPA (million tons per annum, in other words millions of tons per year) of ore. The mine in 2022 was ramping up processing to 90 MTPA and had a goal of reaching 100 MTPA by the end of 2023. Construction was carried out at a cost of 10 billion US dollars and is the largest ever foreign investment by a private-sector company in Panama according to former Panamanian President Juan Carlos Varela, calling it the second most important project in the country besides the Panama Canal. First Quantum executives were ushered into the presidential palace and Philip Pascall was able to build rapport with Varela, offering Varela wine from his brother's vineyard, dining together. Varela kept a rock from the mine's first export in his personal office. The day before the mine was about to open, Varela toasted and dined with First Quantum executives. He had also personally visited the mine in 2017 and was present at the first copper export event at the mine. He personally took responsibility for the mine's operation and widely praised the operation of the mine and defended it calling the rejection in 2019 of the contract by parliament "inappropriate", asking it to reconsider the contract in order to provide "judicial security" as the mine had already started to export copper at the time.

Despite the mine's name, it also extracted and processed gold and silver from the mine's tailings which according to the company was done using a gravimetry or gravity separation process and an electric arc furnace. According to the company the gold produced by the mine was in the form of Doré bars which must be further processed for use. The bars are mostly (around 75% to 90% of the bar) made up of silver, with the remainder being gold and impurities. The mine produced 139,751 ounces of gold, and 2,813,129 ounces of silver in 2022, making it First Quantum's largest gold-producing mine.

The type of ore at the mine is likely Copper Sulfide ore, Iron oxide copper gold ore deposits, porphyry copper deposits and there are three open pits at the mine site according to observations made by environmental organization CIAM. According to the same organization during the first visit to the mine site, the news outlets in the visit did not question the handling of the mine site by the government nor First Quantum.

There have been concerns about the mine's impact on groundwater contamination and thus water supply for the Panama Canal and thus the country which uses its water as drinking water, which have been dismissed repeatedly by First Quantum, whose country manager in Panama, Keith Green, proposed sharing its water with the Panama Canal, alleging that the rivers downstream of the mine site have no users and that the mine is far away from the canal, even though the rivers near the mine site have potential to become sources of water for the Panama Canal. Due to this combined with the country's high water consumption there is concern about the mine's potentially negative impact on the competitiveness of other sectors, particularly the service sector, of the Panamanian economy which is primarily service based around the Panama Canal, a situation which could pose an existential threat to the country and the mining sector in the country is in direct competition with the agricultural sector for land and water raising concerns. The mine has mostly low grade copper ore and the terrain is rugged with heavy rainfall.

Since the mine's closure in 2023 First Quantum has engaged in a public relations outreach campaign to improve Panamanians' perception of the mine, called Cobre Conecta, which engages in several types of media. The campaign aims to highlight the claimed economic benefits of the mine, reduce what it calls disinformation, promote what it calls dialogue and scientific data, and position it as a beneficial activity for the country due to its economic activity with economic activity being Panamanians' top concern. According to First Quantum's public relations manager in Panama, Maru Galvez, this strategy has worked and the number of people against the mine has decreased and the program has as its goal the acquisition of a social license to allow the restarting of the mine.

First Quantum's 2022 income from the mine was 2959 million US dollars, making it the company's largest and most productive mine and accounting for almost half of its income. According to a non-public study by Indesa, the mine paid 443 million dollars in salaries annually, and gave 200 million annually to Panama's social security program, enough for one month of its operation. (Note: In Panama, social security retirement funds, although pooled from the population with formal jobs that contribute to social security, are only paid out to individuals based on their average salary throughout their working life.) These measurements were made before Law 406 was enacted in October 2023 which proposed a minimum $375 million dollar payment in royalties to the government annually depending on the mine's income. Additionally according to the Supreme court of Panama in its unconstitutionality ruling of Law 406 negotiated with First Quantum, it doesn't necessarily guarantee ample economic benefits for the Panamanian state. The mine accounted for 2514 million dollars or 4.5% of Panama's GDP, close to the mine's income in 2022. The mine's top export destinations and main customers were located in China and Japan. The mine had no significant Panamanian or Latin American customers so almost all of the mine's production was exported. During visits to villages near the mine, there was an atmosphere of rejection against the mine. There are others who have benefited from it by establishing supply companies for the mine. According to Panama's mining chamber and Roderick Gutiérrez, its president, over 54,000 indirect jobs were lost. This is higher than published in a non-public study by Indesa which mentioned over 40,000 jobs, which in turn is higher than the figure of 35,000 reported earlier. According to an earnings call the company had laid off 4,000 employees.

Panamanian President Mulino met with the mine's providers on February 24, 2025, after a letter was sent by them on February 10, 2025, who expressed concern over the mine's continued closure. They request that the mine be restarted to prevent bankruptcy or closure of their companies. They stated that over 70% have had to lay off personnel as a result of the mine's closure and requested that the mine be opened in 2025. Many of these companies had the mine as their main or even sole customer.

Mulino has lamented the closure of the mine, highlighting the stranded assets of many local mine suppliers and calling the situation sad and depressing. Mulino stated he will not engage in negotiations with the mine unless its arbitration proceedings are suspended. First Quantum stock rose once Mulino mentioned that "Novel ideas" were being explored for the future of the mine. Mulino is friendlier to business than his predecessor and stated he would deal with the mine once the country's social security reform is complete. He said that a lot of the economic troubles the country is going through were caused by the mine's closure.

== Concession ==
The original concession granted to Minera Panamá, S.A. ("MPSA") in February 1996 and affirmed by Panamanian contract-Law No. 9 in 1997 became questionable after a ruling of the Supreme Court in December 2017 and notified to the case's parties in September 2018, that Law 9 is in conflict with the constitution of Panama. Shortly thereafter, the Government of Panama issued a statement affirming support for Cobre Panamá and considering the MPSA mining concession as valid. On 22 December 2021, the Official Gazette, in edition No. 29439, published the unconstitutionality of Law 9. Official Gazette No. 29685-D in December 2022 published a closure order for the mine due to the unconstitutionality of Law 9, which was not enforced.

MPSA and First Quantum Minerals claim, that the ruling concerning Law 9 is not retroactive, so that the contracts signed before 2018 are not affected. During January 2022, the Government of Panama made proposals for a new contract including future payments and royalties to be imposed on MPSA. Such an agreement would have to be approved as legislation by the National Assembly.

First Quantum's subsidiary MPSA made proposals to the Government of Panamá including yearly payments of US$375 million in tax and royalty revenue. These payments were offered under the conditions that metal prices and profitability of this mine would not drop significantly. The Government of Panama announced plans to order suspension of operations at this mine after First Quantum missed a deadline for an agreement to increase its payments to the government. During the negotiation process First Quantum initiated arbitration procedures against Panama. The original contract in Law 9, alongside other contracts entered into by historic Panamian Governments, have been viewed by many analysts as too generous to businesses. After a closure of the mine during two weeks, operations resumed and the terms and conditions of a refreshed concession contract between Minera Panamá S. A. and the Government of Panama have been announced on March 8, 2023.

In October 2023, the National Assembly approved the controversial bill 1100 in its third debate, as Law 406, which has led to multiple protests in the country. These protests led to a moratorium on metallic mining throughout the country, "for an indefinite term", through law 407, excluding already approved concessions, such as Bill 1110, approved with 59 votes in favor by the National Assembly on November 3, 2023.

== Unconstitutionality of the contract and total closure of the mine ==
On November 28, in a unanimous ruling, the Plenary Session of the Supreme Court of Justice declared that Law 406 of October 20, 2023, which approves the mining concession contract entered into between the State and Sociedad Minera Panamá, S.A. was unconstitutional. Panama's President said the Minera Panamá copper mine would be closed, hours after the country's Supreme Court declared its contract unconstitutional.

The justices of the supreme court determined that the mining contract between First Quantum Minerals and the government of Panama infringed twenty-five articles of the Panamanian Constitution, including numerous articles concerning the sovereignty, the duty of preserving people's safety, the fundamental rights and the international law: articles 4, 17, 18, 19, 20, 32, 43, 46, 56, 109, 118, 119, 120, 121, 124, 159 (sections 10 and 15), 163 (section 1), 200 (section 3), 257 (section 5), 258, 259, 266, 285, 286 and 298. As the Supreme Court also upheld their 2017 ruling of the previous Law 9 that allowed the mine to operate before Law 406 was enacted, and reported that First Quantum Minerals illegally exploited the mine for the span between 2021 and 2023, María Eugenia López (chief justice of the Supreme Court) said during the public announcement of the ruling that the mining contract would be removed from the Panamanian regulatory system; therefore, the government of Panama must ensure the orderly and safe shutting down of the operation of First Quantum Minerals in Panamanian territory. Official Gazette No. 29685-D in December 2022 published a closure order for the mine due to the unconstitutionality of Law 9, which was not enforced. The ruling was published in the government gazette four days later, on 2 December 2023, effectively ending the protests in the country.

According to the unconstitutionality ruling, law 406 allowed the mine to operate without a legally binding, comprehensive, proactive environmental protection program, and instead law 406 allowed the mine to operate with only reactive or passive, legally binding, mitigation measures to any environmental issues that arose. The ruling deemed the mining operation to be a threat to the right to life and health due to its location in the Mesoamerican Biological Corridor. Additionally the Environmental and Social Impact Assessment (ESIA) which is mandated by the government for a vast array of projects was severely out of date as it was carried out in 2011. The Guardian reported that there has been an increase in kidney disease in areas near the mine site since after mine development began, in 2014; in addition local villagers have had their mobility in the area reduced requiring badges and some environmentalists have also suggested that some digestive tract problems in the area should be analyzed to determine if they are connected to the mine's former operations. According to local media, at least three then-ministers of state held ties with the mine.

After law 406 was ruled unconstitutional, Minera Panamá, argued that it did not invalidate the mining agreement, but no such agreement was found by Panama's comptroller general. Following Panama's 2024 general election, the mining company expressed its anticipation of engaging in dialogue with the new government. In its latest statement, the company noted, "We look forward to a dialogue with a new government and working together once it takes office to find a resolution that is in Panama's best interest."

Royal Bank of Canada analyst Sam Crittenden commented on José Raúl Mulino's victory, stating that it is a positive development for First Quantum. However, he also emphasized the existing uncertainty surrounding the Cobre Panama project and the need to improve public perception of mining. Crittenden highlighted that negotiations with the new government are necessary before any potential reopening of the project.

On April 24, 2025, Mulino stated the mine would be exploited (reopened) without a contract and opting for the framework of an association, in order to bypass the National Assembly who he said is unwilling to approve such a contract.

A report published in 2026 by Panamanian newspaper La Prensa argues entities with relationships to First Quantum Minerals, majority owner of the Cobre mine, Panama, have engaged in coordinated astroturfing-like campaigns in order to shift public opinion in favor of restarting mining activities, against popular public opinion. This involves fake personal social media profiles posting in favor of restarting mining activities, paying influencers and news outlets to align with the marketing campaign of the mining company as an apparent ideological stance without disclosure, and conventional disclosed advertising and outreach campaigns offering promotional items such as bags. When the company's local PR manager was confronted about it, she deflected the questions and defended their intent. It has also been used to attempt to shift public opinion by posing mining as an ideological stance and thus supporting mining activities by directly or indirectly making relationships between mining and societal issues, even over months, across posts, sometimes mentioning only mining or societal issues in separate posts, and posing a single mine as mining and thus its restart as an ideological or political stance.

Reuters reported the panamanian government would create a state owned miner, with First Quantum holding 60 percent of shares, to restart the mine. First Quantum would be given a higher stake due to their investments in the mine. Lawers saw this framework as legally viable, however the government fears public backlash. Mining is still seen as unacceptable by over 60% of the population.

On June 19, 2026, the final results of the audit were published, with First Quantum achieving an overall score of 88%, meeting or exceeding compliance on 361 out of 370 total commitments. This audit was rejected by environmental organizations, because in over 40 percent of items declared compliant, compliance was decided purely on whether First Quantum presented documentation.

Internally the company has attributed opposition to the mining operation as a PR problem. The company has invested heavily into organizing events, renting stands in events, sponsoring events, and launching promotional campaigns via all forms of advertising such as print, outdoor, social media, newspaper inserts, Radio and TV as well as outreach in shopping malls via flyers and stands and in visits to elementary and high schools, as well as astroturfing and investing heavily in these similarly to an election campaign. The company has offered to issue sponsored news under the condition of not marking them as sponsored in both social media accounts and print and Several high ranking government officials with close ties to president Mulino hold stakes in the mine or mine-related businesses. Former president Cortizo announced the mine would be closed, but president Mulino claimed he was not able to say goodbye to it and announced the mine would be reopened, stating it belongs to Panama. Locals are not able to use nearby rivers and the mining company states that negative statements in regards to it are myths, not data nor factual. It has organized health fairs and has been found to dump heavy metals and tailings into nearby rivers. The exact amount of money paid by the mine to the Panamanian government is deemed secret during Mulino's presidency The land where the mine was built was provided by two lawers of the morgan and morgan law firm which has as client first quantum minerals, making 8 million dollars in profit, using a system intended for farmers to acquire land which was used to purchase the land for 71 thousand dollars. A movement to curb mining in Panama was started, called Panama Vale Mas Sin Mineria.

The mine has started shipping since 2025, processed copper concentrate to pay for the mine's preservation plan. The concentrate was destined for Aurubis AG, in Germany.
