= Precious metals streaming =

Mining business agreement

Precious metals streaming is a term for when a company makes an agreement with a mining company to purchase all or part of their precious metals production at a predetermined discounted price to which both parties agree. In return, streaming companies provide upfront financing for mining companies looking for capital. The precious metals defined by the agreement are usually a by-product of what the mining company's business is based on, typically base metals such as copper. The first known example of precious metals streaming was in 1987, relating to gold at the Goldstrike mine.

Wheaton Precious Metals, Franco-Nevada, Royal Gold, OR Royalties and Sandstorm Gold are the largest precious metals streaming companies. These streaming companies have no control over the mines that produce these materials, meaning that when production falls short of expectations or is affected by political instability, the streaming companies must incur the losses themselves. On the other hand, their investment is limited and the operation of a mine as well as its cost are the responsibility of the corresponding mining company. Earnings of the streaming companies are based on the market price of the minerals.
