= Paul C. Henshaw =

American businessman and geologist

Paul C. Henshaw (1913–1986) was an American businessman and geologist. He was president of Homestake Mining Company from 1970 to 1977.

== Early life ==
Henshaw was born in Rye, New York, in 1913. He graduated from Harvard University before receiving an MS and PhD in geology from the California Institute of Technology.

== Career ==
Henshaw worked in Peru and Mexico, along with teaching as an associate professor at the University of Idaho.

In 1953, he started working at Homestake Mining Company. In 1961, Henshaw became vice-president of Homestake Mining Company.

In 1968, Henshaw was appointed to the California State Mining and Geology Board by Ronald Reagan.

In 1970, Henshaw became president of Homestake Mining Company. He led the company as president until 1977, when he became chairman of the board. He was on the frontline of mine exploration and development. During his tenure the company became an established provider of uranium and expanded to include lead and zinc in Missouri as well as silver in Colorado. His excellent leadership led Homestake to place among the top financial performers among U. S. companies throughout the 1970s.

In 1981, Henshaw was awarded the Charles F. Rand Memorial Gold Medal by the American Institute of Mining, Metallurgical, and Petroleum Engineers for "his unique combination of skills in innovating mining exploration, development, technology, and financial management, while serving fully his professional and civic responsibilities."

Henshaw retired from Homestake in 1983.

== Death ==
Henshaw died on August 12, 1986, at 72 years old.
