= Sodimico =

- Company type: State-owned enterprise
- Industry: Mining industry
- Predecessor: Union Miniere du Katanga
- Founded: 1967; 58 years ago
- Founder: President Mobotu
- Fate: Unknown
- Headquarters: Democratic Republic of the Congo (DRC)
- Area served: DRC
- Key people: Laurent Lambert Tshisola Kangoa, CEO
- Products: Gold, copper, cobalt and other metals
- Owner: Government of the Democratic Republic of the Congo

Sodimico (Société de développement industriel et minier du Congo) is a Congolese state-owned mining company in the Democratic Republic of the Congo (DRC).

In 2022 the DRC General Inspectorate of Finance blamed the government for putting the company into bankruptcy through mismanagement and corruption.

== Early years ==
Sodimico took over several mining properties from the Union Miniere du Katanga in 1967, when President Mobotu partially nationalized the Zaire economy. Sodimico was a subsidiary of the giant state-owned Gécamines. The primary focus was on gold mining. In 1988 the Kinsenda mine was flooded, halting production for two years.

During the 1990s the company was badly affected by civil conflict and by the government's privatization policies. In many cases workers went unpaid for months. During the Second Congo War (1998–2003) and in the unrest that followed "peace", informal mining by artisans produced much of the copper and cobalt, exporting it illegally with the collusion of government officials. Private companies produced 85% of official output, with dysfunctional state companies such as Sodimico or Gécamines as passive minority partners.

== Joint ventures ==
As of February 2007, Sodimico held 20% of Minière de Musoshi et Kinsenda (MMK), other shareholders being Copper Resources Corp (CRC) with 75% and Forrest Group with 5%. MMK was dewatering the Kinsenda Mine, which had one of the world's highest grades of copper ore at 5.1%. It was estimated that the mine would produce 1.2 million tons of ore per year, giving 56,000 tons of copper.

Due to a Title Revisitation Process initiated by the DRC government, in February 2009, it was confirmed that the Musoshi Mine would be returned by the South African miner Metorex to Sodimico. In March 2011 Prime Minister Adolphe Muzito attempted to pay a visit to a Sodimico plant in the Sakania Territory. However, his route was blocked by miners protesting that they had not been paid for several years.

== Controversy ==
In May 2010 the DRC Supreme Court decided that the Canadian firm First Quantum Minerals had illegally obtained the rights to its Frontier and Lonshi mines, previously owned by Sodimico. According to First Quantum the ruling was due to FQM's decision to contest the expropriation of their Kolwezi tailings project, which was later sold to the Kazakh mining company Eurasian Natural Resources Corporation. In August 2011 it was reported that Sodimico had sold its 30% share in the two mines for $30 million. The estimated value of the mines was over $1.6 billion. A document signed on 28 March 2011 laid out the agreement between Sodimico, Sandro resources Ltd and Garetto holdings Ltd.

When contacted later that month, Mines Minister Martin Kabwelulu denied that any sale had been carried out. The Sodimico CEO Laurent Lambert Tshisola Kangoa refused to discuss the matter with reporters from Reuters. The next day it was reported that Kabwelulu had in fact ordered the sale of Sodimico's 30% stake in the Frontier and Lonshi mines to Fortune Ahead, a shell company registered in Hong Kong that already owned the other 70% of Sodifor, the holding company for the properties. Sodimico was transferring some of the proceeds to a fund to be used in the forthcoming elections. In September 2011 the International Monetary Fund asked for explanations from Sodimico and Gécamines, another state owned mining company, of sales of assets below market value and without publicity. At the time, the IMF was providing loans to the DRC worth $561 million to improve the economy.
