= Frontier mine, Katanga =

Copper mine in the Democratic Republic of the Congo

Frontier Mine
- Location within Democratic Republic of the Congo
- Location: Haut-Katanga Province, Democratic Republic of the Congo; 12°44′34″S 28°29′24″E
- Products: Copper
- Company: Eurasian Resources Group
- Website: www.frontiermine.africa

Frontier Mine (French: Mine Frontière) is a copper mine in Katanga Province, Democratic Republic of the Congo (DRC) owned and operated by ERG (Eurasian Resources Group). The resource was first mined by First Quantum Minerals. The mine has an annual capacity of 370,000 tonnes of sulfide concentrate containing 27% copper.

== Location ==
The mine is located 2 kilometres (1.2 mi) from the Zambian border, near the town of Sakania. The main railway from the Zambian Copperbelt to Lubumbashi in the DRC runs within 5 kilometres (3.1 mi) of the site. The area was explored in the 1930s, and Union Minière found copper in 1932. The area was further explored in the 1970s. Companies who have explored the region include Anglo-American and a joint venture between Sodimico and a Japanese group.

== Development ==
First Quantum obtained exploration licenses in January 2001 and July 2002. Production began in 2007, and in 2010 the mine yielded 322,700 tonnes of copper. In August 2010 the DRC government seized Frontier, the largest copper mine in the country, saying First Quantum had been "unreasonable" in refusing to renegotiate the terms of the contract. The government-owned company Sodimico was granted the titles to First Quantum's Frontier and Lonshi mines. In August 2011, Bloomberg News reported that Sodimico had sold its share in the two copper projects for $30 million. This was less than a sixteenth of the estimated value of the stake. The purchaser was not named. In response to this report, the minister of mines, Martin Kabwelulu, denied that any sale had taken place. However, Reuters soon confirmed the sale of 30% of Frontier to Fortune Ahead, which already owned the other 70% of the mine through its stake in the joint venture Sodifor. The Sodifor joint venture also owned the Lonshi Mine. Proceeds from the sale appeared to be spent on funding Joseph Kabila's political campaign in the 2011 Democratic Republic of the Congo general election.

== Re-Development and ENRC licence ==
In July 2012, ERG, known as Eurasian Natural Resources Corp Plc at the time was granted the mining licence at Frontier. Eurasian Natural Resources Corporation had previously acquired First Quantum's plant and equipment remaining at the site as part of a settlement for First Quantum DRC assets. Eurasian Natural Resources Corporation announced plans to recommence production as soon as possible.

In 2016, ENRC, (which was reorganized as Eurasian Resources Group) sold rights to 100% of the mine's copper to the CCS company in Zambia, which is owned by China Nonferrous Metal Mining Group's Foreign Engineering and Construction Co., Ltd. (NFC) and Yunnan Copper. In 2018, the ERG was attempting to sell the mine to reduce its debt burden. As of 2021, the company still runs the mine and signed a community development plan.
