= Inmet Mining =

Canadian mining company

Inmet Mining Corporation
- Industry: Mining
- Founded: 1987; 39 years ago
- Defunct: March 22, 2013; 13 years ago
- Fate: Acquired by First Quantum Minerals
- Headquarters: Toronto, Ontario, Canada
- Number of locations: Mexico, Peru, Spain, Panama, Chile and Finland
- Products: Copper, zinc, gold
- Net income: $264 million (2011)

Inmet Mining Corporation was a mining company headquartered in Toronto. In 2013, the company was acquired by First Quantum Minerals in a hostile takeover.

The company held an 18% stake in Ok Tedi Mining Limited. The company had mines in Çayeli, Turkey; Las Cruces, Spain; and Pyhäsalmi, Finland. It was also developing a mine in Cobre Panama, Panama.

== History ==
The company was founded in 1987.

In 1996, the company commissioned the Troilus mill, which began production in 1997. Homestake Mining Company agreed to acquire a majority interest in the mine in 1997 but backed out of the deal. The mine was shut in 2010.

In 2003, the company acquired a mine in Turkey from Teck Resources.

In April 2004, the company agreed to merge with Aur Resources but the transaction was called off in June 2004.

In May 2008, the company took over management of the mine in Petaquilla.

In January 2011, Lundin Mining agreed to combine with the company but in March 2011, the deal was called off after failing to win shareholder support.

In March 2013, First Quantum Minerals acquired the company for C$5.1 billion in a successful hostile takeover bid.
