= Homestake Mining Company =

American gold mining company

- Industry: Mining
- Founded: 1877; 149 years ago
- Founder: George Hearst, Lloyd Tevis, and James Ben Ali Haggin
- Defunct: December 14, 2001; 24 years ago
- Fate: Acquired by Barrick Gold

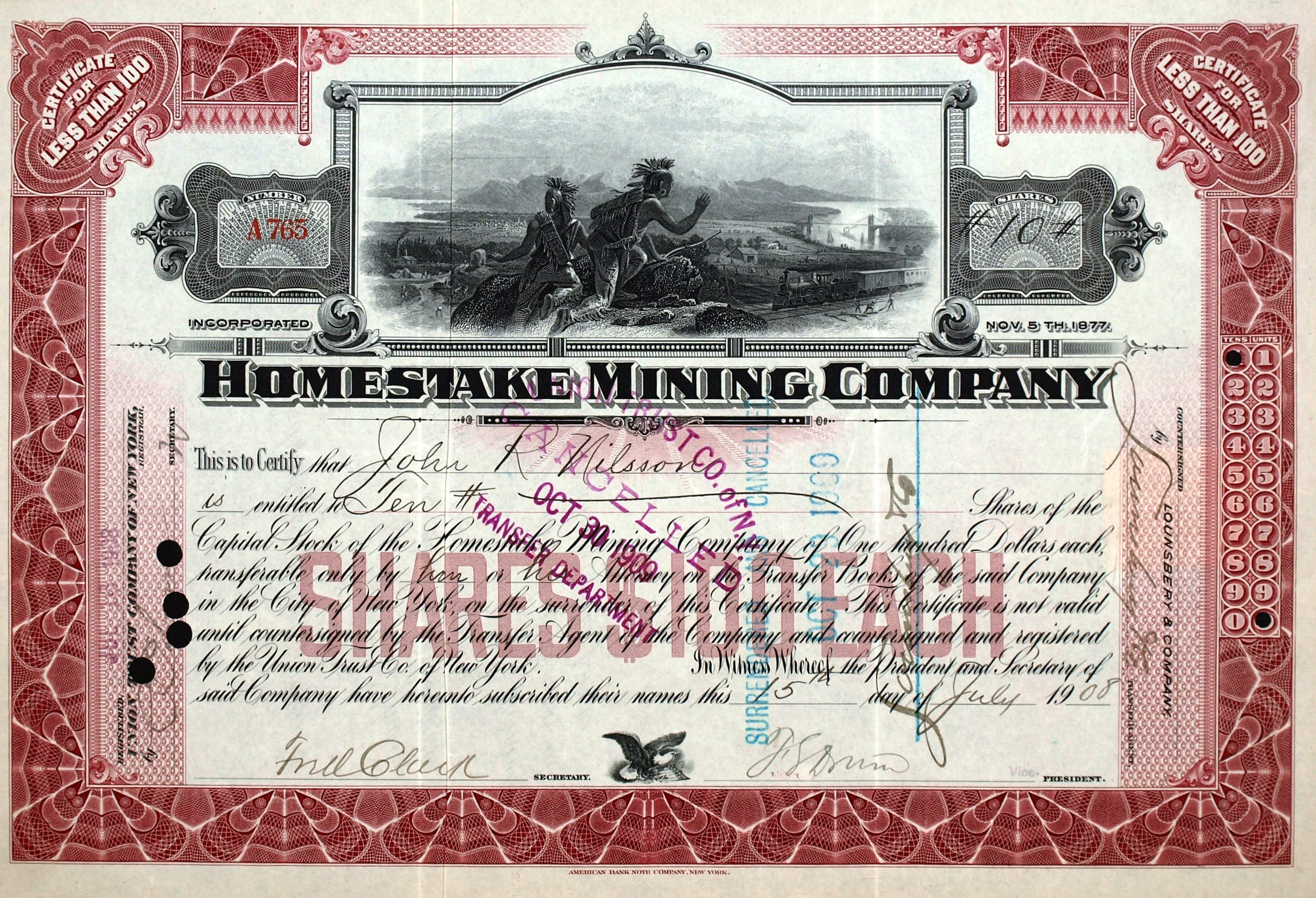
Share of the Homestake Mining Company, issued July 15, 1908

Homestake Mining Company was one of the largest gold mining businesses in the United States and the owner of the Homestake Mine in Lead, South Dakota. Founded in 1877, it was acquired by Barrick Gold in December 2001.

Homestake was the longest-listed stock in the history of the New York Stock Exchange.

== History ==
On April 9, 1876 Moses and Fred Manuel established the Homestake Mine near Bobtail Gultch in South Dakota in the Black Hills.

George Hearst (father of William Randolph Hearst), Lloyd Tevis, and his brother-in-law James Ben Ali Haggin bought the 10-acre Homestake Mine from its discoverer, Moses Manuel, for $70,000, and incorporated the Homestake Mining Company on November 5, 1877.

On January 25, 1879, the company became a public company via an initial public offering on the New York Stock Exchange, the first mining stock ever listed. It grew to be the largest gold mine in the United States.

In 1910 and 1917, the company established hydroelectricity plants. They were sold to the city of Spearfish, South Dakota in 2004.

Between 1970 and 1977, Paul C. Henshaw was President of the company.

In 1981, the company bought out its partner in its uranium joint venture, United Nuclear Corporation, for $23 million and assumed operation of four uranium mines and one mill.

In March 1996, the company exercised its option to buy 34% more of a mine in Bulgaria.

In 1997, the company agreed to acquire a majority interest in the Troilus mine from Inmet Mining but backed out of the deal, leading to a lawsuit.

In April 1998, the company acquired Plutonic Resources Limited for $640 million, adding mines in Australia.

In December 1998, the company acquired the 49.4% of Prime Resources Group that it did not already own.

In September 2000, the company announced plans to close the Homestake Mine by January 2002.

In December 2001, Barrick Gold acquired the company.
