= Lonshi Mine =

Copper mine in the Democratic Republic of the Congo

- Location within Democratic Republic of the Congo
- Location: Haut-Katanga, Democratic Republic of the Congo; 13°10′30″S 28°56′21″E
- Products: Copper

Lonshi Mine is a copper mine in Katanga Province of the Democratic Republic of the Congo, to the southeast of Ndola, Zambia.

== Operations ==
The mine produces high-grade oxide ore that was transported to Zambia for processing at the SX/EW facility in Bwana. Both the mine and the Bwana Mkubwa facility 35 kilometres (22 mi) away were owned by First Quantum Minerals (FQM). In January 2003 FQM announced an increase in estimated reserves from 295,000 tonnes to 356,000 tonnes of contained copper. In 2006 the mine produced about 520,000 tonnes of ore grading 10.3% copper, and copper cathode production was 51,068 tonnes.

== Controversy ==
In December 2007 Moise Katumbi, the governor of Katanga province, ordered First Quantum Minerals to stop exporting copper ore from the Lonshi mine to Zambia. The stoppage was related to a dispute over contract terms. In May 2010 a Congolese court ruled that FQM's Lonshi and Frontier copper mines had been awarded illegally and that they should revert to state-owned Sodimico. According to FQM the cancellation of their licenses was due to FQM's decision to contest the expropriation of their Kolwezi tailings project, which was later sold to the Kazakh mining company Eurasian Natural Resources Corporation.

FQM's share of the properties was transferred first to Sodimico, then to Sodifor, a joint venture between Sodimico and Fortune Ahead, a shell company listed in Hong Kong with Saul Valt as the sole registered director. In August 2011 the Bloomberg news agency reported that Sodimico had sold its 30% share in the Frontier and Lonshi mines for under than one sixteenth of their estimated value. The minister of Mines denied that any sale had been made.

In 2021, Eurasian Resources Group sold its interest in the Lonshi mine to the China-based JCHX Group. Although the mine has been closed since 2008, JCHX planned to put $390 million into reopening the mine.

== See also ==
- Dikulushi Mine
