= Sentinel mine =

Copper mine in North-Western, Zambia

- Interactive map of Sentinel mine
- Location: North-Western Province, Zambia; 12°15′36″S 25°18′09″E
- Products: Copper
- Production: 300,000 tons/year
- Opened: 2015
- Company: First Quantum Minerals
- Acquired: 2010

Sentinel Mine is a large copper mine located in north-west Zambia in North-Western Province, part of FQM Trident Ltd.

The mine is owned and operated by Canadian-based First Quantum Minerals, which purchased the rights to the project in 2010. Construction of a 55 million tonne per annum process plant began in June 2012, and the first product was extracted in August 2015, though full-scale production did not begin until November 2016. The mine cost about $2.3 billion to build, and employs about 6,000 people.

In 2010, First Quantum bought Kiwara plc and the prospecting license for the periphery of the Kabompo Dome, including the Kalumbila copper deposit (now Sentinel Mine) and the Kawako nickel deposit (now Enterprise Mine). The combined project is named Trident Mine and shares processing infrastructure and tailings facilities.
