= Guelb Moghrein Mine =

Copper mine in Inchiri, Mauritania

Guelb Moghrein Mine is a copper mine operated by Mauritanian Copper Mines S.A, a subsidiary of Canadian company First Quantum Minerals. It is located 4 kilometres (2.5 mi) west of Akjoujt town in the Inchiri region of Mauritania.

Commercial production began in October 2006 and the current estimated mine life is to 2027. The mine has been forced to temporarily suspend operations in 2012 and 2014 due to protests and strikes.

Mining is carried out in a single open pit using hydraulic excavators and mechanical drive haul trucks.

With the quality of the remaining copper ore diminishing, in 2026 the company announced plans to alter production methods to increase yield of gold from the ore, and to recover gold from existing tailings. Operations are planned to continue until at least 2027.
