= Net smelter return =

Measure of mining property revenue

Net Smelter Return (NSR) is the net revenue that the owner of a mining property receives from the sale of the mine's metal/non metal products less transportation and refining costs. As a royalty it refers to the fraction of net smelter return that a mine operator is obligated to pay the owner of the royalty agreement. The royalty is paid in variable or fixed payments based on sales revenue received by a mining operator in return for mining output. It is contingent only on the sales price and quantity of product sold.

The term is named so due to the fact most of the time, mining output sold requires further processing by smelters; the mining products purchased directly by smelters are sold to them for a discounted (net) price based on how much further processing is needed. The mining lease specifies the selling price (prices are different in spot and forward markets) and is used to verify the exact amount of product that's produced and sold between royalty payments.

One advantage NSR royalties have over other royalties is that usually, payments are higher in the short term because capital costs and exploration costs cannot be used as deductions (some royalties don't have to be paid until after other costs such as loans/amortization are taken care of). Also, mine life and royalty expiration dates need to be taken into consideration. The royalty can be called a Net Value Royalty when deductions are based solely on the contract.

Alternatively the Gross Smelter Return is a percentage of gross revenue paid by mine owner that isn't subject to any deductions.

== Examples of transactions involving net smelter return royalties ==
- Franco-Nevada's 7.29% NSR royalty on Newmont Mining's Gold Quarry open pit mine in Nevada, which cost the company US$103.5 million, realized $250 million in royalty payments before being acquired. The NSM royalty in this case gave Franco Nevada the option of collecting in cash or in-kind (metal product output).
