= Volumetric production payment =

Financing method common in oil and gas market

A volumetric production payment (VPP) deal is a means of financing that has been used in the oil and gas industry for several decades. A VPP involves the owner of an oil and gas property selling a percentage of their production in exchange for an upfront cash payment. Typically, smaller exploration and production companies are seen utilizing VPP agreements as it allows them to raise capital while retaining full ownership of their property and not diluting their company’s equity position.

== Mining sector ==
In 2004, mining entrepreneur Ian Telfer created Silver Wheaton which aimed to apply volumetric production payment transactions to the mining sector. The business model came to be known as metal streaming and structures VPP transactions in such a way that an upfront payment is exchanged for a percentage of metal production, with a fixed payment being made for each ounce of metal delivered. The model has proven to be wildly successful as Silver Wheaton became a multibillion-dollar company within a few years of operation. Franco Nevada Corp., Royal Gold Inc. and Sandstorm Gold Ltd. are other companies that have deployed the metal streaming business model.

In the oil and gas industry Chesapeake Energy is the most visible user of VPPs, having raised around $5 billion in operating capital since 2008 without creating debt on its books or diluting shareholders by issuing more stock. Under a VPP a bank or hedge fund actually purchases and receives title to a portion of the mineral reserves in an oil and gas lease or group of leases. This raises legal issues when the VPP seller (usually the operator of the lease(s) and subject to a joint operating agreement with its co tenants) sells and conveys a portion of the mineral reserves in place in which it owns an undivided interest and then retains for itself all of the upfront VPP cash payment without sharing it with its co tenants (other working interest owners).

VPPs are carefully structured as sales of real property interests to satisfy IRS and FASB rules and standards to defer taxable gains to the VPP seller and protect the VPP buyer in the event of the seller's bankruptcy. The mineral reserves are conveyed by the VPP seller to the VPP purchaser in legal instruments that are recorded in the counties where the mineral reserves are located.
