= Franco-Nevada =

Canadian company

Franco-Nevada Corporation
- Type: Public
- Traded as: TSX: FNV (2007); NYSE: FNV (2011); S&P/TSX 60 component
- Industry: Mining; Oil & gas
- Predecessor: Newmont Mining Corporation
- Headquarters: Toronto, Canada
- Key people: David Harquail (Chair), Paul Brink (President & CEO), Sandip Rana (CFO)
- Products: Gold Royalties and Streams
- Revenue: ▲US$1.300 billion (2021)
- Operating income: ▲US$861 million (2021)
- Net income: ▲US$734 million (2021)
- Total assets: $6.210 bil.(2021)
- Total equity: $6.025 bil. (2021)
- Website: www.franco-nevada.com

Franco-Nevada Corporation is a Toronto, Ontario, Canada-based, gold-focused royalty and streaming company with a diversified portfolio of cash-flow producing assets. It is traded on the Toronto Stock Exchange and New York Stock Exchange.

The Old Franco-Nevada was a publicly listed company on the Toronto Stock Exchange from 1983 to 2002. In 1986, Old Franco-Nevada made its first royalty acquisition, and acquired or created additional royalties and resource investments from 1986 to 2002. Following several royalty acquisitions in the 1980s and 1990s, Old Franco-Nevada sold its only mining property to Normandy Mining in exchange for 19.9% of the company's shares.

In 2002, Newmont acquired 100% of Franco-Nevada as part of a three-way combination of Newmont, Normandy and Old Franco-Nevada. Newmont maintained Franco-Nevada as a royalty holding division, transferring numerous other royalties to it over the five-year period following the acquisition, building its portfolio of royalties to include investments in almost 300 royalties (two-thirds in base and precious metal miners, and one-third in oil and natural gas) at the time.

In 2007 Newmont spun off Franco-Nevada in an initial public offering (IPO). Franco-Nevada has grown substantially since the IPO through the acquisition of existing royalties but also by acquiring precious metal streams directly from mine operators. The largest acquisitions have been by-product gold and silver streams from some of the world’s largest copper mines including Cobre Panama (Panama), Candelaria (Chile), Antapaccay (Peru) and the Antamina mine (Peru). Franco-Nevada has also continued to add to its oil and gas royalty interests, particularly in the major US oil and gas fracking basins.

== Early history ==
Franco-Nevada initially began trading as a public gold exploration company in 1983 and was led by executives Seymour Schulich and Pierre Lassonde. At the time, oil and gas royalty ownership—but not gold royalty ownership—was an established business strategy. In 1985 Franco-Nevada raised $930,000 to purchase gold royalties in a follow-on offering. The company made its first royalty investment in 1986, spending half the corporate treasury ($2 million) to acquire 4% of revenues from a mine in Nevada owned by Western States Minerals, later called Goldstrike mine. Franco-Nevada assumed that known reserves would allow the royalty to pay for itself regardless of additional exploration results. Barrick Gold Corp. acquired the Goldstrike property in 1986 and started production in 1987. The Goldstrike deposit is the largest Carlin-style deposit discovered globally and up until 2018, the mine had produced 44 Moz of gold.

In 1988 Franco-Nevada purchased a royalty on the Castle Mountain mine in California. Despite the Castle Mountain mine being unsuccessful, losing money and eventually closing, Franco-Nevada collected triple its investment of $2.8 million.

Franco-Nevada further went on to purchase royalties in various other commodities, but continued its focus on gold.

In the early 1990s, consulting geologist Ken Snyder convinced the management of Franco-Nevada to stake a play at the intersection of the Carlin and Getchell trends in Nevada, leading to the high-grade gold and silver discovery of what became the Ken Snyder Mine. Franco-Nevada concluded that the mine had a high enough silver credit to carry all operating costs, thereby creating an effective 100% gold royalty. Construction of the $84 million project was completed and first gold was produced in December 1998.

Seymour Schulich and Pierre Lassonde created a sister company to Franco-Nevada, named Euro-Nevada. Euro-Nevada had a gold-only focus while Franco-Nevada was more diversified. In June 1999, they merged Franco-Nevada and Euro-Nevada to increase liquidity and financial capacity and improve clarity for shareholders. The combined companies had a market value of $3.5 billion at the time.

== Newmont take over ==
In April 2001, Franco-Nevada sold the Nevada Midas mine (previously named the Ken Snyder mine), its only wholly owned mine, to Normandy Mining in exchange for 20% of Normandy and a five-percent royalty on the mine. That September, Anglo Gold made a bid for Normandy at a valuation 60% greater than Franco-Nevada's acquisition cost. Seeing the potential to take advantage of Newmont's rivalry with Anglo, Schulich and Lassonde approached Newmont Mining Corporation to discuss purchasing Franco-Nevada and Normandy, striking a deal richer than Anglo's offer, and ultimately valuing Franco-Nevada at $2.5 billion.

== Spin-off from Newmont ==
In 2007, Newmont made the decision to divest its portfolio of royalty assets. Pierre Lassonde, David Harquail and a small team led by management of the original Franco-Nevada, launched an initial public offering on the Toronto Stock Exchange raising CA$1.1 billion which helped fund the US$1.2 billion acquisition of a portfolio of royalties from Newmont. The listing was one of the largest in Canadian history, second only to the 2000 Sun Life IPO, and the largest mining IPO in North American History.

== Major Assets ==
=== Cobre Panama ===
In August 2012, Franco-Nevada partnered with Inmet Mining to invest $1 billion in various metal streams from the Cobre Panama Copper Project. In 2013, First Quantum Minerals took over Inmet Mining. At the end of January 2018, the subsidiary Franco-Nevada (Barbados) acquired an additional precious metals stream on Korea Resources Corporation’s interest in Cobre Panama and provided a second tranche of funding to First Quantum to assist it with acquiring a further 10% interest in the project. After this transaction, FNB has precious metal stream interests covering 100% of the ownership of Cobre Panama. FNB has funded a total of $1.356 billion funding commitment of the more than $6 billion capital cost for the project. In June 2019, Cobre Panama started shipping ore concentrate. An announcement of a Panamanian Supreme Court ruling in connection to the constitutionality of Law 9 of 1997 is raising questions concerning Minera Panama S. A.., the holder of the Cobre Panama concession. In April 2019, First Quantum indicated its plan to invest a further US$327 million to expand Cobre Panama’s throughput from 85 Mtpa to 100 Mtpa starting in 2023.

In January 2022, negotiations between the Government of Panama and First Quantum Minerals started to define a new contract concerning the Cobre Panama mine. First Quantums subsidiary Minera Panamá S. A. made proposals favorable to the Government of Panamá including yearly payments of US$375 million in tax and royalty revenue. These payments were offered under the conditions that metal prices and profitability of this mine would not drop significantly. However, the Government of Panamá halted discussions in December 2022 and announced plans to order suspension of operations at this mine. After a closure of the mine during two weeks, operations resumed and the terms and conditions of a refreshed concession contract between Minera Panamá S. A. and the Government of Panama have been announced on March 8, 2023. In October 2023, the Panamanian congress approved the controversial bill 1100 approving the refreshed concession contract in its third debate, which has led to multiple protests in the country. These protests led to a moratorium on metallic mining throughout the country, "for an indefinite term", through Bill 1110, excluding already granted concessions and approved with 59 votes in favor by the National Assembly (AN), on November 3, 2023. However, the constitutionality of the already approved new concession between the Government of Panana and Minera Panamá S. A. was questioned, leading to more uncertainty.

=== Candelaria ===
In October 2014, Lundin Mining agreed to acquire an 80% interest in the Candelaria mining complex in the Atacama Region of Chile from Freeport-McMoRan for $1.8 billion. To help fund the acquisition cost, Franco-Nevada paid $648 million to acquire a gold and silver stream on the Candelaria mine.

At the time, the mine had reserves supporting a 14 year mine life. Lundin Mining had great exploration success expanding the underground extensions of the orebody and in its reserve update in September 2020 stated reserves supporting a 25 year mine life.

=== Antamina ===
In October 2015, Franco-Nevada agreed to pay Teck Resources US$610 million for a stream on Teck’s 22.5% share of the silver production on the giant Antamina mine in Peru. Teck owns its stake in Antamina along with BHP, Glencore and Mitsubishi Corp. Antamina is the world’s eighth-largest copper mine. A possible future underground expansion at Antamina could extend the mine life beyond 40 years.

=== Antapaccay ===
In February 2016, Franco-Nevada (Barbados) acquired a gold and silver stream related to the Antapaccay mine in Peru from Glencore for $500 million. The deal was part of a $10 billion debt reduction plan announced by Glencore in September 2015. Glencore invested more than $1.5 billion to build and commission the Antapaccay open-pit mine and plant, which started operations in 2012. Glencore received approval from Peruvian authorities in January 2020 for the development of the Coroccohuayco project on the Antapaccay property. The integrated project would have a 34 year life.

=== Continental Joint Venture ===
In August 2018, Franco-Nevada and Continental Resources entered into a strategic relationship to jointly acquire royalty rights in the SCOOP and STACK oil and gas plays of Oklahoma. Franco-Nevada committed $520 million to the venture to be invested through 2021. The venture was established to acquire royalty rights at the grass-roots level in areas primarily within acreage operated by Continental.

=== Vale Royalty Debentures and Labrador Iron Ore ===
In April 2021, Franco-Nevada acquired 57 million Royalty Debentures for $538 million from the Brazilian Development Bank and the Federal government of Brazil, representing 14.7% of the total issued Royalty Debentures. The Royalty Debentures provide holders with life of mine net sales royalties on Vale's Northern Iron Ore system, Southeastern Iron Ore system and on certain copper and gold operations. Franco-Nevada also accumulated a 9.9% equity investment in Labrador Iron Ore Royalty Corporation, acquired over a number of years for a total investment of C$93 million. The mines associated with both investments produce high grade Iron ore products that allow steelmakers to reduce CO_{2} and other emissions from their operations.

== Succession ==
In May 2020, after more than twelve years in the role, Pierre Lassonde stepped down as Chair of Franco-Nevada, taking the role of Chair Emeritus. David Harquail, who had been President and CEO since the 2007 IPO, was appointed Chair and Paul Brink as President and CEO.
