= Richard Fifer Carles =

Panamanian Businessman

Richard Fifer
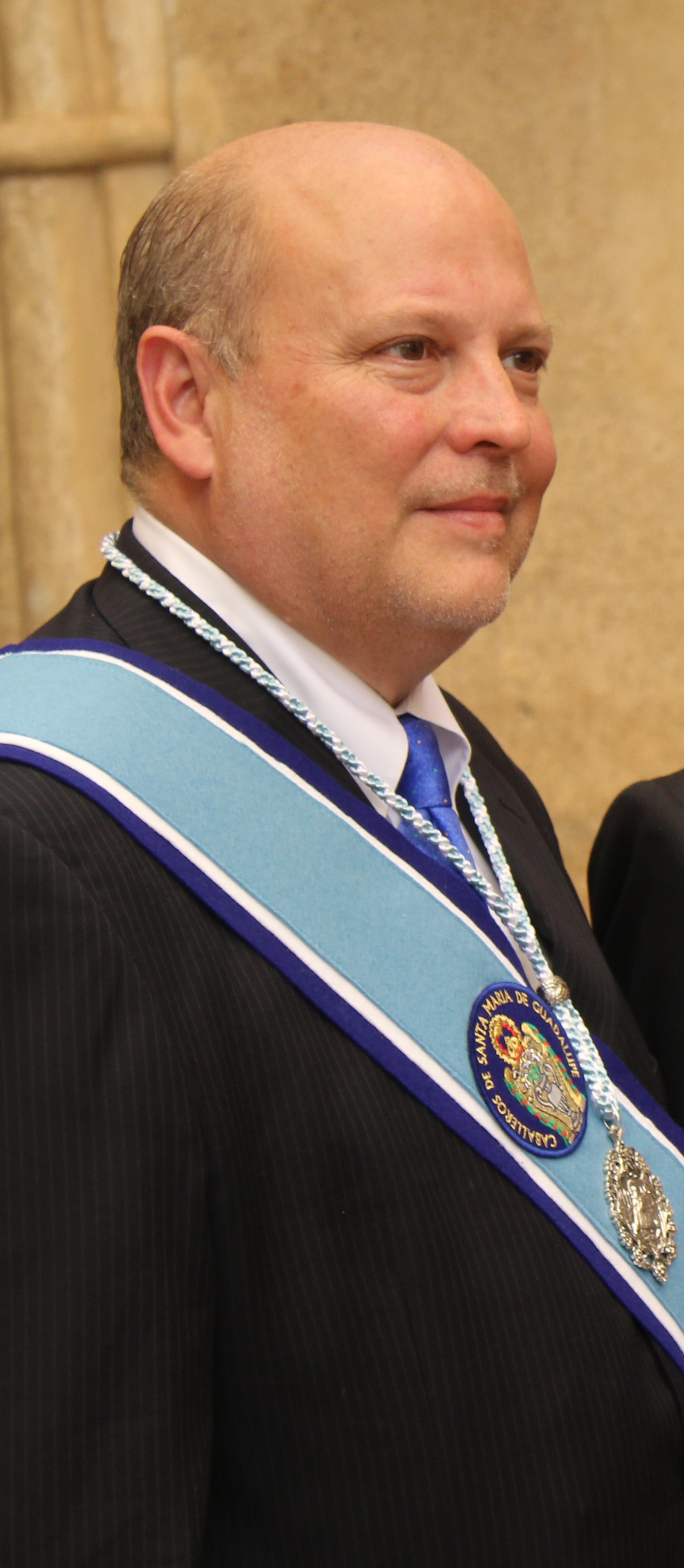
- Fifer in 2011
- Born: Richard Glenn Fifer Carles; January 23, 1957 (age 69); Ancón, Panama
- Education: Tulane University
- Parents: Richard Glenn Fifer Witte (father); Celina Carles Montenegro (mother)

Richard Glenn Fifer Carles (born January 23, 1957) is a Panamanian businessman and former politician. He is called the "Father of modern mining in Panama" by Boletín El Minero.

== Early life and education ==
Richard Fifer is the son of Richard Glen Fifer Witte (son of Anne Witte and Elzy Fifer) and a Panamanian mother, Celina Carles Montenegro (daughter of Celina Isabel Montenegro and Jorge Isaac Carles).

He attended primary school at St. Mary's School, transferred in 9th grade to Curundu Junior High and completed in 1974 his high school education at Balboa High School.

After completing his elementary studies, Richard Fifer-Carles concluded his Bachelor of Science degree at the University of Utah. He is also participated in the Geophysical Engineering program at Rice University and took advanced Finance studies at Tulane University.

== Career ==
As President and CEO of Petaquilla Minerals Ltd, Fifer has been involved in the mining project since its commencement. He serves on the Board of Directors of Petaquilla Minerals Ltd. and has done so on more than one occasion. Petaquilla Minerals Ltd. is a Canadian-based mineral exploration company.

In 1993, he was appointed Governor of the Province of Cocle during the presidency of Mireya Moscoso. While under the Ministry of Foreign Affairs Panama, he was also the President's Plenipotentiary Ambassador-at-large from March 2002 to September 2003. He later returned to the mining industry as president and Chairman of CODEMIN (Corporación de Desarrollo Minero), Panama's State Mining Company. He also assumed the role National Security Advisor to the President of Panama from 1999 to 2002.

Fifer is the founder of Grupo GEO formed by seven companies that provided services and products to diverse industries, such as Oil, Aviation, Mining, Reforestation, and Technology. He is also currently chairman and CEO of another enterprise, Geoinfo International, S. A., a company that operates in Panama through its affiliated company, Geoinfo, S. A., founded in 1992. Its main activities are the development of mapping technologies, the integration of Geographic Information Systems and business intelligence consulting in the Republic of Panama.

Fifer created the Castilla Del Oro Foundation which promotes sustainable development of rural communities in the central provinces in Panama. It aims to promote projects and provide structures that will turn the region into a cultural tourism destination.

Fifer was honored with the title Caballero de Guadalupe in October 2011.

Fifer was the president of Petaquilla Gold SA. Now a bankrupt company which owes $30,000,000 to the "CSS" Caja del Seguro Social and labor benefits to 600 workers.

Fifer was indicted in 2005 for embezzlement and crimes against the public administration, having subtracted $68,000 from the governor's budget and $47,000 from a donation made by the Spanish government, while he was governor of Coclé. In February 2005, an arrest warrant was issued for both Fifer and former Vice Governor Héctor Álvarez at the request of then-Governor Darío Fernández, although Fifer's lawyers filed a habeas corpus that prevented his arrest and Fifer himself returned all the money stolen, leaving in a country precautionary measure for jail
