= Wheaton Precious Metals =

Canadian multinational precious metals streaming company

Wheaton Precious Metals Corp.
- Type: Public
- Traded as: TSX: WPM; NYSE: WPM; LSE: WPM; S&P/TSX 60 component
- Industry: Mining, Silver streaming
- Founded: 2004
- Headquarters: Vancouver, Canada
- Key people: Randy Smallwood (CEO); Peter D. Barnes (former CEO); Douglas M. Holtby (Chair); Randy V. J. Smallwood (President)
- Products: Gold and Silver
- Revenue: US$247.954 mil (2020)▲31%
- Net income: US$105.812 mil (2020)
- Total assets: US$180.275 mil
- Total equity: US$5.516 (2020)
- Number of employees: 35 (2016)
- Divisions: Silver Wheaton Ltd. Silverstone Resource
- Website: wheatonpm.com

Wheaton Precious Metals Corp. is a Canadian multinational precious metals streaming company. It produces over 26 million ounces and sells over 29 million ounces of silver mined by other companies (including Barrick Gold and Goldcorp) as a by-product of their main operations.

Originally named Silver Wheaton, the company changed its name to Wheaton Precious Metals on May 10, 2017.

In 2016, the company reported attributable production totaling 30.4 million ounces of silver and 353,700 ounces of gold, with net earnings of US$195 million on operating cash flows of $584 million.

== History ==
Silver Wheaton was established in 2004. It was previously controlled by Goldcorp until December 7, 2006 when Goldcorp's sale of 18 million shares reduced its ownership to 48%. On February 14, 2008 Goldcorp divested itself completely of Silver Wheaton, selling 108 million shares for C$1.566 billion.

Silverstone Resources, acquired in 2009 previously traded on the TSX Venture Exchange under the symbol SST (delisted May 25, 2009 just after the takeover) as a Tier 1 stock (the exchange's premier tier).

In October 2020, the company was admitted in the London Stock Exchange under the ticker WPM.

== Contracts ==
Although most agreements it makes are short-term contracts, at least one with the Penasquito mine in Mexico lasts the length of the mine's life. Until the third quarter of 2012 all of the gold it sold came from the Minto Mine in the Yukon, acquired in mid-2009 following the Cdn $190 million acquisition of Silverstone Resources Corp. In 3q2012 it started receiving gold from HudBay's 777 polymetallic mine in Manitoba . In 2013 it began receiving gold from 3 new mines: Sudbury (33,000 oz), Salobo (29,100 oz), and Constancia. Average realized price for gold produced at 777 was $1390 which is similar to Minto however, average realized cash cost is 32% higher at mine 777 ($400 vs $303).

In total, there are 15 agreements with 11 different companies; being able to pay a large portion of the contract price in cash initially, and having already developed extensive relationships with mining companies, helps it gain access to the commodity. In 2013 the average price paid per ounce of pure silver was $4.12 up from $4.06, $3.99, $3.97 in 2012, 2011, 2010. Penasquito (one of the largest silver deposits in the world, Silver Wheaton's 25% interest would rank in the top 25 silver mines in the world) will give the company an average of 7 million ounces annually for 22 years (begins early production in 2010–2011). In 2013 Penasquito produced 6.216 million ounces for Silver Wheaton (down from 6.572m in 2012, 5.284m in 2011) at a cost of $4.02 per ounce (up from $3.99, $3.93). Like over half of the world's silver producing mines, the Penasquito mine also produces lead, copper and zinc. In 2013 company production totaled 35.823 million ounces (26.754 million of that pure silver +0%, the rest being gold) 22.0% higher than 2012, 41.2% more than 2011, +110% vs 2009. In 2013 it sold 29.963 million ounces of silver equivalent (+9.6%) at an average price per ounce of $23.58 ($31.09 in 2012, $34.65 in 2011). In 2013 the unit price paid for pure silver was up six cents to $4.12 (incl gold $4.65) while the realized price was down 717 cents to $23.86 (incl gold $23.58). In 2011 though the unit price paid per silver equivalent ounce was only five cents higher at $4.09 it sold each ounce for 67.6% more, in 2010 it was 36.6% more. Total revenue was down 17% in 2013, up 16% in 2012, up 72% in 2011.

== Mines ==
The silver it has agreed to purchase is in Mexico (40%), Portugal (20%), US (10%), Chile (9%), Peru (9%), Argentina (7%), Sweden (4%), Greece and Canada (about 1%). Silver Wheaton doesn't own or operate the mines but the contracts it has with their owners gives it full access to any silver (gold at the Minto Mine) mined there. The six mines from which the company gets most of its silver are : San Dimas, Penasquito, Barrick (made up of five parts), Yauliyacu, Zinkgruvan, Cozamin and Minto. In addition there are six other smaller mines that contribute about 22% of the total.

The San Dimas mine was sold by Goldcorp in the summer of 2010 to Mala Noche Resources Corp. (later renamed Primero Mining) for half a billion dollars complicating things for Silver Wheaton which had already made an agreement with Goldcorp for the silver. In response Silver Wheaton agreed to a new contract agreement. The Penasquito mine which began producing in September 2010 (and has a mine life of 22 years) is Mexico's largest open pit mine.

The agreement it has with Barrick Gold involves the silver produced at 4 mines; Pascua Lama, Lagunas Norte (Peru), Pierina (Peru) and Veladero (Argentina). The deal involving the Lagunas Norte, Pierina and Veladero mines was made in September 2009, required an initial deposit of $212.2 million, gives Silver Wheaton 100% of the silver produced and ends at the conclusion of 2013. The Pascua-Lama mine (at the border of Chile and Argentina) contract gives Silver Wheaton access to a quarter of the silver produced there from 2013 to 2017 and could raise silver sales by 30%.

Subsidiary Silverstone Resources Corp. owns 100% of the life of mine silver produced at mines in Neves-Corvo and Aljustrel, Portugal. The Lundin Mining owned Neves-Corvo mine located near the Iberian Pyrite Belt is primarily a copper and zinc producer.

Mine 777 in Manitoba belongs to HudBay Minerals. The mine was the source of 62.8% of Silver Wheaton's gold produced in 2012. In the last quarter alone it accounted for 19,615 ounces of gold, more than Silver Wheaton's other gold mine produced over the entire year (18,600 oz). When converted to silver equivalent using the gold to silver ratio, gold from 777 accounted for 40.5% of the increase in total production in 2012.
