= First Quantum Minerals =

Canada based mining company

- Formerly: First Quantum Ventures; Zeal Capital; Xenium Resources
- Type: Public
- Traded as: TSX: FM; S&P/TSX 60 component
- Industry: Mining
- Founded: 1983
- Headquarters: Toronto, Ontario, Canada
- Key people: Kevin McArthur (Chair) Tristan Pascall (CEO)
- Products: Copper, Gold, Nickel
- Number of employees: 15,661 (2025)
- Website: https://www.first-quantum.com/

First Quantum Minerals is a Canadian-based mining and metals company whose principal activities include mineral exploration, development, and mining. Its main product is copper, which accounts for 82% of revenues as of 2025.

First Quantum's common shares are listed for trading on the Toronto Stock Exchange in Canada (symbol "FM"). Until 2016, First Quantum also maintained a secondary listing on the London Stock Exchange (symbol "FQM"), in the United Kingdom.

== History ==
First Quantum was founded in 1983 under the name Xenium Resources. It changed its name to Zeal Capital in 1989, First Quantum Ventures in 1993, and First Quantum Minerals in 1996. Its first significant operation was the Bwana Mkubwa mine in Zambia, acquired in 1996.

In 2000, First Quantum acquired a partial interest in Mopani Copper Mines, a Zambian copper company (which was later sold to ZCCM Investment Holdings Plc in 2021). In 2001, it opened the Lonshi Copper Mine in the Democratic Republic of the Congo. Also in 2001, the Company acquired the Kansanshi Mine in Zambia from Cyprus Amax.

In 2004, the Company acquired Guelb Moghrein in Mauritania. They declared commercial production in 2006, completed plant upgrades in 2008, and added a magnetite plant in 2013.

In 2006, First Quantum acquired London-based Adastra Minerals and the Kolwezi tailings project for £140 million in cash and stock. In 2008, First Quantum acquired Toronto-based Scandinavian Minerals Ltd developing the Kevitsa Mine in Lapland, northern Finland. In December 2009, First Quantum acquired the Ravensthorpe Nickel Mine in Western Australia for US$340 million from BHP Billiton. In 2010, First Quantum bought Kiwara plc and the prospecting license for the periphery of the Kabompo Dome, including the Kalumbila copper deposit (now Sentinel) and the Kawako nickel deposit (now Enterprise). The combined project is named Trident and shares processing infrastructure and tailings facilities.

In October 2010, First Quantum acquired Antares Minerals for $450 million, who owned the Haquira deposit in Peru. In November 2010, First Quantum sold its stake in Equinox Minerals. In April 2013, First Quantum successfully completed a hostile takeover of Inmet Mining Corporation (“Inmet”) for CAD$5.1 billion, acquiring the Cobre Panamá project in Panama along with the Las Cruces Mine in Spain, the Çayeli Mine in Türkiye, and the Pyhasalmi Mine in Finland. The Las Cruces and Çayeli Mines were later sold with both transactions closing in 2026. The Pyhasalmi Mine ceased mining operations at the end of its mine life in 2022.

In June 2014, the Company acquired Lumina Copper Corp. This included the Taca Taca copper deposit in northwest Argentina, one of the world’s premier undeveloped copper assets and the updated technical study published in February 2026 reaffirms the substantial value and potential of the project as a major, long-life copper mine with meaningful gold production. Mining operations were expected to begin at Taca Taca in 2024, but as of 2026 it was reported that First Quantum was considering selling Taca Taca.

In 2016, First Quantum sold the Kevista Mine to Boliden AB for US$712 million. In December 2017, First Quantum was announced as "the major mining company that will complete the Pebble Limited Partnership" by Ron Thiessen, president and CEO of Northern Dynasty Minerals Ltd., which is currently the sole owner of the Pebble Partnership. In May 2018, it was announced that First Quantum withdrew from the proposed Pebble Mine partnership.

In 2016, First Quantum was ranked as being among the 13th best of 92 oil, gas, and mining companies on indigenous rights in the Arctic.

In December 2019, Chinese state company Jiangxi Copper agreed to buy a subsidiary of First Quantum's largest shareholder, Pangaea Investment Management Ltd, which held 17.6 percent of First Quantum, causing shares to spike up to five percent. On July 23, 2024, First Quantum and Jiangxi Copper entered into a Shareholder Rights Agreement.

In August 2023, First Quantum acquired a 55% interest in the La Granja copper deposit in Peru from Rio Tinto. First Quantum now operates the project, carrying out further resource drilling and establishing options for the project to become a major copper producer. A technical report for La Granja was released in May 2026.

=== Panama ===
In January 2022, negotiations between the Government of Panama and First Quantum started to define a new contract concerning the Cobre Panamá Mine. First Quantum's subsidiary Minera Panamá S. A. (“MPSA”) made proposals to the Government of Panama including yearly payments of US$375 million in tax and royalty revenue. These payments were offered under the condition that metal prices and profitability of this mine would not drop significantly. However, the Government of Panama halted discussions in December 2022 and announced plans to order the suspension of operations at this mine. In February 2023, the Cobre Panamá Mine suspended ore processing operations after copper concentrate loading operations at Punta Rincón port were halted due to a resolution issued by the Panamá Maritime Authority. Ship loading and ore processing resumed on March 8, 2023.

The congress of Panama approved the revised contract concerning the Cobre Panamá Mine as Bill 1100 in October 2023, which was signed by the President of Panama as Law 406. Protests led to a moratorium on metallic mining throughout the country, "for an indefinite term," excluding already approved concessions, through Bill 1110, which was approved with 59 votes by the National Assembly, on November 3, 2023. However, the constitutionality of the already approved new concession between the Government of Panama and MPSA was questioned, leading to more uncertainty and massive protests in many parts of the country.

First Quantum reported that its subsidiary MPSA made a tax and royalty payment on November 16, 2023 of $567 million for the period from December 2021 to October 2023. This payment is one of the largest ever tax and royalty payments in the history of the global copper mining sector and is the largest fiscal payment ever made in Panama. However, a blockade of small boats at the Punta Rincón port prevented the delivery of supplies that were necessary to operate the power plant at the Cobre Panamá Mine. This blockade forced the mine to halt production on November 23, 2023.

On November 28, 2023, the Plenary Session of the Supreme Court of Justice declared that Law 406, passed on October 20, 2023, which approved the mining concession contract entered into between the State and MPSA was unconstitutional, a ruling issued unanimously. Following the ruling, President Cortizo announced that the Cobre Panamá copper mine would be closed.

Cobre Panamá was put on a preservation and safe management (P&SM) plan following the November 2023 ruling, which was formally approved by the Government of Panama in May 2025. The approval permitted the export of copper concentrate and restart of the power plant at Cobre Panamá.

In August 2025, the Panama Ministry of Environment (“MiAmbiente”) issued the final Terms of Reference for an integral audit of the Cobre Panamá Mine. On 10 October 10, 2025, MiAmbiente formally issued the order for SGS Panama Control Services Inc. (“SGS”) to proceed with the integral audit. MiAmbiente and the Ministry of Commerce and Industries, together with SGS, coordinated the audit planning and implementation, which covered environmental, social, legal, and fiscal compliance aspects.

On June 19, 2026, the final results of the audit were published, with First Quantum achieving an overall score of 88%, meeting or exceeding compliance on 361 out of 370 total commitments. This audit was rejected by environmental organizations, because in over 40 percent of items declared compliant, compliance was decided purely on whether First Quantum presented documentation.

In January 2026, President José Raúl Mulino announced that the GOP would authorize the removal, processing, and export of stockpiled ore to fund the P&SM plan.

A report published in 2026 by Panamanian newspaper La Prensa argues entities with relationships to First Quantum Minerals, majority owner of the Cobre mine, Panama, have engaged in coordinated astroturfing-like campaigns in order to shift public opinion in favor of restarting mining activities, against popular public opinion. This involves fake personal social media profiles posting in favor of restarting mining activities, paying influencers and news outlets to align with the marketing campaign of the mining company as an apparent ideological stance without disclosure, and conventional disclosed advertising and outreach campaigns offering promotional items such as bags. When the company's local PR manager was confronted about it, she deflected the questions and defended their intent. It has also been used to attempt to shift public opinion by posing mining as an ideological stance and thus supporting mining activities by directly or indirectly making relationships between mining and societal issues, even over months, across posts, sometimes mentioning only mining or societal issues in separate posts, and posing a single mine as mining and thus its restart as an ideological or political stance.

=== Democratic Republic of the Congo ===
The Kolwezi tailings project was a major project to extract copper and cobalt from the tailings of older mining operations around Kolwezi. It was expected to produce around 70,000 tonnes per year of copper metal and up to 14,000 tonnes per year of cobalt hydroxide. In August 2009, the DRC government revoked First Quantum's license due to a dispute over renegotiating the contract. First Quantum ceased operations in September 2009, putting 700 people out of work. First Quantum had spent $750 million on acquiring and developing the property. First Quantum took out an action against the DRC government in the International Chamber of Commerce International Court of Arbitration.

The Frontier Mine is an open-pit copper mine located near Sakania. First Quantum obtained exploration licenses in January 2001 and July 2002. Production began in 2007, and in 2010 the mine yielded 322,700 tonnes of copper. The Lonshi Mine is an open-pit copper mine that produces high-grade oxide ore that was transported to Zambia for processing at the Bwana Mkubwa SX/EW plant 35 kilometres (22 mi) away. The mine was closed after the governor of Katanga Province, Moses Katumbi, banned the export of ore to Zambia, insisting that it should be refined in Katanga. In May 2010, a Congolese court ruled that FQM's Lonshi and Frontier copper Mines had been awarded illegally and that they should revert to state-owned Sodimico. According to First Quantum, the ruling was due to the Company's decision to contest the expropriation of its Kolwezi tailings project, which was later sold to the Kazakh mining company Eurasian Natural Resources Corporation (“ENRC”).

In March 2012, an Investment and Settlement Agreement was reached with the DRC and ENRC whereby First Quantum received compensation of US$1.25 billion for its copper assets located in the DRC.

== Operations ==
First Quantum is engaged in the production of copper, nickel and gold, and related activities including exploration and development. The Company has operating mines located in Zambia and Mauritania. The Company’s Cobre Panamá Mine was placed into a phase of Preservation and Safe Management in November 2023. The Company’s Ravensthorpe Mine was placed into a care and maintenance process in May 2024. The Company is progressing the Taca Taca copper-gold-molybdenum project in Argentina and is exploring the La Granja and Haquira copper deposits in Peru.

First Quantum achieved annual copper production of 396 thousand tonnes (“kt”) and annual gold production of 152 thousand ounces (“koz”) in 2025. The Enterprise Mine in Zambia achieved annual nickel production of 23kt.

=== Operating Mines ===
- Kansanshi Mine, near Solwezi in Zambia. Main product copper, by-product gold. Open-pit mine, opened in 2005
- Guelb Mohgrein Mine, near Akjoujt, Mauritania. Main product copper, by-product gold. Open-pit mine, opened 2006
- Sentinel Mine, a copper mine in north-west Zambia opened in 2016 and Enterprise Mine, a nickel mine 12 km (7.5 mi) from Sentinel that opened in 2024. The two mines are collectively called Trident.
- Cobre Panamá Mine, a copper mine in Panama acquired through Inmet, started commercial production in 2019. Cobre Panamá has been in a phase of P&SM since 2023 while the Company waits to renegotiate a new agreement with the Government of Panama.
- Ravensthorpe Nickel Mine, a nickel mine in Western Australia, opened in December 2011, mothballed in 2017. It was brought into production again in 2020, and then put on Care & Maintenance in July 2024 due to a low nickel price environment and high operating costs.

=== Other Investments/Projects ===
- Taca Taca, a copper project in the Puna de Atacama region in Salta Province, Argentina, acquired through the purchase of Lumina Copper in 2014.
- La Granja, one of the largest undeveloped copper resources in the world. Operated by Rio Tinto until August 2023, when First Quantum acquired a 55% interest.
- Haquira copper deposit in the Apurímac Region in southern Peru acquired through the purchase of Antares Minerals in 2010.
- Fishtie copper project in Central Province, Zambia. At the end of September 2012, First Quantum announced that it had entered into a joint venture with a Zambian-based mining company called Mimosa Resources to develop the Fishtie copper project in the Mkushi District near the border with the Democratic Republic of Congo. First Quantum and Mimosa Resources signed a new deal to fast-track the project in late 2023.

=== Former/Mothballed Mines ===
- Çayeli Mine, a copper/zinc mine in eastern Türkiye. This mine was acquired through the takeover of Inmet and started production in 1994. First Quantum sold this mine in 2026 to Cengiz İnşaat, part of Cengiz Holding.
- Las Cruces Mine, a copper mine in Sevilla Province, Spain, acquired through the take-over of Inmet. First Quantum sold this mine in 2026 to Global Panduro.
- Pyhäsalmi Mine, a copper/zinc mine in central Finland, acquired through the take-over of Inmet. Copper and zinc resources were depleted in 2022, and pyrite in 2025. Closure activities at the Pyhäsalmi Mine continue to advance with dismantling works, the end of dewatering and pyrite production, and preparation of tailings areas, while water treatment systems are readied for long‑term use. The Callio Solar Park was commissioned on a reclaimed tailings site, becoming Finland’s first solar park on a mining area with a 13 MWp capacity and approximately 10 GWh annual production.
- Bwana Mkubwa in Copperbelt Province, Zambia, a copper SX/EW plant and mine. This mine was closed in 2010.
- Kevitsa mine, Sodankylä, Finland. Main products are nickel and copper, by product PGE elements. Open pit mine opened in August 2012, and sold in June 2016 to Boliden AB.
- Troilus Gold-Copper Mine, located in northern Quebec, Canada. Troilus was closed in 2008 by Inmet, but recently has been in talks to reopen.
- Winston Lake zinc-copper mine, near Winston Lake, Thunder Bay District, Ontario, Canada. This mine was closed in 1998 by Inmet.
- Sturgeon Lake copper-zinc mine, closed, located near Sturgeon Lake, Kenora District, northwestern Ontario.
