= 2020 in the Democratic Republic of the Congo =

- Decades: 2000s; 2010s; 2020s
- See also: Other events of 2020; History of the DRC

Events in the year 2020 in the Democratic Republic of the Congo.

== Incumbents ==
- President: Félix Tshisekedi
- Prime Minister: Sylvestre Ilunga

== Events ==
- Ongoing since 2018 – Kivu Ebola epidemic
- Ongoing since 2019 – 2019–2020 measles outbreak in the Democratic Republic of the Congo
- 10 March – First confirmed case of COVID-19 in the Democratic Republic of the Congo
- March to May – Flooding in South Kivu Province led to the death of 44 people, 200 were injured, while 64,000 were made homeless.
- 24 May - 20 September – A series of massacres took place, carried out mostly by Islamist rebel group Allied Democratic Forces.
- 12 September – At least 50 people were killed in when landslides collapse three artisanal gold mines near Kamituga, South Kivu. Collapses killed 18 earlier this year in Maniema and Katanga.
- 20 October - Allied Democratic Forces (ADF) reportedly orchestrated a prison escape from the Kangbayi prison in Beni.
- 31 December – ADF rebels kill and in many cases behead 25 people in Tingwe, Beni.

== Deaths ==
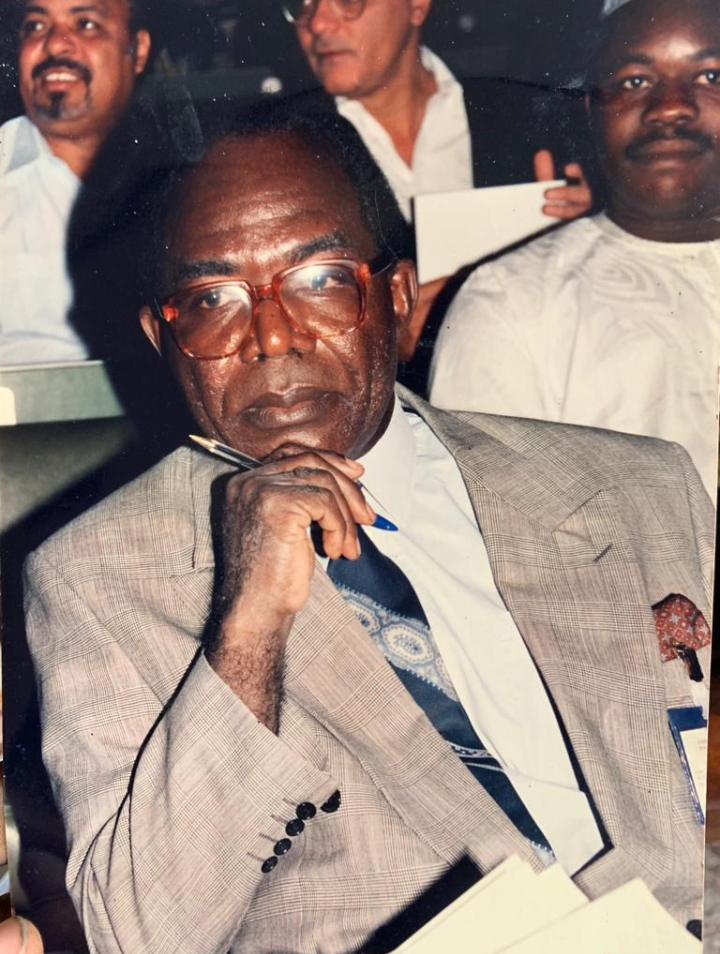
Jacques Kazadi

- 13 January – André Lufwa, sculptor (b. 1925).
- 28 January – Léon Mokuna, football player and manager (b. 1928).
- 15 April – Gérard Mulumba Kalemba, Roman Catholic prelate, Bishop of Mweka (b. 1937).
- 23 April – Jacques Kazadi, economist, professor, and politician (b. 1936).
- 28 May – Celine Fariala Mangaza, disability advocate (b. 1967).
- 2 June – Lugi Gizenga, politician (1965 births).
- 14 June – Pierre Lumbi, politician (b. 1950).
- 21 June – John Bompengo, 52, journalist (Associated Press); COVID-19
- 25 June
  - Emeka Mamale, footballer (b. 1977).
  - Kilasu Massamba, footballer (b. 1950).
- 29 October – Sindika Dokolo, 48, art collector and businessman.
- 1 December – Jean-Pierre Lola Kisanga, 51, politician.

== See also ==
- COVID-19 pandemic in the Democratic Republic of the Congo
- 2020 in Middle Africa
