= Kazadi =

Kazadi is a given name and a surname, usually found in the Democratic Republic of the Congo. It may refer to:

== Given name ==
- Kazadi Mwamba (1947-1998), Congolese footballer and goalkeeper

== Surname ==
- Nicolas Kazadi (born 1966), Congolese politician
- Jacques Kazadi (1936–2020), Congolese politician
- Bestine Kazadi (born 1963), Congolese writer
- Fernand Kazadi (1925–1984), Congolese politician
- Jonathan Kazadi (born 1989), Swiss basketball player
- Patricia Kazadi (born 1988), Polish actress, singer, dancer, and television personality
- Muadianvita Kazadi (born 1973), American football player
- Patrick Kazadi (born 1977), Congolese footballer
- Gladys Kazadi (born 1994), Belgian politician
- Samuel Kazadi (born 2007), Congolese, South African basketball player from Langlaagte
