= 2021 in the Democratic Republic of the Congo =

- Decades: 2000s; 2010s; 2020s
- See also: Other events of 2021; History of the DRC

Events in the year 2021 in the Democratic Republic of the Congo.

== Incumbents ==
- President: Félix Tshisekedi
- Prime Minister
  - Sylvestre Ilunga (until January 29)

== Events ==
Ongoing – COVID-19 pandemic in the Democratic Republic of the Congo, Allied Democratic Forces insurgency (2021 Democratic Republic of the Congo attacks)

=== January and February ===
- January 1 – Two soldiers and 14 Allied Democratic Forces (ADF) rebels are killed in fighting in Loselose village, Beni. Twenty-five civilians were killed on December 31, 2020.
- January 4 – Allied Democratic Forces (ADF) kill 25 civilians in villages of Tingwe, Mwenda and Nzenga.
- January 6
  - China extends debt relief. Congo’s exports to China, mostly in copper (Cu) and cobalt (Co), surged 30% in 2020 compared with 2019.
  - Two children and a woman drown when a boat carrying 100 passengers capsizes near Goma, North Kivu, in Lake Kivu.
- January 8 – President Tshisekedi pardons and releases twenty-two men, including Colonel Eddy Kapend, convicted for the 2001 assassination of former president Laurent-Désiré Kabila.
- January 9 – Six rangers are killed by Mai-Mai fighters in Virunga National Park.
- January 15
  - Forty-six African Pygmies, mostly women and children, are killed (some beheaded) by ADF fighters in Irumu Territory, Ituri Province. Two rebels are arrested.
  - The United States lifts sanctions on Israeli mining magnate Dan Gertler, who has been accused of corruption in the Congo.
- January 17 – President Felix Tshisekedi pays tribute to Patrice Lumumba on the 60th anniversary of his assassination.
- January 22 – The National Assembly files a motion of no-confidence in Prime Minister Sylvestre Ilunga Ilunkamba.
- January 26 – Nine die and 19 are missing after a barge sinks on the Congo River in Tshopo.
- January 29 – Prime Minister Sylvestre Ilunga resigns.
- February 7 – A new case of ebola is reported in North Kivu.
- February 15 – Jean-Michel Sama Lukonde becomes the new Prime Minister; 2021 Congo River disaster
- February 22 – The Italian ambassador to the Democratic Republic of the Congo, Luca Attanasio, is killed in an apparent kidnapping attempt near Kanyamahoro, north of Goma. A carabiniere and their driver are also killed by the attackers. Their group was part of a larger World Food Programme convoy visiting a WFP-run school feeding program in Rutshuru.
- February 24 – Thirteen civilians are killed in Beni and Kisima. 1,010 civilians have been killed in fighting in Kiva since November 2019.

=== March and April ===
- March 8
  - The International Criminal Court will provide $30 million to compensate victims of Bosco Ntaganda.
  - Julienne Lusenge, human rights activist, is awarded the International Women of Courage Award.
- March 14 - At least twelve people were killed in a mass stabbing in Bulongo village, blamed on the Allied Democratic Forces.
- April 12 - The new Lukonde cabinet is formed.

=== May and June ===
- May 22 - 2021 Mount Nyiragongo eruption begins.
- May 8 – Militia chief Jackson Muhukambuto is arrested in connection with 19 murders of rangers in Virunga National Park over a period of three years.

== Scheduled events ==
- April 3-5 — The foreign ministers of Egypt, Ethiopia, and Sudan will meet in Kinshasa for talks on the Grand Ethiopian Renaissance Dam.

== Sports ==
- January 27 – FIFA announces on that Constant Omari failed an integrity and eligibility check and is barred from seeking reelection.

== Births ==
- February 12 – Virunga National Park announces the birth of the first mountain gorilla, a male, of 2021.

== Deaths ==
- January 8 – Dorine Mokha, 31, dancer; malaria.
- February 19 – Joseph Kesenge Wandangakongu, 92, Bishop of Roman Catholic Diocese of Molegbe (1968–1997).
- February 22 – Luca Attanasio, 43, Italian diplomat, ambassador; assassinated
- February 24 – N'Singa Udjuu, 86, politician, First State Commissioner of Zaire (1981–1982).
- March 7 – Josky Kiambukuta, 72, singer (TPOK Jazz).
- March 10 Henri-Thomas Lokondo, 65, politician, MP (since 2006); COVID-19.
- March 21 – Honoré Ngbanda, 74, politician, minister of defense (1990–1997).

== See also ==
- COVID-19 pandemic in the Democratic Republic of the Congo
- African Continental Free Trade Area
- Sexual violence in the Democratic Republic of the Congo
- Democratic Forces for the Liberation of Rwanda
- Politics of the Democratic Republic of the Congo
- International Conference on the Great Lakes Region
