= 2016 in the Democratic Republic of the Congo =

- Decades: 1990s; 2000s; 2010s; 2020s
- See also: Other events of 2016; History of the DRC

The following lists events that happened during 2016 in the Democratic Republic of the Congo.

== Incumbents ==
- President: Joseph Kabila
- Prime Minister: Augustin Matata Ponyo, Samy Badibanga

== Events ==
=== March ===
- 20 March – The presidential and legislative is postponed
- 26 March – Voting is held for the gubernatorial elections in 20 out of 21 reformed provinces of the DRC.

=== April ===
- 24 April - Darryl Lewis, an American citizen and a US military veteran, is arrested at a rally for Moïse Katumbi in Lubumbashi. He was held for six weeks accused of being a mercenary, and released after diplomatic intervention.

=== July ===
- 10 July - Violence breaks out again between Bantu and Pygmies
- 29 July -Lewis files suit against Congolese Justice Minister Alexis Thambwe Mwamba and Kalev Mutond, head of the Agence Nationale de Renseignements (ANR), the secret services, under the Torture Victim Protection Act.

=== August ===
- 16 August - Beni massacre
- 18 August - Protests about Beni massacre.

=== October ===
- 18 October - 20 people are killed in Tanganyika Province after clashes between Pygmy and Bantu militias.

=== November ===
- 27 November - 30 civilians, mostly Hutus, are killed by an ethnic Nande militia in the east of the country.

=== December ===
- 5 December - 31 people are killed in clashes between government and militia forces in Kasai Province.
