= 2008 in the Democratic Republic of the Congo =

- Decades: 1980s; 1990s; 2000s; 2010s; 2020s
- See also: Other events of 2008; History of the DRC

The following lists events that happened during 2008 in the Democratic Republic of the Congo.

== Incumbents ==
- President: Joseph Kabila
- Prime Minister: Antoine Gizenga, Adolphe Muzito

== Events ==
=== January ===
Katanga Mining acquires Nikanor plc for $452 million.

=== February ===
- Findings of the mining contract review announced.
- February 7: Prairie International and the Central African Mining and Exploration Company (CAMEC) announced that operations at Mukondo had restarted.

=== May ===
Cobalt production operations resume at Katanga Mining's Luilu Metallurgical Plant after an extensive restoration program.

=== November ===
Katanga Mining announced temporary suspension of mining and ore processing at the Kolwezi concentrator due to the depressed price of cobalt.
