= 2017 in the Democratic Republic of the Congo =

- Decades: 1990s; 2000s; 2010s; 2020s
- See also: Other events of 2017; History of the DRC

The following lists events in the year 2017 in the Democratic Republic of the Congo.

== Incumbents ==
- President: Joseph Kabila
- Prime Minister: Samy Badibanga, Bruno Tshibala

== Events ==
- 2017: Morgan Stanley projects 1 billion electric vehicles in use globally by 2050 and 800% increase in demand for cobalt, used in electric car batteries, by 2026.
- February 2017 - Glencore agreed to pay Dan Gertler $534m (£407m) for his share of their joint mining interests in DR Congo.
- 14 February 2017 – The UN reveals that Congolese soldiers had killed 101 people including 30 women while fighting the Kamwina Nsapu rebels in Kasaï-Central.
- 23 March 2017 – 2017 Congolese police decapitation attacks
- 22 April 2017 to 1 July 2017 – 2017 Democratic Republic of the Congo Ebola virus outbreak
- 17 May – 2017 Makala prison jailbreak results in 3,000 escapes and up to 100 deaths.
- July 2017 - United Nations has documented 80 mass graves in Kasai unrest that began in August 2016
- 7 August 2017 -Congolese soldiers forces killed at least 14 Bundu dia Kongo (BDK) rebels in clashes in the capital Kinshasa and southwestern city of Matadi.A policeman also died.
- 16 August 2017 – 2017 DR Congo landslide
- 26 August 2017 – The Democratic Republic of the Congo gubernatorial elections, 2017, are held in 11 provinces.
- 29 August 2017 – Three provinces have a second round of voting as part of the gubernatorial elections.
- 6 November 2017 - details emerge in Paradise Papers reporting of a loan from Glencore to Dan Gertler in 2008 when it needed to renegotiate its agreement with state mining company Gécamines for its Katanga mine.
- 7 December 2017 – 2017 Semuliki attack
- 21 December 2017 – Delayed gubernatorial elections are held in three provinces (Kasaï-Central, Mongala, and Equateur).

=== 2017 trends ===
- 2017: the price of cobalt increased 127% over the course of 2017.
- 2017: Congo DR produced 64,000 metric tons of cobalt.

== Deaths ==
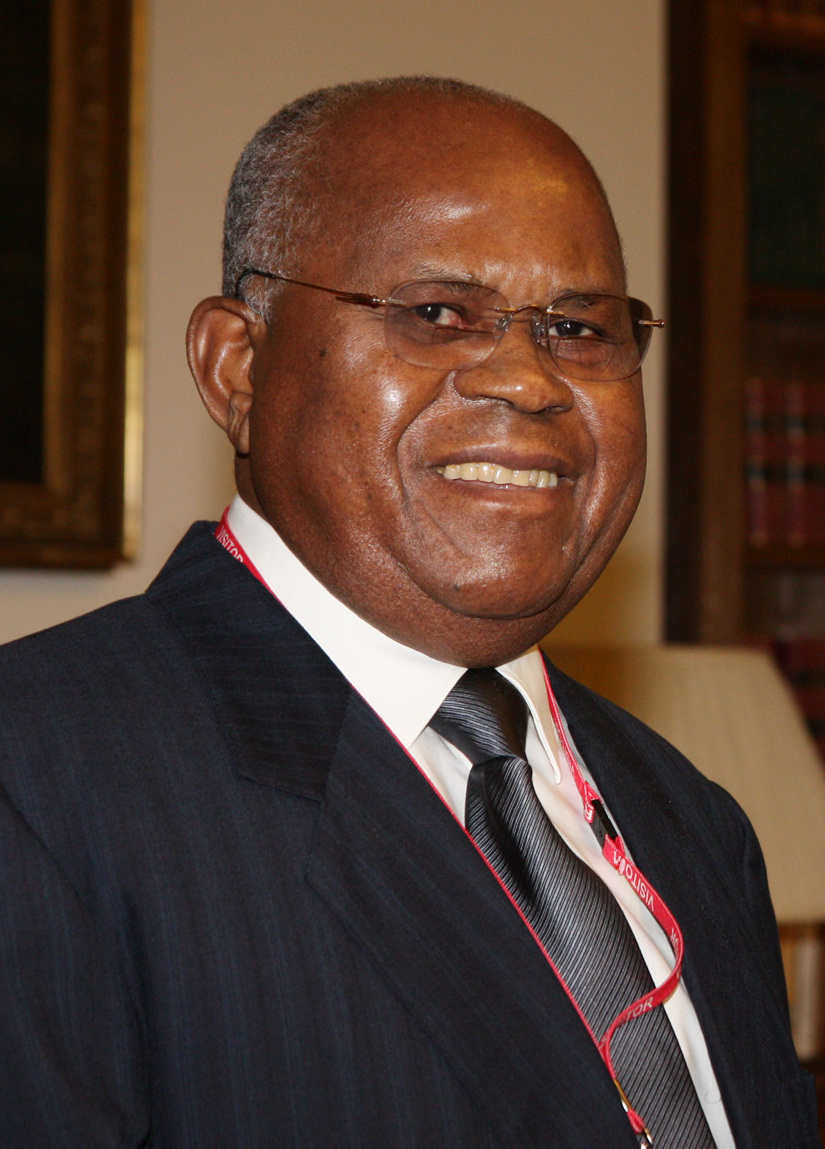
Étienne Tshisekedi

- 1 February – Étienne Tshisekedi, politician (b. 1932).
