= 2004 in the Democratic Republic of the Congo =

- Decades: 1980s; 1990s; 2000s; 2010s; 2020s
- See also: Other events of 2004; History of the DRC

The following lists events that happened during 2004 in the Democratic Republic of the Congo.

== Incumbents ==
- President: Joseph Kabila
- Prime Minister: Vacant

== Events ==
The 2004 Money Laundering Act made money laundering and financing terror illegal and mandated a financial intelligence unit and cooperation with African and European law enforcement.

=== September ===
State-owned Gécamines signs an agreement with Global Enterprises Corporate (GEC), a company formed by the merger of Dan Gertler International (DGI) with Beny Steinmetz Global, to rehabilitate and operate the Kananga and Tilwezembe copper mines. The deal was ratified by presidential decree.
