= 2019 in the Democratic Republic of the Congo =

- Decades: 1990s; 2000s; 2010s; 2020s
- See also: Other events of 2019; History of the DRC

Events in the year 2019 in the Democratic Republic of the Congo.

== Incumbents ==
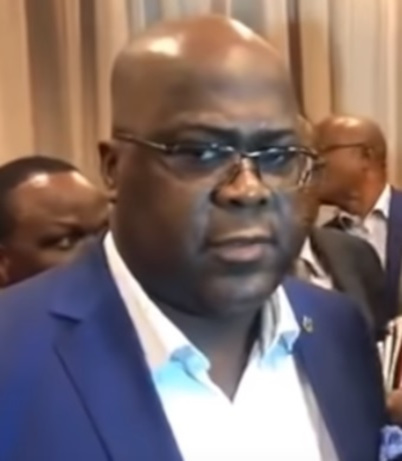
Félix Tshisekedi took over as president from 24 January

- President:
  - Joseph Kabila (until 24 January)
  - Félix Tshisekedi (since 24 January)
- Prime Minister:
  - Bruno Tshibala (until 7 September)
  - Sylvestre Ilunga (since 7 September)

== Events ==
=== January ===
- January 10 – The Independent National Electoral Commission declares that Félix Tshisekedi is the victor of the 30 December 2018 general election.
- January 20 – The Constitutional Court rejects an appeal by Martin Fayulu challenging the result of the election.
- January 24 – Tshisekedi is inaugurated as the 5th President of the DRC.

== Deaths ==
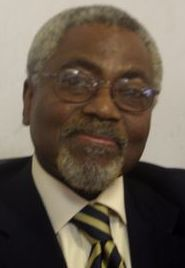
Raymond Ramazani Baya

- 1 January – Raymond Ramazani Baya, politician, Foreign Minister and Ambassador to France (b. 1943).
- 26 January – Ndaye Mulamba, footballer (b. 1948).
- 19 February – Abdoulaye Yerodia Ndombasi, politician, Minister of Foreign Affairs and Vice-President (b. 1933).
