= 2007 in the Democratic Republic of the Congo =

- Decades: 1980s; 1990s; 2000s; 2010s; 2020s
- See also: Other events of 2007; History of the DRC

The following lists events that happened during 2007 in the Democratic Republic of the Congo.

== Incumbents ==
- President: Joseph Kabila
- Prime Minister: Antoine Gizenga

== Events ==
Glencore acquires 50% of SAMREF Congo SPRL in 2007, a Congolese-registered subsidiary of Saudi Aramco Mobil Refinery (Samref Overseas S.A.), registered in Panama, that owns 80% of the Mutanda Mine. Global Witness raised concerns with this transaction and two others, saying that the secrecy that surrounded them raised questions about corruption.

=== January ===
- A World Bank review of the Congo's three largest mining contracts finds that the 2005 concession awards were made with "a complete lack of transparency"

=== March ===
- March 24 - At least 150 people die in Kinshasa in fighting between the military and forces loyal to Senator Jean-Pierre Bemba.

=== May ===
- May 28 - Aid workers claim that at least 17 people have been killed and others abducted by Hutu rebels in the Democratic Republic of the Congo.

=== July ===
July 12 - Red Cross says thousands of displaced Tutsis in the militias' path.

=== December ===
Copper production operations resume at Katanga Mining's Luilu Metallurgical Plant after an extensive restoration program.
