= 2018 in the Democratic Republic of the Congo =

- Decades: 1990s; 2000s; 2010s; 2020s
- See also: Other events of 2018; History of the DRC

Events in the year 2018 in the Democratic Republic of the Congo.

== Incumbents ==
- President: Joseph Kabila
- Prime Minister: Bruno Tshibala

== Events ==
=== May ===
8 May – The 2018 Équateur province Ebola virus outbreak begins.

=== July ===
24 July – The WHO declares the Équateur province Ebola virus outbreak over.

=== August ===
1 August – Another Ebola virus outbreak was confirmed in Kivu in the eastern region of the country.

=== December ===
23 December – scheduled date for the Democratic Republic of the Congo general election, 2018

== Deaths ==
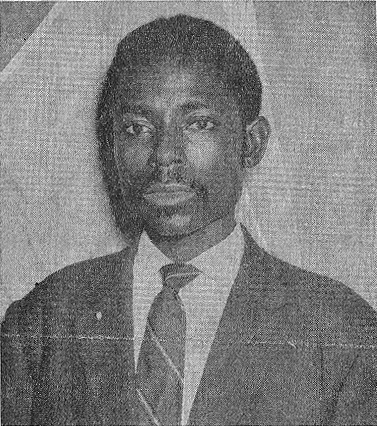
André Bo-Boliko Lokonga

- 30 March – André Bo-Boliko Lokonga, politician (b. 1934).
- 3 July – Barthélemy Mukenge, politician (b. 1925).
- 26 October – Valentin Masengo Mkinda, Roman Catholic prelate (b. 1940).
