= Kamoto mine =

Underground mine in Musonoi, Democratic Republic of the Congo

Kamoto Mine Mine de Dikuluwe
- Location within Democratic Republic of the Congo
- Location: Lualaba Province, Democratic Republic of the Congo; 10°42′53″S 25°23′08″E
- Production: Copper: 270 000 t (2020); Cobalt: 23 900 t (2020)
- Company: Glencore (75%); Gécamines (25%)
- Website: www.kamotocoppercompany.com/en

The Kamoto Mine (French: La mine de Kamoto) is an underground copper and cobalt mine to the west of Musonoi in the former Katanga Province, Democratic Republic of the Congo. As of 2022, the site is the largest active cobalt mine in the world. The mine includes the Luilu metallurgical plant, which accepts ore from KOV mine and Mashamba East mine. The plant has polluted the Luilu River, and tailings also pollute the region with wind-blown dust. The Kolwezi Tailings Project is an attempt to recover additional metal from these tailings.

The exploitation rights are owned by the Kamoto Copper Company (KCC), a joint venture between Katanga Mining (75%) and the state-owned Gécamines (25%). Katanga Mining is now owned by Glencore.

== History ==
Gécamines began operations in the Kamoto underground mine in 1969. The mine produced three million tonnes of ore annually in the 1980s. Before it closed in October 1990 it had produced 59.3 million tonnes of ore, with a grade of 4.21% copper and 0.37% cobalt.

In November 2006 a feasibility study confirmed that the mine could be reopened at relatively low cost given its capacity. The required work included purchase of a new trackless equipment fleet, upgrades to pumping and ventilation equipment and some maintenance of the other infrastructure. The plan was to use a combination of the traditional room-and-pillar mining system and the more modern and effective longhole retreat stoping technique. The concentrator and Luilu metallurgical plant would be progressively upgraded as increasing amounts of ore became available.

In April 2018, Gécamines moved to dissolve the joint venture running the Kamoto mine, citing over $9 billion in debt the mine owed to Glencore and its subsidiaries. Mining at Kamoto was temporarily suspended in November 2018, due to the detection of radioactivity in supplies. Kamoto Copper Company planned to build an ion exchange system to separate uranium out from the cobalt.

As of 2020, Glencore announced the mine was ramping up to a planned full production volume of 270,000 tonnes of copper cathode, and 25,000 tones of cobalt hydroxide for 2020.

== Kamoto concentrator and Luilu metallurgical plant ==
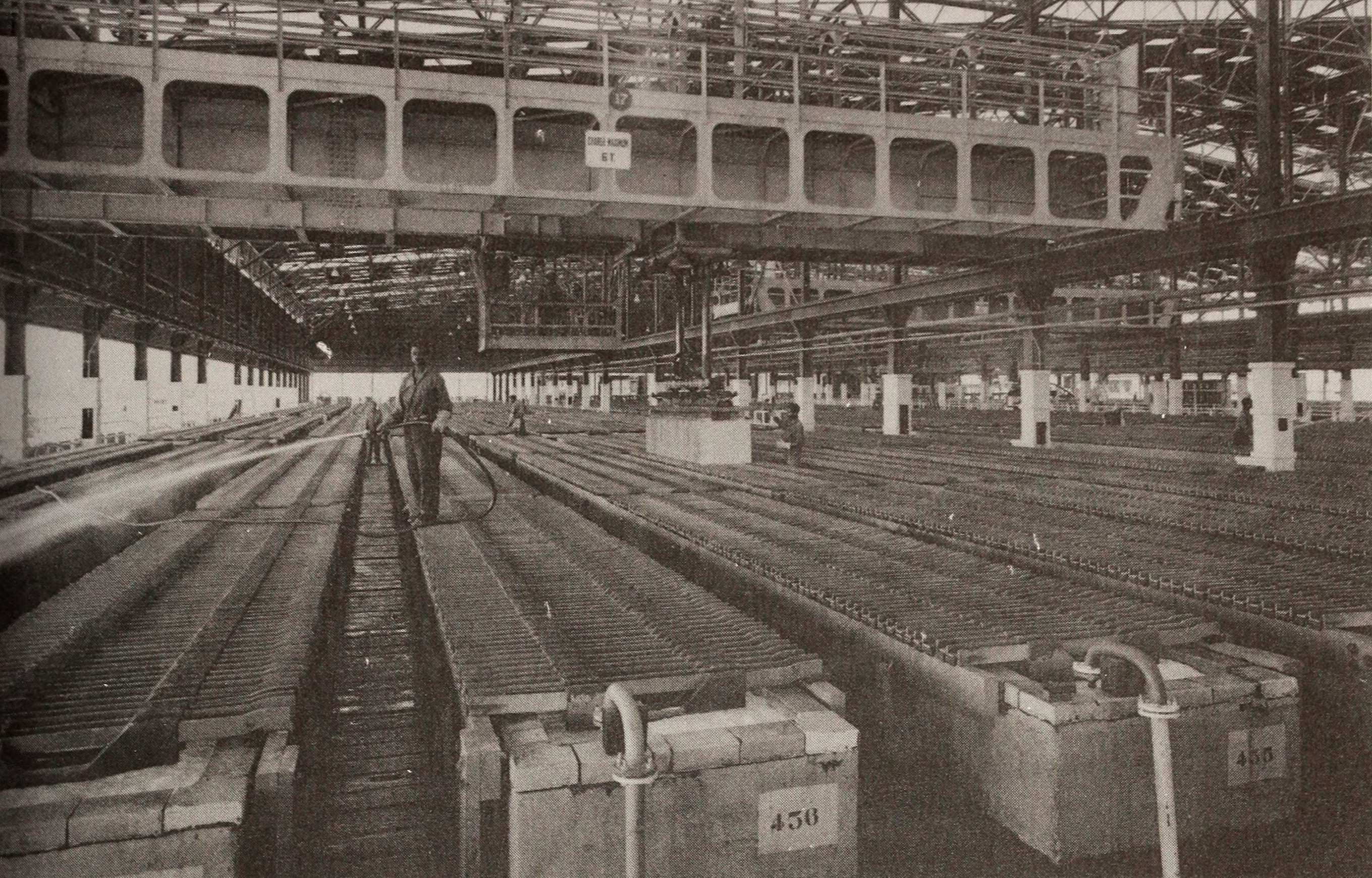
Room where copper is electrolyzed at the Gecamines Luilu refinery near Kolwezi

Gécamines started operating the Luilu refinery at Kolwezi in 1952, taking ores from the western Katanga open pit mines and producing copper concentrates.

From at least 2009 to 2012, the plant discharged heavily acidic waste straight into the Luilu river. A Swiss NGO found the ph of the waste to be 1.9. Locals report that fish can't survive in the acidic water downstream from the plant.

=== Process ===
Sulphide ore from Kamoto mine, KOV mine, and Mashambe East mine are first treated at the Kamoto concentrator, which has a capacity of 12 million tonnes per annum (Mtpa). Then this concentrate is pumped to the roasters at Luilu for further processing.

The Luilu plant burns the concentrate with acid to free up copper, and then passes it through a leaching and electrowinning process to produce final copper and cobalt products.

=== Tailings project ===
The area around the Luilu plant is filled with tailings, and there are extensive pits, waste rock dumps and tailings deposits. The air is polluted by wind-blown tailings. The tailings still contain significant amounts of metal. The Kolwezi tailings project was developed between 2004 and 2009 to extract remaining copper and cobalt from tailings in the Kingamyambo tailings dam and the Musunoi river tailings, which have an estimated total metal content of 1,676,000 tonnes of copper and 363,000 tonnes of cobalt. It was expected to produce around 70,000 tonnes per year of copper metal and up to 14,000 tonnes per year of cobalt hydroxide.

== See also ==
- Kananga Mine
- Tilwezembe
