= 2006 in the Democratic Republic of the Congo =

- Decades: 1980s; 1990s; 2000s; 2010s; 2020s
- See also: Other events of 2006; History of the DRC

The following lists events that happened during 2006 in the Democratic Republic of the Congo.

== Incumbents ==
- President: Joseph Kabila
- Prime Minister: Antoine Gizenga

== Events ==
- Anvil Mining of Australia bought the Kinsevere, Tshiufa and Nambulwa mines, north-west of Lubumbashi, Mining Company Katanga (MCK), controlled by Moïse Katumbi, governor of Katanga Province. MCK acquired the mines from Gécamines when it was privatized. Anvil's board for several years included Katanga's former governor and presidential advisor Augustin Katumba Mwanke. Listed as (AVM) on the Australian (ASX) and Toronto stock exchanges (TSX), Anvil paid 61.3 million dollars for the mines.

=== June 2006 ===
Dan Gertler buys Tremalt for about $60 million.

=== July 2006 ===
Nikanor plc's stock listed on the London Stock Exchange's Alternative Investment Market. Initial public offering raises $400 million; capitalization reaches $1.5 billion. Beny Steinmetz owned 36%, Dan Gertler owned 15%.
