= Kolwezi tailings project =

Coordinates: 10.711551°S 25.396614°E

The Kolwezi tailings project (French: Projet de résidus de Kolwezi) also known as the Roan Tailings Reclamation (RTR; Récupération des résidus de Roan) is a project in the Kolwezi mining area of the Democratic Republic of the Congo (DRC) to recover copper from the tailings, or processed ore, from mining in the region since the 1950s. The project was developed by the Canadian mining companies Adastra Minerals and then First Quantum Minerals between 2004 and 2009, when the DRC government revoked First Quantum's license. The project is currently majority owned by the Eurasian Resources Group.

== Location ==
Kolwezi is a town of about 200,000 people in the Katanga Province of the DRC. It has been a mining center for 100 years. The main river valley is filled with tailings, and there are extensive pits, waste rock dumps and tailings deposits. The air is polluted by wind-blown tailings. Infrastructure such as roads, water supply and management, schools and hospitals was once good, but as of 2004 it was poorly maintained. The state mining company Gécamines no longer provided the high level of social support of the past, and there was very high unemployment. The labor force is skilled and had high expectations of the tailings recovery project.

== Project ==
The state-owned Gécamines started operating the Luilu refinery at Kolwezi in 1952, taking ores from the western Katanga open pit mines and producing copper concentrates. The tailings still contain significant amounts of metal. The project entails construction of a plant to process the copper and cobalt tailings in the Kingamyambo tailings dam and the Musunoi river tailings, which have an estimated total metal content of 1,676,000 tonnes of copper and 363,000 tonnes of cobalt. A Durban company, Metso ND Engineering, was selected to build the equipment. It was expected to produce around 70,000 tonnes per year of copper metal and up to 14,000 tonnes per year of cobalt hydroxide.

== Ownership ==
In June 2004, the Canadian Adastra Minerals acquired the right from the DRC Ministry of Mines to exploit the tailings. In February 2006 it was reported that Adastra was putting together the financing to build a tailings recovery plant. At that time, Adastra was facing a hostile takeover bid from the larger First Quantum Minerals. Following the take-over, the project was operated by a consortium of First Quantum Minerals (65%), with Gécamines and institutional investors having minority shares.

In August 2009, the DRC government revoked First Quantum's license due to a dispute over renegotiating the contract. First Quantum stopped operations in September 2009, throwing about 700 people out of work. First Quantum had spent $750 million on acquiring and developing the property. First Quantum took out an action against the DRC government in the International Chamber of Commerce Court of Arbitration. In June 2010 the Financial Times of Canada reported that the property was now owned by a British Virgin Islands company called Highwind Properties. Highwinds was allegedly linked to a major shareholder in Nikanor, a DRC-based copper mining company that had merged with Katanga Mining in 2007. In August 2010 it emerged that the Kazakh Eurasian Natural Resources Corporation (ENRC) had acquired the property through its British Virgin Islands subsidiary. First Quantum alleged that ENRC had misled investors by failing to tell them of the disputed ownership.

In January 2012, First Quantum settled its action against the Government and ENRC for US$1.25-billion, 'First Quantum was happy with how the litigation was going, and was confident it would get compensation in the future. However, that day was a long way off. At the same time, the legal action was a problem for ENRC, which could not get to work on the DRC projects while ownership was under dispute.

The situation was also a negative for the DRC government, which endured enormous criticism from the international community. Additionally, the government had to deal with thousands of furious Congolese people that lost their jobs when the assets were seized. It is understood the government was eager to end the arbitration.

ENRC approached First Quantum last fall in an attempt to settle, sources said. Broad negotiations would be nearly impossible with so much tension between the two sides. Instead, each company nominated a negotiator, and they reached an agreement that hands US$1.25-billion to First Quantum. ENRC gets a legal ceasefire and proper claims to all of First Quantum’s DRC assets, while the arbitration against the government is dropped.'
