= 2010 in the Democratic Republic of the Congo =

- Decades: 1990s; 2000s; 2010s; 2020s
- See also: Other events of 2010; History of the DRC

The following lists events that happened during 2010 in the Democratic Republic of the Congo.

== Incumbents ==
- President: Joseph Kabila
- Prime Minister: Adolphe Muzito

== Events ==
=== January ===
- January 3 - Mount Nyamuragira erupts, threatening Virunga National Park and local villages.
