= 2015 in the Democratic Republic of the Congo =

- Decades: 1990s; 2000s; 2010s; 2020s
- See also: Other events of 2015; History of the DRC

The following lists events that happened during 2015 in the Democratic Republic of the Congo.

== Incumbents ==
- President: Joseph Kabila
- Prime Minister: Augustin Matata Ponyo

== Events ==
- Forbes estimated that Dan Gertler's wealth is $1.26 billion.
- Orientale Province was dissolved into the provinces of Bas-Uélé, Haut-Uélé, Ituri and Tshopo.

=== January ===
- January 13 - The Congolese military held a press conference announcing the destruction of 4 out of the 20 militant factions operating in South Kivu. Furthermore, the Raïa Mutomboki armed group will undergo disarmament. A total of 39 rebels were killed and 24 captured since the start of the Sokola 2 operation in October 2014, 55 weapons and large quantities of ammunition were also seized. FARDC casualties amounted to 8 killed and 4 wounded.
- January 19 - Police in Kinshasa open fire on protesters opposing efforts by President Joseph Kabila to delay presidential and parliamentary elections due in 2016 leaving at least four people dead and ten injured.
- January 25 - 85 Raïa Mutomboki rebels surrendered to the authorities in the town of Mubambiro, North Kivu, the former militants will be gradually integrated into FARDC. Earlier in January Raïa Mutomboki founder Nyanderema approached the town of Luizi with a group of 9 fighters, announcing their abandonment of armed struggle. 24 rifles, 2 grenades and other military equipment was transferred to FARDC during the two incidents.
- January 31 - The Democratic Republic of the Congo declares a campaign against Hutu rebels.

=== February ===
- February 24 - The Congolese Army launches an offensive against FDLR rebels in South Kivu.

=== April ===
- April 24 - Three UN peacekeepers in the DRC have been reported kidnapped.
