= 2011 in the Democratic Republic of the Congo =

- Decades: 1990s; 2000s; 2010s; 2020s
- See also: Other events of 2011; History of the DRC

The following lists events that happened during 2011 in the Democratic Republic of the Congo.

== Incumbents ==
- President: Joseph Kabila
- Prime Minister: Adolphe Muzito

== Events ==
=== January ===
- January 6 - Médecins Sans Frontières accuses the Democratic Republic of the Congo of not doing enough to prevent war rape after 33 women are raped in Fizi, South Kivu, on New Year's Day.
- January 19 - An army commander in the Democratic Republic of the Congo is accused of leading a recent mass rape in Fizi of at least 50 women.
- January 21 - Authorities in the Democratic Republic of the Congo arrest an army officer over a mass rape of civilians in the east of the country on 1 January.

=== February ===
- February 4 - A new centre to help rape victims in the Democratic Republic of the Congo opens in the eastern city of Bukavu.
- February 14 - 11 members of a family are found dead in eastern Democratic Republic of the Congo after being kidnapped by Ugandan Islamist rebels.
- February 21 - A court in the Democratic Republic of the Congo sentences an army colonel to 20 years imprisonment for crimes against humanity.
- February 27 - Six people are killed in a failed coup attempt on the presidential palace in the Democratic Republic of the Congo.
