= Henri-Thomas Lokondo =

Congolese politician (1955–2021)

Member of the National Assembly for Mbandaka
- In office November 2011 – 10 March 2021

Senator
- In office 2006–2011

Member of the Transitional National Assembly
- In office July 2003 – 8 November 2004
Executive offices
Deputy Minister of Foreign Relations of Zaire
In office 26 February 1996 – 17 May 1997
President	Mobutu Sese Seko
Prime Minister	Faustin Birindwa
Deputy Minister of Public Works of Zaire
In office 2 April 1993 – 6 July 1994
President	Mobutu Sese Seko
Prime Minister	Kengo wa Dondo; Likulia Bolongo

Personal details
- Born: 27 July 1955 Équateur Province, Belgian Congo
- Died: 10 March 2021 (aged 65) Johannesburg, South Africa
- Party: Mouvement Populaire de la Révolution; Union Congolaise pour la Liberté

Henri-Thomas Lokondo Yoka (27 July 1955 – 10 March 2021) was a Congolese politician who served as a deputy in the Democratic Republic of the Congo National Assembly from 2011 until his death in 2021. He previously held office as Deputy Minister of Public Works from 1993 until 1994 and Deputy Minister of Foreign Relations from 1996 until 1997. In the 2000s he formed his own party, the Union Congolaise pour la Liberté.

== Biography ==
Henri-Thomas Lokondo Yoka was born on 27 July 1955 in Équateur Province, Belgian Congo to a Mongo family. He earned a degree in political science with a focus in international relations from the Université libre de Bruxelles. Lokondo then worked in the Congolese government's intelligence services in Uvira. From 1991 until 1992 he participated in the Conference Nationale Souveraine—a national convention that discussed democratisation and political reform—and served as an expert on the Haut Conseil de la République.

On 2 April 1993 Lokondo became Deputy Minister of Public Works under Faustin Birindwa's government. He served in the post until 6 July 1994. On 26 February 1996 he was made Deputy Minister of Foreign Relations under Prime Minister Kengo wa Dondo and remained in office under Likulia Bolongo until 17 May 1997. That day the Alliance des Forces Démocratiques pour la Libération du Congo-Zaïre seized Kinshasa and overthrew the government. Lokondo went into exile in Belgium, though several months later he returned under Laurent-Désiré Kabila's regime and became the Mouvement Populaire de la Révolution (MPR)'s national secretary for communications. He joined several other politicians in December 2000 in demanding Kabila allow for political liberalisation in the Congo. He felt "forgotten" during the Inter-Congolese Dialogue—a series of negotiations between 2001 and 2003 that led to the end of the Second Congo War—and left the MPR. Using money and connections he had garnered during his work in the intelligence services and in the Ministry of Foreign Affairs, Lokondo founded the Union Congolaise pour la Liberté (UCL), a party that soon allied with Joseph Kabila's Parti du Peuple pour la Reconstruction et la Démocratie and others to form the Presidential Majority. In July 2003 he became a member of the Transitional National Assembly on the government's list. In October 2004 President Joseph Kabila appointed him privy councilor to the presidency. On 8 November he vacated his seat in the Assembly. In 2015 Lokondo sought the governorship of Équateur Province.

=== Third Republic parliamentary career ===
Lokondo served in the Senate from 2006 to 2011 and sat on its Foreign Policy Commission. He was elected to the permanent National Assembly on a UCL ticket, representing the Mbandaka constituency, and took his seat that November. He was made a member of the Foreign Relations Commission. Though a member of the Presidential Majority coalition, Lokondo frequently contradicted its official platform in favor of the planks of the UCL. In October 2015, he attempted to secure the vacant post of First Vice President in the Assembly. When the Presidential Majority supported a different candidate, Lokondo ran for the position as an independent. He lost the Assembly vote 271 to 169, still securing more than the approximate 100 votes most observers expected him to receive.

On 10 November 2017, Lokondo filed a motion for an interpellation to be levied against Prime Minister Bruno Tshibala's government concerning its failure to submit a budget proposal to Parliament by 15 September, as stipulated by the Constitution. The motion was the first such proposition in Parliament's history to come from a member of the ruling coalition. It was also the first to be accepted by the Assembly in the history of the Second Parliament of the Third Republic. He also demanded Tshibala's resignation. On 15 January 2018 Lokondo led a group of national deputies and senators in petitioning the Constitutional Court to nullify the 2017 electoral law on the grounds of unconstitutionality. The court narrowly rejected the petition on 30 March, an action Lokondo labeled "a shame for the Republic". Over the course of the year he grew increasingly critical of the central government. On 3 October Lokondo, speaking on behalf of the Parti Lumumbiste Unifié (PALU) and its parliamentary allies, declared that the parties were exiting the Presidential Majority coalition in anticipation of the 2018 general elections. He endorsed Martin Fayulu's presidential candidacy and spoke at rallies in support of him. Lokondo also campaigned for reelection to his seat in Parliament, and was declared the provisional winner in January 2019, pending confirmation of the parliamentary election results by the Constitutional Court. He stated that he would not align with the parliamentary majority or the opposition. His election was later confirmed, and he took up the position of vice president of the "PALU et Allies" political grouping. On 13 August 2019, his membership in PALU et Allies was suspended.

Lokondo contracted COVID-19 during the COVID-19 pandemic in the Democratic Republic of the Congo in January 2021, and went to Johannesburg to receive medical treatment. He died on 10 March 2021, in South Africa.
