= Badibanga =

Badibanga is a surname. Notable people with the surname include:

- Beni Badibanga (born 1996), Belgian footballer, son of Samy
- Samy Badibanga (born 1962), Congolese politician
- Ziguy Badibanga (born 1991), Belgian footballer
