= 2013 in the Democratic Republic of the Congo =

- Decades: 1990s; 2000s; 2010s; 2020s
- See also: Other events of 2013; History of the DRC

The following lists events that happened during 2013 in the Democratic Republic of the Congo.

== Incumbents ==
- President: Joseph Kabila
- Prime Minister: Augustin Matata Ponyo

== Events ==
=== January ===
- January 3 - The March 23 Movement in the Democratic Republic of Congo announces that peace talks will only commence if President Joseph Kabila's government signs a ceasefire.
- January 8 - The March 23 Movement announce a unilateral ceasefire ahead of peace talks with the government.

=== February ===
- February 24 - Eleven African nations including all the members of the African Great Lakes region sign a United Nations brokered peace deal for the eastern region of the Democratic Republic of the Congo.

=== March ===
- March 4 - A Fokker 50 operated by Compagnie Africaine d'Aviation crashes in poor weather at Goma. Nine people were in the aircraft, a crew of five and four passengers and at least three people survived the accident.
- Mai-Mai Kata Katanga unrest in Lubumbashi.

=== May ===
- May 15 - A rebel attack on army positions in Beni leaves at least 31 people dead, including 23 Mai Mai and three FARDC troops.
- May 23 - Ban Ki-moon, Secretary-General of the United Nations, visits the Democratic Republic of the Congo as fighting continues near the eastern city of Goma.

=== August ===
- August 23 - UN troops in the Democratic Republic of the Congo launch an offensive, shelling positions held by rebels near the eastern city of Goma.
- August 30 - M23 rebel chief says fighters to withdraw from frontline of fighting in country's east, as violence spikes.
