= 2014 in the Democratic Republic of the Congo =

- Decades: 1990s; 2000s; 2010s; 2020s
- See also: Other events of 2014; History of the DRC

The following lists events that happened during 2014 in the Democratic Republic of the Congo.

== Incumbents ==
- President: Joseph Kabila
- Prime Minister: Augustin Matata Ponyo

== Events ==
=== April ===
- April 23 – More than 60 people are killed and 80 are seriously injured in a train crash in Katanga Province.

=== June ===
- June 7 – At least 37 people are killed in an attack in South Kivu province.
- June 8 – The United Nations and Military of the Democratic Republic of the Congo sends troops to South Kivu province after 37 people are killed there.

=== August ===
- August 24 – The Democratic Republic of Congo confirms two deaths from Ebola in the north of the country, the first cases reported from the current outbreak in West Africa.

=== October ===
- October 18 – Suspected Ugandan rebels kill more than 20 people near Beni in their second attack in 48 hours.

=== November ===
- November 20 – The Ugandan rebel group kills up to 80 people near Beni in North Kivu.

=== December ===
- December 7 – Ugandan rebels from the Allied Democratic Forces and National Army for the Liberation of Uganda kill 36 people in North Kivu province.
- December 12 – The ferry MV Mutambala capsizes on Lake Tanganyika, leaving at least 26 dead.
- December 14 – The death toll of a capsized ferry MV Mutambala on December 12 in Lake Tanganyika rises to 129 with authorities continuing to search for bodies or survivors.
