= 2012 in the Democratic Republic of the Congo =

- Decades: 1990s; 2000s; 2010s; 2020s
- See also: Other events of 2012; History of the DRC

The following lists events that happened during 2012 in the Democratic Republic of the Congo.

== Incumbents ==
- President: Joseph Kabila
- Prime Minister:
  - until 6 March: Adolphe Muzito
  - 6 March-18 April: Louis Alphonse Koyagialo
  - starting 18 April: Augustin Matata Ponyo

== Events ==
International Monetary Fund suspends loan payments after Congolese government fails to make public the details of a deal involving Gécamines.

=== January ===
- January 27 - The Democratic Republic of the Congo's main opposition leader condemns parliamentary elections as rigged and calls for a general strike on Monday in protest at his house arrest.

=== February ===
- February 12 - A senior aide to the President Joseph Kabila is killed, and the Finance Minister Matata Ponyo Mapon is injured in a plane crash near the town of Bukavu.

=== May ===
- May 9 - Congolese army finds 25 tons of abandoned weapons on Masisi farm.
- May 15 - a fact-finding tour by United Nations/NGO personnel of the Masisi found many internal refugees and accounts of robbery, press gangs and forced labor, water supply problems and shortages of medical supplies. Fighters had used school buildings as living quarters and burned desks and other fixtures for heat. Some fifty women had reported a rape, and there were reports of militia members hiding in Virunga National Park, including one Democratic Forces for the Liberation of Rwanda (FDLR) fighter said to really be working with insurgents. Unexploded ordnance was an issue, as were the National Congress for the Defence of the People (CNDP) affiliations of local Armed Forces of the Democratic Republic of the Congo (FARDC) commander colonel Kabundi, suspected of Mai-Mai sympathies.

=== August ===
- An artisanal gold mine collapses in Orientale Province, killing approximately 60 miners.

=== November ===
- November 21 - M23 militia takes control of town of Sake
