= 2009 in the Democratic Republic of the Congo =

- Decades: 1980s; 1990s; 2000s; 2010s; 2020s
- See also: Other events of 2009; History of the DRC

The following lists events that happened during 2009 in the Democratic Republic of the Congo.

== Incumbents ==
- President: Joseph Kabila
- Prime Minister: Adolphe Muzito

== Events ==
The Child Protection Law of 2009 sets the minimum age for full-time work at 18, unless a parent consents. With parental consent, minors 15–18 may work, but no more than four hours a day. Children are barred from carrying heavy objects. This law is widely unenforced. Approximately 42% of children aged 5–14 were affected by child labor or even forced labor

=== January ===
January 6: Chief of Staff Bosco Ntaganda takes control of the National Congress for the Defence of the People (CNDP) and its founder, Laurent Nkunda, is arrested by the government of Rwanda. UN peacekeepers report unsettled conditions in Kirolirwe, Masisi, and Kiwanja, Rutshuru, due to CNDP, PARECO and various Mai-Mai militias.

January 20: The Congolese government allies with the Rwandan government against rebel forces.

=== February ===
February 16: The government of the DRC announces an end of the Ebola epidemic in the Mweka and Luebo health zones that had been ongoing since February 2008.

=== December ===
December 11: The IMF approves a loan of over $500 million to the Congolese government to help combat poverty and other issues plaguing the country.

December 22: The Belgian government donates €2 million in relief to help conserve endangered UNESCO World Heritage Sites in the DRC.
