= Mashamba East =

- Location within Democratic Republic of the Congo
- Location: Lualaba, Democratic Republic of the Congo; 10°44′35″S 25°23′33″E
- Products: Copper
- Company: Glencore (75%); Gécamines (25%)

Mashamba East is an open pit copper mine near to Kolwezi in Katanga Province, Democratic Republic of the Congo. As of 2014, the mine was not currently being actively worked.

== Location ==
The mine covers an area of 11.04 square kilometres (4.26 sq mi). It is located within the Kolwezi Nappe, a northeast striking synclinal basin about 20 kilometres (12 mi) long by 10 kilometres (6.2 mi) wide. The mine is the easternmost of the Dima pit group, with Mashamba West and then Dikuluwe Open Pit to the west.

== Operations ==
The mine operated from 1985-1988, during which period it produced 9.8 million tonnes of ore at an average grade of 4.96% copper and 0.35% cobalt. The pit was allowed to flood in 1998 for lack of funds. After acquiring the mine, Katanga Mining had plans to restart operations. As of 2009, total measured and indicated resources were 75 million tons at 1.80% copper and 0.38% cobalt. Plans for dewatering were deferred until 2016.

== Ownership ==
The Dima mines were originally owned by the state-owned Gécamines before majority rights were sold to Katanga Mining and Nikanor and in early 2000s. Following the friendly merger of the Katanga Mining and Nikanor assets, there was speculation that the Dikuluwe and Mashamba West deposits were being transferred to Gécamines, and would be exploited by a joint venture owned 32% by Gécamines and 68% by a Chinese consortium. As of 2009 the exploitation rights to the Mashamba East mine were owned by a joint venture, 75% Katanga Mining and 25% Gecamines.
