= 2000 in the Democratic Republic of the Congo =

- Decades: 1980s; 1990s; 2000s; 2010s; 2020s
- See also: Other events of 2000; History of the DRC

The following lists events that happened during 2000 in the Democratic Republic of the Congo.

== Incumbents ==
- President: Laurent-Désiré Kabila

== Events ==
Date	Event
	Second Congo War continues throughout the year. Rebel groups such as the Rally for Congolese Democracy and the Movement for the Liberation of the Congo are supported by Rwanda and Uganda in an effort to overthrow the government.
	There is intense violence in the ongoing Ituri conflict between Lendu farmers and Hema herders in the Ituri Province.
14 March	The Fowler Report is released by the United Nations. It details how various companies and governments including the DRC violated the Lusaka Protocol and UN-imposed sanctions aimed at ending the Angolan Civil War.
5–10 June	In the Six-Day War Rwandan and Ugandan forces clash around the city of Kisangani.
September	The DRC fields runners in the track and road events at the 2000 Summer Olympics in Sydney, Australia.

== Sources ==
- "DR Congo (Zaire)", UCDP Conflict Encyclopedia, Uppsala Conflict Data Program, Uppsala University Department of Peace and Conflict Research, archived from the original on 2015-06-26
