= 2005 in the Democratic Republic of the Congo =

- Decades: 1980s; 1990s; 2000s; 2010s; 2020s
- See also: Other events of 2004; History of the DRC

The following lists events that happened during 2005 in the Democratic Republic of the Congo.

== Incumbents ==
- President: Joseph Kabila
- Prime Minister: Vacant

== Events ==
=== March ===
The Union of Congolese Patriots was accused of responsibility for the deaths of Bangladeshi UN peacekeepers on March 25.

=== August ===
August 3 - The family of President Joseph Kabila received $36 million US from the Congolese state as damages and interest for the murder of the president's aunt, Espérance Kabila, by the colonel Mwamba Takiriri.

=== September ===
September 27 - Five men dressed in the uniform of the (FARDC) broke down the door of Jean Félix Kanonge, an advisor to the union of former Gécamines agents, then the door of the bathroom where he had taken refuge. They informed him that they were there to kill him, but in after his eldest daughter begged for his life they left, taking some $200 and 5 mobile telephones. ASADHO/Katanga (African Association for the defence of Human Rights) said that there had previously been death threats against those who spoke out about Gécamines contracts with Global Enterprises Corporate and Kinross-Forrest.

=== December ===
December 18—Constitutional referendum, initially scheduled for November 27, 2005, was a yes/no vote to accept or refuse the constitution proposed for the Democratic Republic of the Congo. The vote was held on December 18 décembre 2005 and continued December 19.

- 90% of the 35,000 election sites were open on December 18. Of 2,5021,703 registered voters, 15,505,810 voted, for a 61.97% participation, according to the electoral commission (CEI). Yes votes won with 84.31% of the votes.
