= 1998 in the Democratic Republic of the Congo =

- Decades: 1970s; 1980s; 1990s; 2000s; 2010s
- See also: Other events of 1998; History of the DRC

The following lists events that happened during 1998 in the Democratic Republic of the Congo.

== Incumbents ==
- President: Laurent-Désiré Kabila

== Events ==
- The villages of Durba and Watsa in Orientale Province are the center of an outbreak of Marburg virus disease among gold mine workers.

=== April ===
- April 11 - Belgium rebuffs its government minister of DRC due to accusations that Belgian diplomats are involved in arms smuggling.

=== August ===
- August 4 - Rebel forces revolt against Kabila's government in the east of DRC, starting the Second Congo War. Accusations of Rwanda backing them up have been made with Rwanda denying it.
- August 5 - The United States tells DRC's neighbours to not get involved with the rebellion in the east of the country.
- August 6 - Fighting spreads across DRC and on borders with Rwanda, Uganda and Tanzania. Rwanda continues to deny involvement with the rebels and a summit is held in Zimbabwe discussing the conflict.
- August 8 - The talks fail to secure a truce of a ceasefire between the countries at the summit in Zimbabwe.
- August 9 - Democratic Republic of the Congo President Laurent Kabila and Rwandan President Pasteur Bizimungu make accusations against each other after the end of a summit concerning the Second Congo War. Kabila accuses Rwanda of backing up the rebels who captured several Congolese towns. Bizimungu denies Rwanda's involvement in the war and accuses Kabila of making Rwanda a scrapgoat for the rebellion.
- August 10 - Military experts from Namibia, Zimbabwe, Zambia and Tanzania are due in Kinshasa later this week to investigate allegations of Rwandan and Ugandan troops being sent across the border.
- August 15 - The United States closes its embassy in the capital, Kinshasa, due to the conflict.
- August 19 - 75 Royal Marine commandos are sent to DRC.
- August 21 - South African President Nelson Mandela calls for a summit over the Congo conflict on Saturday, inviting the leaders of DRC, Rwanda, Uganda and Zimbabwe to come.
- August 22 - The rebel forces are reported to have made advances to Kinshasa.
- August 27 - After over two hundred civilians are reported to be killed by DRC rebels, Zimbabwe criticises countries that have been secretly aiding the rebels, who called for a ceasefire.
- August 29 - The rebels are reported to have evacuated the port city of Matadi. Angolan troops are reported to have arrived supporting Kabila without fighting in the city.
- August 31 - Second Congo War
  - Rwanda warns DRC that it might invade to protect the ethnic Tutsis.
  - Angola admits to sending troops to DRC.
  - Libyan planes fly to DRC. The government of Libya says it is to evacuate Arab families who went to the Republic of the Congo from DRC.

=== September ===
- September 1 - Second Congo War
  - DRC says that the rebels are surrounded by forces loyal to Kabila in the west.
  - The rebels gain control over Goma, Kabila's home area.
- September 3 - South Africa now says it supports the intervention of DRC by Namibia, Zimbabwe and Angola, supporting Kabila.
- September 9 - Kinshasa is facing serious food shortages due to the war.
- September 12 - Peace talks in Ethiopia to end the war fail.
- September 18 - Kabila flies to Libya, concerning the UN. The United Nations condemns Libya, Sudan and the DRC for breaches against the UN's air embargo against Libya.
- September 19 - President Laurent Kabila leaves Tripoli after a visit that violated the UN's embargo on air links with Libya. Again, the United Nations condemns the two countries for this.
- September 20 - Kabila flies to Libya again, as the third time he has violated the UN's air embargo with Libya.

=== October ===
- October 13 - Rebels say they have taken the government stronghold of Kindu.
- October 15 - Sudanese refugees flee DRC, bringing themselves to a famine in southern Sudan.
- October 23 - A new peace deal is issued by the United Nations for the Congo conflict.
- October 28 - Another peace talk fails in Lusaka, Zambia.

=== November ===
- November 2 - The allies of Kabila's government pledge to step up their military support to drive the rebels out of DRC.
- November 6 - After months of denial, Rwanda finally admits sending troops to DRC.
- November 21 - Talks held in Botswana about the Congo conflict end without an agreement.
- November 24 - Reports from the Republic of the Congo say that twelve people drowned in a Congolese river when a marine patrol boat tried to intercept a canoe in DRC. River traffic was suspended between the two countries for security reasons after the Second Congo War began.
- November 30 - Kabila ends talks with Libyan President Muammar Gaddafi about the Congo conflict and a reported agreement on a ceasefire at the Franco-African summit meeting in Paris.

=== December ===
- December 4 - Zimbabwean President Robert Mugabe defends fighting for DRC, referring to the foreign involvement in Bosnian War.
- December 5 - The rebel leader said that Angolan and Zimbabwean troops have launched a counter-offensive against his troops in the northwest of the Democratic Republic of the Congo.
- December 10 - South Africa states it opposes the Congo talks set in Zambia next week.
- December 18 - Another peace plan for the Congo conflict is issued for December 27-28 in Zambia.
