= 2003 in the Democratic Republic of the Congo =

- Decades: 1980s; 1990s; 2000s; 2010s; 2020s
- See also: Other events of 2003; History of the DRC

The following lists events that happened during 2003 in the Democratic Republic of the Congo.

== Incumbents ==
- President: Joseph Kabila

== Events ==
Date	Event
24 February	At least 200 civilians die in the Bogoro massacre, when rebels attack the village of Bogoro in Ituri Province.
8 May	Many people die in an air disaster when a cargo door of an Ilyushin Il-76 owned by Ukrainian Cargo Airways accidentally opens mid-flight while the aircraft was flying over Mbuji-Mayi with more than 160 people on board.
18 July	Transitional Government of the Democratic Republic of the Congo comes into being to carry out a plan to reunify the country after the Second Congo War, disarm and integrate the warring parties and hold elections.
October	The DRC wins medals in basketball at the All-Africa Games

== Sources ==
- "200 feared dead in Congo air disaster". SBS News. Archived from the original on 2016-08-07.
