= 1999 in the Democratic Republic of the Congo =

- Decades: 1970s; 1980s; 1990s; 2000s; 2010s
- See also: Other events of 1999; History of the DRC

The following lists events that happened during 1999 in the Democratic Republic of the Congo.

== Incumbents ==
- President: Laurent-Désiré Kabila

== Events ==
=== January ===
- January 6 - DRC rebel leaders are alleged to have investigated a massacre of up to 500 civilians, many of them women and children, over the New Year.
- January 7 - Zimbabwe says its military intervention in DRC is being funded by France, Libya and Angola.
- January 13 - Nuns report that teenager soldiers of DRC have carried out a massacre of more than 200 people in the town of Libenge.

=== March ===
- March 1 - Sudan enters the Second Congo War.
- March 12 - The United Kingdom recalls its ambassador to DRC due to the deportation of five Britons accused of spying.

=== April ===
- April 20 - Uganda downplays an agreement in Libya to end the Second Congo War.
- April 21 - Rwanda rejects the peace agreement in Libya to end the Second Congo War.

=== May ===
- May 28 - Rwanda declares a ceasefire in the Democratic Republic of the Congo.
