= 2001 in the Democratic Republic of the Congo =

- Decades: 1980s; 1990s; 2000s; 2010s; 2020s
- See also: Other events of 2001; History of the DRC

The following events took place in 2001 in the Democratic Republic of the Congo.

== Incumbents ==
- President:
  - Laurent-Désiré Kabila (until 16 January)
  - Joseph Kabila (from 17 January)
- Prime Minister: Vacant

== Events ==
=== January ===
- 16 January – President Laurent-Desire Kabila is shot and killed by a bodyguard.
- 17 January – His son Joseph Kabila becomes interim President.

=== April ===
- 26 April – Six members of the International Red Cross were killed in the Ituri Province.

=== August ===
- The government met with rebel group leaders for talks on ending the Second Congo War.

=== September ===
- Kofi Annan, Secretary-General of the United Nations, visited the DRC.
