= 2002 in the Democratic Republic of the Congo =

- Decades: 1980s; 1990s; 2000s; 2010s; 2020s
- See also: Other events of 2002; History of the DRC

The following lists events that happened during 2002 in the Democratic Republic of the Congo.

== Incumbents ==
- President: Joseph Kabila

== Events ==
- Most foreign invaders withdraw.
- Most forests were earmarked for industrial logging: 43.5 million hectares were the subject of 25-year contracts
- Forest Code enacted
- Tin is discovered in the eastern part of the country but mining remains on a limited scale.
- A United Nations panel recommended sanctions against 29 companies, including the George Forrest Group, for the way their operations did business in the DR Congo. The panel also recommended sanctions against 54 individuals.
- new Mining Code, written with input from the World Bank

=== January ===
- January 17 - The eruption of Mount Nyiragongo displaces an estimated 400,000 people.

=== April ===
April 19: Sun City Agreement

=== August ===
- August 28 - Uganda and Zimbabwe begin pulling their troops out of the Democratic Republic of the Congo.

=== September ===
- September 6 - Uganda and the Democratic Republic of the Congo agree to normalise their relations after four years of the Second Congo War.

== Births ==
- 6 October - Jonathan Kuminga, basketball player
