= Celine Fariala Mangaza =

Congolese disabilities activist (1967–2020)

- Born: 27 August 1967; Bukavu, Republic of the Congo (now Democratic Republic of the Congo)
- Died: 28 May 2020 (aged 52); Bukavu, Democratic Republic of the Congo

Celine Fariala Mangaza (27 August 1967 – 28 May 2020, nicknamed Mama Leki) was a Congolese disabilities activist.

== Biography ==
Mangaza was born in Bukavu in the Republic of the Congo on 27 August 1967. She contracted polio at the age of 3. Despite her illness and the tradition of girls not going to school at the time, in 1974, she went to school up to the sixth grade when she left to become a tailor. She set up her own sewing training center for disabled people called the Association for the Wellness of Handicapped Women in 2006. She was also the vice president of Safeco, an NGO in Bukavu that taught Congolese women digital skills.

Leki in the Lingala language translates to "aunt" and is intended to be a sign of respect by the local community.

She married Fidel Batumike in 1994 and the couple had four children.

On 28 May 2020, during the COVID-19 pandemic in the Democratic Republic of the Congo, Mangaza died due to COVID-19 in Bukavu.
