= 2017 DR Congo landslide =

On 16 August 2017, severe flooding caused a mountainside to collapse, triggering a landslide which affected a fishing village in the Democratic Republic of Congo's (DR Congo) Ituri province. The disaster killed at least 200 people. Much of the damage is attributed to poorly regulated housing in vulnerable mountainous regions and heavy deforestation.

== Events ==
Heavy rainfall impacted the Ituri province in the eastern Democratic Republic of Congo (DR Congo) on the night of 15 August 2017. West African countries, including the DR Congo, are susceptible to devastating landslides as a growing demand for residential properties force communities to crowd hillsides. Large scale deforestation, occurring in regions throughout the country, incurs significant adverse soil erosion, heightening the threat of slope failure.

A mountainside situated on the western banks of Lake Albert collapsed on 16 August, triggering a landslide which impacted the fishing village of Tora. Initial estimates reported about 40 people were killed by the disaster with as many as 200 others missing. The following day, the province's deputy governor Pacifique Keta announced the death toll had risen to 200 and 50 properties were completely submerged. Four other victims were treated for injuries at Tshomia Hospital.

Deputy governor Keta declared a state of emergency and appealed to the international community for support with relief efforts. Following the landslide in Tora, search and rescue teams from the Red Cross of the DR Congo recovered 44 bodies from the disaster area in the first day. Persistent rainfall disrupted recovery missions, as did the region's topography. The United Nations (UN) sent a humanitarian team to evacuate survivors and assess the damage.
