= Nicolas Kazadi =

Congolese politician

His Excellency Nicolas Kazadi
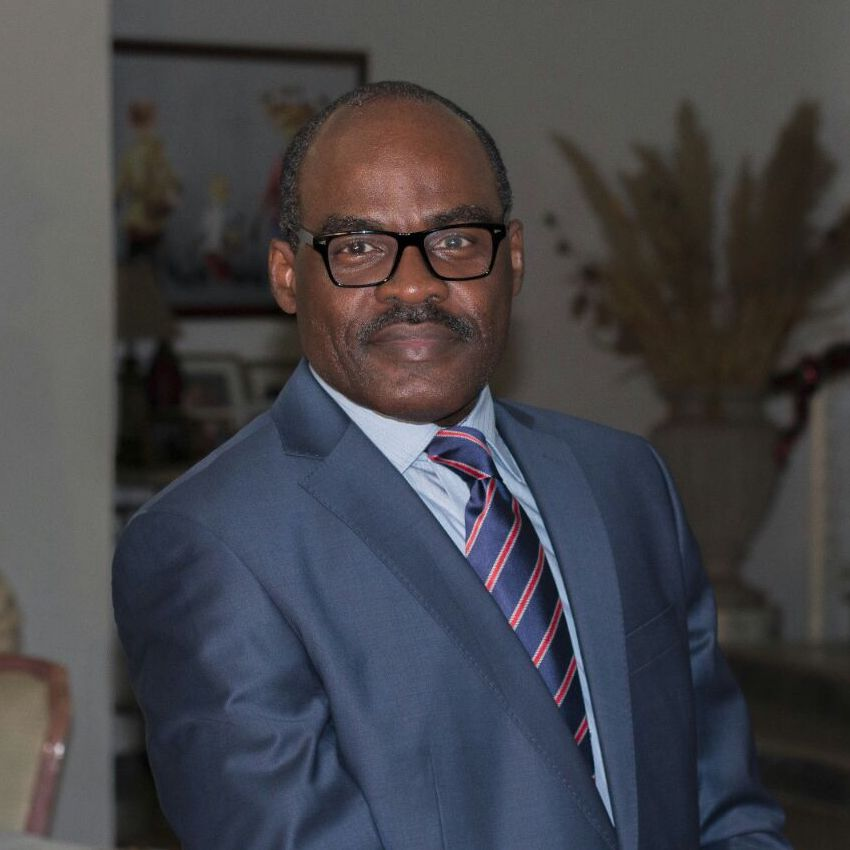
- Nicolas Kazadi in 2018.

Member of Parliament for Miabi
- Incumbent
- Assumed office 12 February 2024
- President: Félix Tshisekedi
- Majority: Union Sacrée de la Nation (USN)

Minister of Finance of the Democratic Republic of the Congo
- In office 28 April 2021 – 13 June 2024
- President: Félix Tshisekedi
- Prime Minister: Jean-Michel Sama Lukonde

Ambassador-at-large of the Democratic Republic of the Congo
- Incumbent
- Assumed office 7 March 2019
- Majority: Cap pour le changement (CACH)

Personal details
- Born: Nicolas Serge Kazadi Kadima-Nzuji; 7 January 1966 (age 60) Léopoldville, Congo
- Citizenship: Democratic Republic of the Congo
- Party: Union for Democracy and Social Progress
- Children: 5
- Parent: Jacques Kazadi (father)
- Education: École nationale d'administration, Pantheon-Sorbonne University, Marien Ngouabi University, University of Reims Champagne-Ardenne
- Alma mater: École nationale d'administration
- Occupation: Diplomat, politician
- Profession: Economist
- Known for: Ambassador-at-large of the Democratic Republic of Congo
- Cabinet: Tshisekedi I

Cabinet of the President of the Democratic Republic of the Congo
Agency overview
- Formed: March 7, 2019
- Headquarters: Palais de la Nation
- Motto: Justice, Paix, Travail (Justice, Peace, Labor)
- Agency executive: Vital Kamerhe, Chief of Staff
- Website: https://presidence.cd

Nicolas Kazadi (born 7 January 1966) is a Congolese politician and career diplomat who has been Ambassador-at-large for the Democratic Republic of the Congo since 7 March 2019 and Minister of Finance since 12 April 2021.

He is a member of the presidential party Union for Democracy and Social Progress (UDPS), the oldest and largest opposition party since President Mobutu cancelled the multi-party system upon his rise to power in 1965.

== Education ==
Kazadi started his university studies at the University of Kinshasa, but transferred to Marien Ngouabi University in neighboring Brazzaville a year later, which is where he graduated with a Bachelor's degree in development planning. He continued his studies in France, where he attended the University of Reims Champagne-Ardenne, obtaining his first Master's degree in Macroeconomics. Kazadi went on to further his studies at Paris 1 Panthéon-Sorbonne University, and obtained a Master's in Economic Regulation and Development Policies.

In 1998, after having kickstarted his professional career at the Central Bank of Congo and the Ministry of Finance for the seven preceding years, Nicolas Kazadi returned to France to attend the prestigious École nationale d'administration. As part of the Averroès promotion (1998–2000), he graduated alongside multiple prominent French political figures such as Alexis Kohler, current secretary general of the French presidency l'Élysée, as well as Fleur Pellerin, former French Minister of Culture and Communication, or again Audrey Azoulay, former French Minister of Culture and current Director-General of UNESCO.

== Return to Zaïre and first career in Congolese government ==
In 1991, Nicolas Kazadi returned to the then Zaïre, starting a career at the Central Bank of Zaïre until transferring to the Ministry of Finance in 1995, as the economic and financial advisor to the minister. It is at the Ministry of Finance that Kazadi is introduced to his colleague Vital Kamerhe, with whom he would work again years later as part of the Presidency of the Democratic Republic of the Congo under President Tshisekedi.

In 1997, Kazadi returned to the new Central Bank of Congo (renamed upon Mobutu's ousting from power) until 1998, the year he returned to France to study at the École Nationale d'Administration. During his second stint at the Central Bank, he was a member of the team in charge of developing and releasing the Zairean zaïre's replacement, the Congolese franc.

In 2001, he returned to Congo and served as Managing Director of the French Chamber of Commerce and Industry in Kinshasa.

== Diplomatic career ==
In January 2002, Kazadi left Congo once again and joined the African Development Bank's headquarters in Abidjan, where he served as advisor and acting alternate executive director, representing the Democratic Republic of the Congo, Cameroon, Congo, Burundi and the Central African Republic.

A year and a half later, although remaining in an intergovernmental organization, Nicolas Kazadi joined the United Nations Development Programme and served as a senior economist and chief of the strategic and policy units in Madagascar, Guinea, Ivory Coast and Togo over a period of 15 years.

== End of diplomatic career and return to Congolese government ==
A long time member of the current Presidential party and advisor to its late founder Étienne Tshisekedi, Nicolas Kazadi left his diplomatic career at the United Nations in December 2018, month of the Congolese Presidential elections, to join the candidate Félix Tshisekedi in Kinshasa. A month and a half after having been elected President of the Democratic Republic of the Congo, Félix Tshisekedi named him Ambassador-at-large on 7 March 2019.

Kazadi was named Minister of Finance on 12 April 2021 and assumed office on 28 April 2021

In April 2024, Nicolas Kazadi was banned from leaving Congolese territory at the request of the Attorney General at the Court of Cassation. The latter was investigating the misappropriation of public funds and corruption in the award and execution of a water borehole construction contract. In June 2024, the National Assembly authorized the opening of an investigation against Nicolas Kazadi. On October 9, 2024, Kazadi was exonerated by the justice system of all wrongdoing.

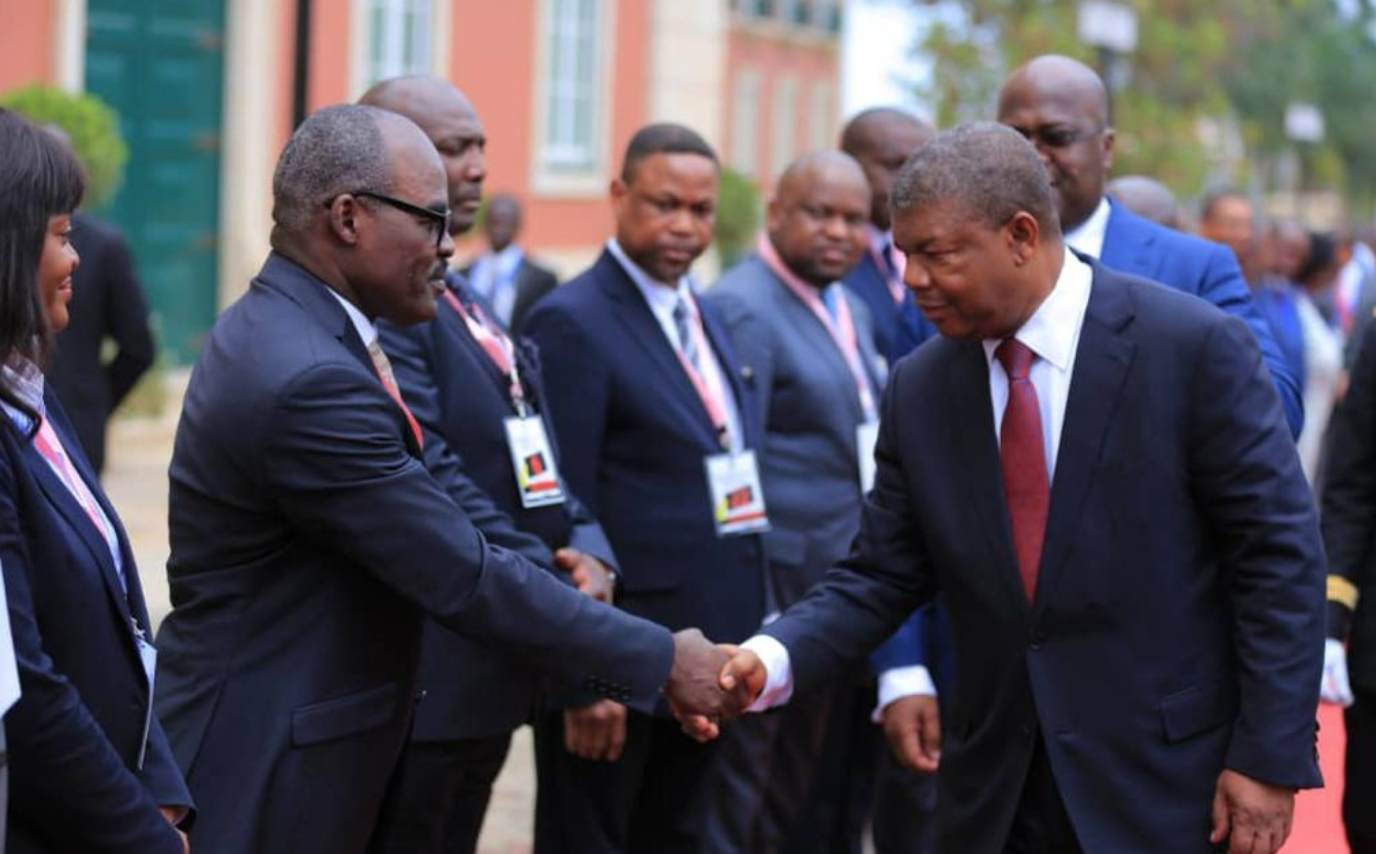
Nicolas Kazadi (left), Angolan President João Lourenço (right), and Congolese President Félix Tshisekedi (behind) 2019.
