= Kananga mine =

Copper mine in the Democratic Republic of the Congo

Kananga Mine Mine de Kananga
- Location within Democratic Republic of the Congo
- Location: Lualaba Province, Democratic Republic of the Congo; 10°39′59″S 25°27′59″E
- Products: Copper
- Company: Glencore (75%); Gécamines (25%)

The Kananga Mine (French: La mine de Kananga) is an open pit copper mine near Kolwezi in Katanga Province, Democratic Republic of the Congo. It is currently officially inactive.

== Resources ==
In September 2007 it was reported that the mine had not been actively mined since March of that year.

Before production stopped, 114,000 tonnes of ore had been mined. The area east of the mine had uneconomical levels of copper, while the western end had been partially mined by Gécamines and more recently by DCP (Democratic Republic of Congo Copper and Cobalt Project). The remaining inferred mineral resource was 4 million tonnes of ore at a grade of 1.44% copper and 0.74% cobalt. The area of title was 11.04 square kilometres (4.26 sq mi).

== Ownership ==
In March 2004, Dan Gertler International in partnership with Beny Steinmetz Global founded a firm named Global Enterprises Corporate (GEC). In May 2004 GEC signed a preliminary agreement with the state-owned Gécamines, finalized in September that year, to rehabilitate and operate the Kananga and Tilwezembe copper mines. Gertler and Steinmetz placed GEC'S 75% share in KOV into Nikanor plc, registered in the Isle of Man. Nikanor's stock was listed on the LSE's Alternative Investment Market in London in July 2006. In January 2008 Katanga Mining finalized acquisition of Nikanor plc for $452m. As of March 2010 the mine was the property of KCC, a subsidiary of Katanga Mining in which Gécamines held an interest.

== See also ==
- Kamoto mine
- Tilwezembe
- Dan Gertler
