= Honoré Ngbanda =

Congolese politician (1946–2021)

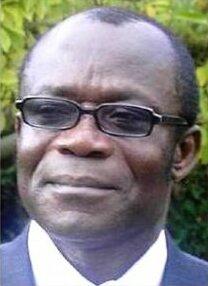
- Ngbanda in 2012

Minister of Defense of Zaire
- In office 1990–1997

Personal details
- Born: Honoré Ngbanda Nzambo Ko Atumba; 5 May 1946 Lisala, Belgian Congo
- Died: 21 March 2021 (aged 74) Morocco

Honoré Ngbanda (5 May 1946 – 21 March 2021) was a Congolese politician and diplomat. He served as Minister of Defense under President Mobutu Sese Seko.

Ngbanda died from COVID-19 in 2021.
