= Nikanor plc =

Former holding company

- Type: Public holding company
- Traded as: AIM: NKR (until 2008)
- Founded: July 2006 (20 years ago) (Douglas, Isle of Man)
- Founder: Dan Gertler
- Defunct: July 2008 (18 years ago)
- Fate: Merged into Katanga Mining Limited
- Headquarters: Douglas, Isle of Man
- Number of locations: Katanga Province, Democratic Republic of the Congo
- Area served: Democratic Republic of the Congo
- Key people: Dan Gertler; CEO Jonathan Leslie
- Total assets: US$452 million (2008)
- Owner: Dan Gertler

Nikanor plc was a publicly quoted holding company for Global Enterprises Corporate (GEC) with assets in the rich Copperbelt region in Katanga Province, Democratic Republic of the Congo (DRC).

Nikanor plc was incorporated in 2006 with its registered head office in Douglas, Isle of Man. Nikanor's stock was listed on the London Stock Exchange's (LSE) Alternative Investment Market in London in July 2006. The initial public offering (IPO) raised US$400 million, and Nikanor's market capitalization reached $1.5 billion.

The senior management team of Nikanor included Emile Mota and Simon Tuma-Waku, who were the chief of staff and Minister of Mines and Energy under DRC President Joseph Kabila. According to Mining Journal, Kabila promulgated the new mining code in 2002.

In May 2007, Beny Steinmetz, Dan Gertler and the Gertler Group, Nikanor's three main stakeholders, launched a hostile take over bid for Nikanor. The bid valued Nikanor's shares at £6.00, the price when it floated, and was presented by the Cosaf Ltd consortium (Note: Cosaf Limited (Cosa) consortium (which also includes the Swiss trader and Gertler's long-time associate, Glencore International AG) is managed by a subsidiary of RP Capital Partners Cayman Island Limited and owned by family members of Dan Gertler and Ruwenzori Limited (Ruwenzori), which is itself controlled by Cosaf. (Early Warning Report 26 March 2010)) (which also includes the Swiss trader and Gertler's long-time associate, Glencore International AG and UK equity fund, RP Capital Partners). (Note: RP Capital Group, co-founded in 2004 by Rafael Berber and Peter Kellner, specializes in alternative investment management strategies and advisory services. RP Capital established Ruwenzori Ltd in 2007 as a "special purpose vehicle" (SPV) to raise £372 million for Nikanor (Mining Journal 2008). RP Explorer Master Fund (RP Explorer) Cosaf Limited (Cosa) is managed by a subsidiary of RP Capital Partners Cayman Island Limited and owned by family members of Dan Gertler and Ruwenzori Limited (Ruwenzori) which is itself controlled by Cosaf) (Early Warning Report 26 March 2010)) The bid was opposed by those shareholders in Nikanor not involved in the bid.

In January 2008, Nikanor was merged into Katanga Mining Limited. (Note: Katanga Mining Limited TSX:KAT operates a major mine complex in the DRC, producing refined copper and cobalt with the "potential of becoming Africa's largest copper producer and the world's largest cobalt producer (Katanga Mining, February 11, 2009).") Katanga Mining Company (KMC) paid $452 million to Nikanor shareholders. Nikanor planned on participating in the consolidation of the companies operating in the Zambian–DRC Copperbelt region.

In a 2011 article by Reuters, journalists described how Glencore and Dan Gertler partnered in Nikanor from 2007 until its final merger with Katanga Mining.

In June 2007, Glencore and partner Dan Gertler, an Israeli mining magnate, paid GB£300 million pounds for a quarter-stake in mining company Nikanor, which was seeking to revive derelict copper mines next to Katanga's. That deal gave Glencore exclusive rights to sell all Nikanor's output – an "offtake" agreement [...] By investing in Nikanor, Glencore consolidated a powerful partnership [...] linked to Gertler, an old Congo hand [with] close ties to government officials including President Joseph Kabila.

On Christmas Eve 2008, in the depths of the global financial crisis, Katanga Mining [...] had lost 97 percent of its market value over the previous six months and was running out of cash. Global credit was drying up, the copper market had fallen 70 percent in just five months, and Congo [...] was the last place an investor wanted to be. [...] For about [US]$500 million in a convertible loan and rights issue, Katanga agreed to issue more than a billion new shares and hand what would become a stake of 74 percent to Glencore [... By early 2011] with copper prices regularly setting records above $10,000 a ton, Katanga's stock market value [had reached] nearly $3.2 billion. [...Since the Glencore acquisition,] Katanga Mining is reaping the benefit of the surging markets and its wealthy, powerful owner. After losing $108 million in 2009, it posted an annual profit of $265 million in 2010.

== Timeline ==
Timeline summary of transactions:

- October 7, 1996: New Inca Gold Ltd corporation was incorporated under the Laws of Bermuda.
- March 2004: Dan Gertler of Dan Gertler International, a diamond dealer and close friend of DRC President Joseph Kabila, in partnership with Beny Steinmetz Global, founded a firm named Global Enterprises Corporate (GEC), which engaged in copper and cobalt refining activities.
- May 5, 2004: GEC signed a preliminary agreement with the DRC's state-owned la Générale des Carrières et des Mines, Gécamines.
- July 8, 2004: New Inca Gold Ltd Corporation consolidated its common shares on a ten-for-one basis and changed its name to Balloch Resources Ltd.
- September 9, 2004: GEC signed a joint-venture agreement with Gécamines to rehabilitate and operate the Kananga and Tilwezembe mines. The deal was ratified by Kabila's presidential decree. The final joint-venture structure was held 75% by GEC and 25% by Gécamines, with GEC undertaking to invest $300–400 million in a new leaching plant, with projected output to reach 200,000 tons of copper a year.
- 2005: Bloomberg Business Week reported that Global Enterprises Corporate Limited was founded in 2005 and was based in the British Virgin Islands.
- Summer 2005: Gécamines granted management of a refining plant at Luilu to George Forrest's Kinross-Forrest subsidiary. In September, they reached an agreement with GEC to share the refinery, the only one in the region. It was rumored that Gertler had used pressure from Kabila to obtain the concession.
- November 30, 2005: Balloch Resources Ltd Corporation (formerly New Inca Gold Ltd) changed its name to Katanga Mining Limited.
- July 17, 2006: GEC became a subsidiary of Katanga Mining Limited.
- 2006: GEC and Gécamines formed a subsidiary named DRC Copper and Cobalt Project (DCP), 75% owned by GEC and 25% by Gécamines. Exploitation permits for their assets were transferred to DCP. Gertler and Steinmetz placed GEC's 75% share in KOV (Komoto Oliveira Virgule), an open cast copper-cobalt project including the Tilwezembe and Kananga deposits and the Kolwesi concentrator, into Nikanor plc, registered in the Isle of Man.
- July 2006: Nikanor plc was incorporated with its registered head office in Douglas, UK. Nikanor's stock was listed on the LSE's Alternative Investment Market. The IPO raised $400 million, and Nikanor's market capitalization reached $1.5 billion.
- February 2007: Mining entrepreneur Moise Katumbi was elected governor of Katanga Province. (Note: Katumbi supported President Joseph Kabila and "helped finance his electoral campaign by selling the rights to the Kinsevere copper deposit", held by Moise Katumbi's firm, Katanga Mining Company (KMC), to Anvil Mining Ltd (Mining Journal, 2008).")
- February 2007: KMC signed a $30 million sub-contracting agreement with Nikanor plc, for the construction of a plant to process copper and cobalt.
- 2007: Bateman Engineering's feasibility study showed that the overall cost of rehabilitating KOV had grown from $1.3 billion to $1.6 billion.
- April 2007: capital expenditure on stage one of the KOV project was estimated at $1.6 billion, and total required funding was estimated at $1.8 billion. By this time the company's market capitalization had fallen to £517 million.
- May 2007: A meeting of Nikanor shareholders was proposed to examined a proposal to raise between $450 and $650 million.
- May 2007: Beny Steinmetz, Dan Gertler and the Gertler Group, Nikanor's three main stakeholders, launched a hostile takeover bid for Nikanor.
- June 1, 2007: Nikanor announced a placement, structured and managed by RP Capital, to raise £372 million. The placing was partially subscribed by Ruwenzori Ltd, a special purpose vehicle (SPV) established by RP Capital.
- June 2007?: Nikanor's stock fell following the announcement that it would issue 62 million new shares to raise £372 million towards developing its KOV mine. (Note: KOV (Komoto Oliveira Virgule) is a "massive open cast copper-cobalt project comprising the world-class assets Tilwezembe and Kananga deposits and the Kolwesi concentrator in the DRC's Katanga province (Sergeant, April 4, 2007).")
- June 2007: Nikanor announced that Glencore would purchase half of the new 62 million shares issued. Glencore agreed to buy the entire copper and cobalt production at its DRC project.
- January 2008: KMC acquired Nikanor plc for $452 million.
- February 2008: It was confirmed that Katanga Mining was selling Dikuluwe Mine and Mashamba West to Gécamines for $825 million. There had been speculation since KMC took over Nikanor that the Dikuluwe and Mashamba West deposits were being transferred to Gécamines, and would be exploited by a joint venture between Gécamines and a Chinese consortium.

== Nikanor plc and DRC Copper and Cobalt Project (DCP) ==
On September 9, 2004, GEC signed a joint-venture (JV) agreement with the state-owned Gécamines to rehabilitate and operate the Kananga and Tilwezembe mines. The deal was ratified by Joseph Kabila's presidential decree. The final joint-venture structure was held 75% by GEC and 25% by Gécamines, with GEC undertaking to invest $300–400 million in a new leaching plant, with projected output to reach 200,000 tons of copper a year, based on its interests in the huge KOV (Komoto Oliveira Virgule). GEC and Gécamines formed a subsidiary named DRC Copper and Cobalt Project (DCP), 75% owned by Global Enterprises Corporate Ltd. and 25% by Gécamines, with properties located next to Katanga Mining's properties near Kolwezi.

=== Nikanor plc and KOV (Komoto Oliveira Virgule) ===
KOV (Komoto Oliveira Virgule) is a "massive open cast copper-cobalt project comprising the world-class assets Tilwezembe and Kananga deposits and the Kolwesi concentrator in the DRC's Katanga province." In 2006, exploitation permits for the assets were transferred to the companies' subsidiary, DCP. Gertler and Steinmetz placed GEC's 75% share of KOV into Nikanor plc, registered in the Isle of Man.

=== Nikanor and Katanga Mining Limited ===
In January 2008, Nikanor was merged into Katanga Mining Limited, when the latter acquired it for $452 million. Katanga Mining Limited operates a major mine complex in the DRC producing refined copper and cobalt with the "potential of becoming Africa's largest copper producer and the world's largest cobalt producer." Katanga paid $452 million in cash to Nikanor shareholders. Nikanor planned on participating in the consolidation of the companies operating in the Zambian–DRC Copperbelt region.

== See also ==
- List of mining companies
- Mining in Africa
