= Lugi Gizenga =

Congolese politician (1965–2020)

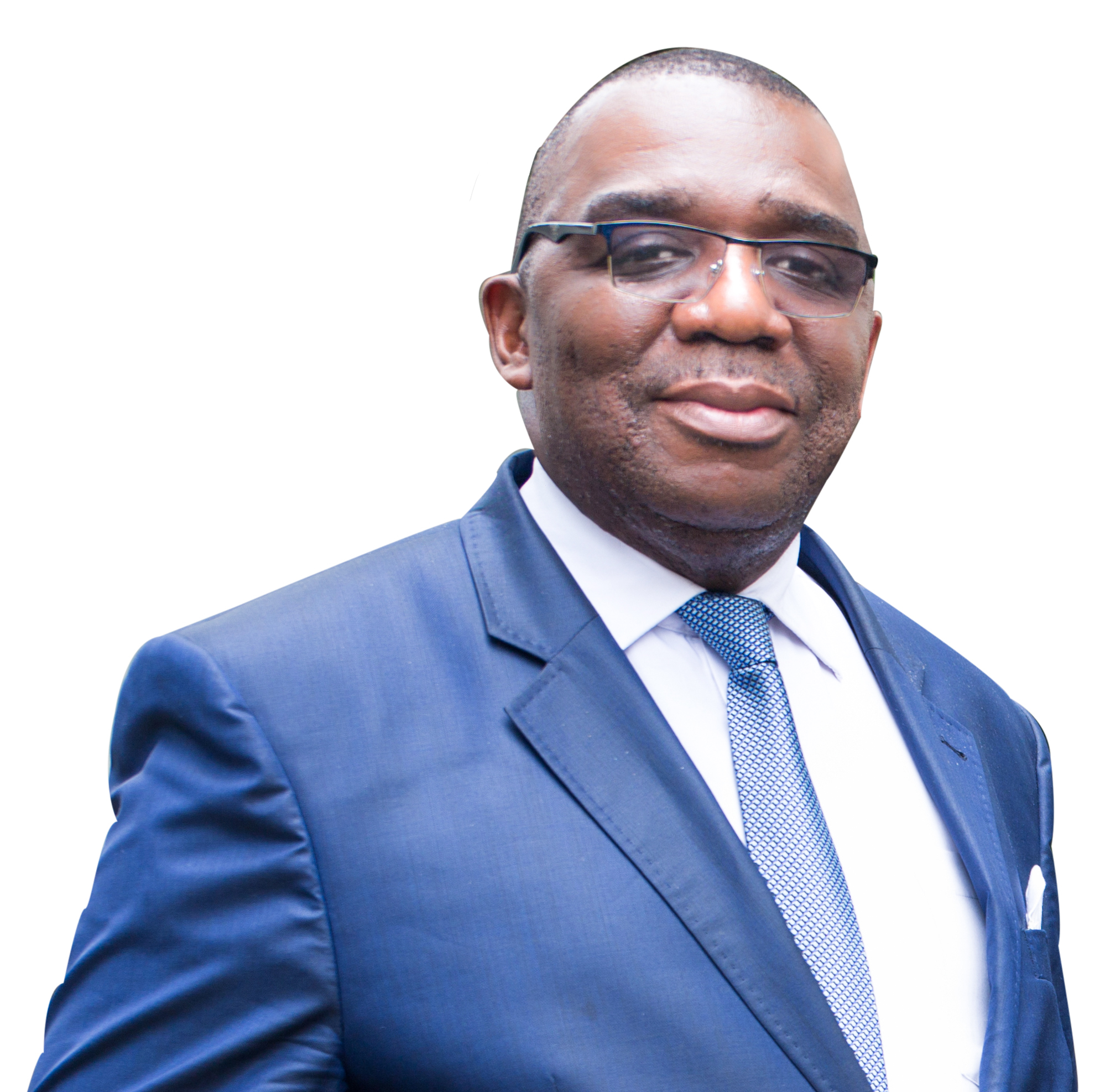
- Lugi Gizenga, Permanent Secretary of the Unified Lumumbist Party, 2015
- Born: 21 September 1965; Léopoldville, Republic of the Congo
- Died: 2 June 2020 (aged 54); Kinshasa, Democratic Republic of the Congo
- Occupation: Politician

Lugi Gizenga (21 September 1965 – 2 June 2020) was a Congolese politician and leader in the Unified Lumumbist Party. He was an advisor in charge of investments and partnerships with Martin Kabwelulu, the Democratic Republic of the Congo's Minister of Mines.

== Biography ==
Gizenga completed his primary studies in Moscow and his secondary studies in France. He graduated from the Lycée Cheminade in Brazzaville and obtained a license in taxation at the Institut supérieur d’études sociales in Kinshasa.

Gizenga worked for the DRC Ministry of Finance, then joined the Ministry of Mines as an advisor for investments and partnerships. He became a leader in the Unified Lumumbist Party (PALU) on 24 October 2015. He had joined the party in 1990 as a young activist in Brazzaville, and subsequently climbed the ranks within the party while in the DRC. He assumed the position of permanent secretary and spokesperson after tension within the PALU, and advocated the Lumumbist block in the National Assembly.

Gizenga was married to Marie Ntumba Gizenga, with whom he had three children. He died on 2 June 2020 in Kinshasa at the age of 54.
