= Dikuluwe Mine =

Mine in the Democratic Republic of the Congo

Dikuluwe Mine Mine de Dikuluwe
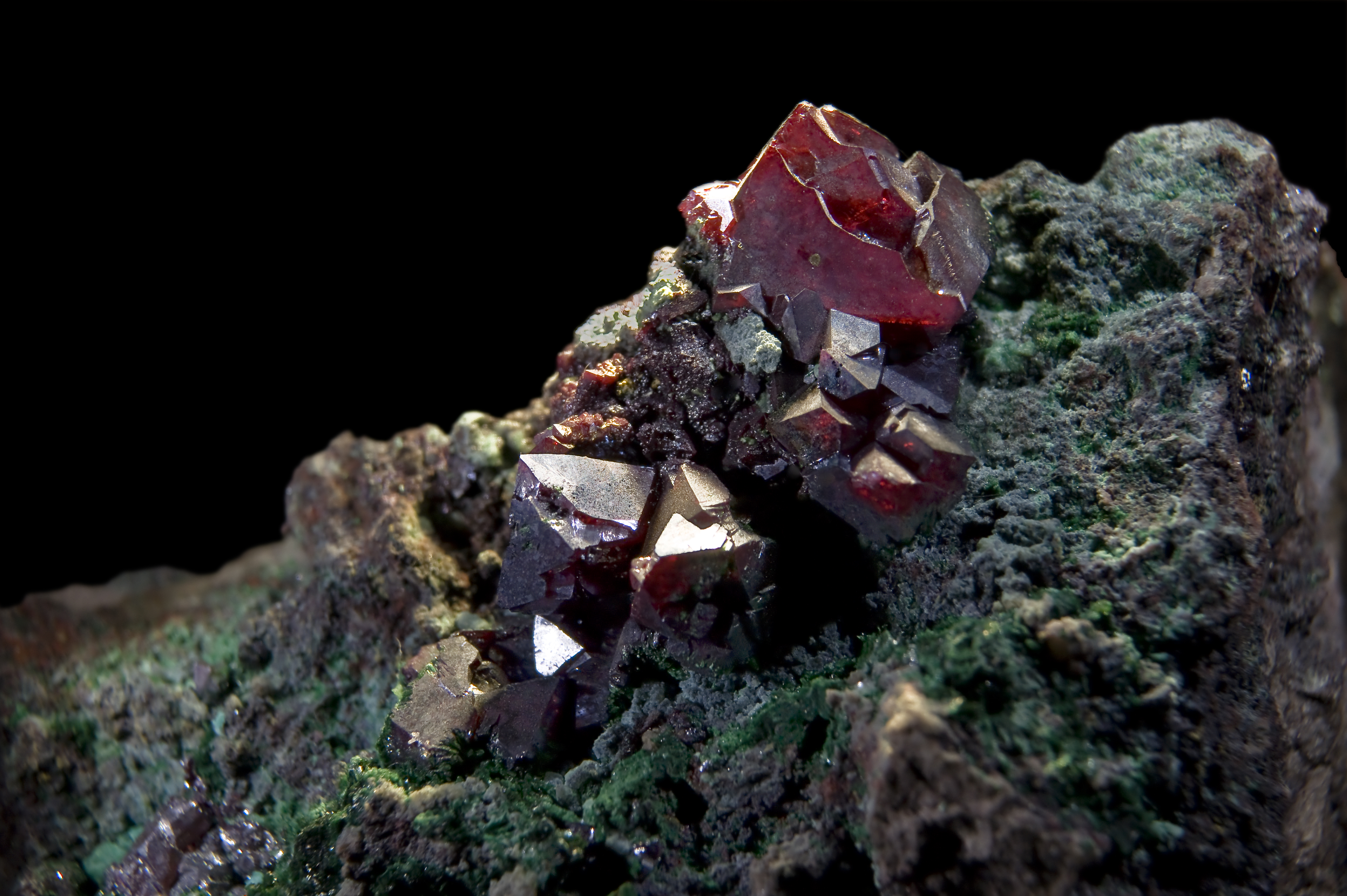
- Cuprite with malachite - Dikuluwe Mine

- Location within Democratic Republic of the Congo
- Location: Lualaba Province, Democratic Republic of the Congo; 10°44′41″S 25°21′45″E
- Products: Copper: 155,630 tons (2020); Cobalt: 886 tons (2020)
- Company: Chinese consortium (68%); Gécamines (32%)
- Website: www.sicomines.com/cn/index.aspx

The Dikuluwe Mine (French: Mine de Dikuluwe) is a copper and cobalt mine near Kolwezi in Lualaba Province of the Democratic Republic of the Congo. Dikuluwe is the westernmost of the Dima Pit group, with Mashamba West and Mashamba East. The quarry was opened in 1975 and was planned to be connected to the nearby Mashamba West pit. The combined Dikuluwe and Mashamba West deposits are now run by La Sino-Congolaise des Mines SA (Sicomines), a joint venture majority owned by a Chinese consortium, with Gécamines holding a minority stake.

Katanga Mining had the license to mine copper ore in the mine, but was not planning to open it for production until 2023.

== Sicomines reorganization ==
On September 17, 2007, a memorandum of understanding was drawn up between a Chinese consortium headed by China Railway and the Congolese state, represented by Pierre Lumbi. This agreement concerned $6.565 billion in infrastructure, but did not specify the amount of investment in the mining concessions. Projects included in the first phase of $3 billion in funding include a 3,400 km highway between Kisangani and Kasumbalesa and a 3,200 km railway from Katanga to the port of Matadi.

In February 2008 Katanga Mining signed an agreement where the Mashamba West and Dikuluwe deposits were transferred to the state-owned Gécamines. In return, Gécamines would replace these deposits with deposits of similar value or pay US$825 million.

A consortium of the Chinese companies China Railway Engineering Corporation, Sinohydro Corporation, and Zhejiang Huayou Cobalt acquired 68% of the property, with the Congolese state-owned Gécamines and Simco holding 32%. In exchange for ownership of the property, the Chinese consortium agreed to invest about $6bn in infrastructure, and $3bn into this and other mining deposits in the DRC funded by a loan from the Exim Bank of China to be paid back from future profits from the mine. The deal has been widely cited as a prototypical example of an resources-for-infrastructure agreement, and one of the most prominent examples of Chinese projects in Africa.

The International Monetary Fund was concerned the debt from the deal would create an unsustainable debt load for the DRC, as the deal was made at the same time the DRC was looking to qualify for financial assistance under the heavily indebted poor countries program. This prompted the scope of the deal to be renegotiated in 2009, from a $9 billion deal down to $6 billion.

In early 2012, the China Exim Bank pulled out as a financier of the deals, taking over the Congolese stake and forcing the Chinese side to mortgage their interest in the mine until $1 billion of already disbursed loans were repaid. However, prompted by competition from the China Development Bank and Bank of China, China Exim bank eventually resumed financing the project.

Production at the mines resumed in 2015, but the project was forced to reduce its planned output due to a lack of available electricity.

In November 2016, Zambia announced that they would be implementing a 7.5% duty on copper concentrate imports beginning in 2017. As Sicomines was exporting its copper to Zambian smelters, the policy was predicted to cause disruptions as Sicomines' main alternative would be shipping the concentrate all the way to China through the port of Durban in South Africa. Zambia then scuttled the plan, due to fears the tax would reduce copper concentrate imports.

In September 2017, DRC Mines minister Martin Kabwelulu wrote to Sicomines saying he disapproved of their practice of shipping unprocessed copper concentrate and cobalt hydroxide rather than copper cathodes and cobalt metal. Kabwelulu demanded that Sicomines export only the processed metal, so it could pay off billions of dollars in infrastructure. This export ban was quickly lifted, without explanation.

In 2021, the Extractive Industries Transparency Initiative (EITI) was drafting a report regarding the 2008 agreement, which was sharply critical of its terms. In advance of the report's release, Sicomines criticized EITI organization as ignorant and non objective.

In November 2021, a leak of financial documents from the BGFIBank Group, known as the Congo Hold-Up, revealed the transfer of $25 million from Sicomines to the Congo Construction Co. (CCC) which passed the money to associates of Joseph Kabila.

== See also ==
- China–Democratic Republic of the Congo relations
- Copper mining in the Democratic Republic of the Congo
