= Gladys Kazadi =

Belgian politician (born 1994)

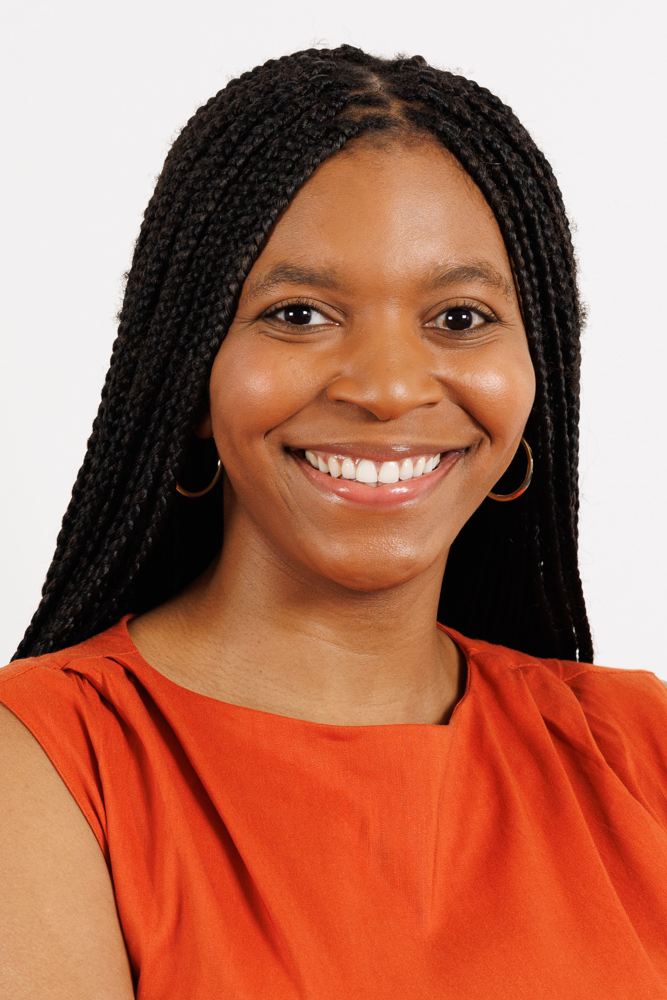
- Kazadi in 2024

Member of the Parliament of the Brussels-Capital Region
- Incumbent
- Assumed office 11 June 2019

Personal details
- Born: 20 April 1994 (age 31)
- Party: Les Engagés

Gladys Kazadi Muanangabu Kaniki (born 20 April 1994) is a Belgian politician. She has been a member of the Parliament of the Brussels-Capital Region since 2019, and has served as group leader of Les Engagés since 2024. Since 2022, she has served as federal vice president of the party. From 2020 to 2021, she was a member of the Parliament of the French Community. In 2021, she was appointed échevine of Berchem-Sainte-Agathe.
