= Kalev Mutond =

Congolese politician (1957–2026)

- Mutond in 2017

General Manager of the Agence nationale de renseignements
- In office 27 October 2011 – 19 March 2019
- President: Joseph Kabila
- Preceded by: Jean-Pierre Daruwezi Mokombe
- Succeeded by: Justin Inzun Kakiak

Personal details
- Born: 3 March 1957
- Died: 5 October 2026 (aged 69) Paris, France
- Occupation: Civil servant

Kalev Mutond (3 March 1957 – 5 October 2026) was a Congolese politician.

== Life and career ==
Born on 3 March 1957, Mutond began his career working as a guard for Western embassies in Kinshasa. He then joined the Alliance of Democratic Forces for the Liberation of Congo, led by Laurent-Désiré Kabila, whose victory helped ascend his career. He became principal administrator of security for the Agence nationale de renseignements in 2007 before being appointed general manager by President Joseph Kabila in 2011.

In 2016, a complaint was filed against Mutond in the United States by Moïse Katumbi, alleging that he was tortured. In December of that year, sanctions were filed against him by the United States Department of the Treasury for alleged illegal mineral exports. In May 2017, he was sanctioned by the European Union for repeated and grave human rights violations during repression of the opposition for the postponed 2016 presidential election. The sanctions were renewed in 2018, 2019, and 2020. He was replaced at the Agence nationale de renseignements on 19 March 2019 by Justin Inzun Kakiak. However, he remained close to Kabila after he left office.

In February 2020, Mutond was detained at N'djili International Airport in Kinshasa for allegedly using a fake diplomatic passport. He was released shortly thereafter but barred from leaving the country. In February 2021, a court in Kinshasa revealed to the public that he had engaged in torture, death threats, and arbitrary arrests during his time at the Agence nationale de renseigments. In the following months, an arrest warrant was issued against him. He then disappeared from the public view, presumably going into exile. In October 2022, he returned to the DRC and began negotiations with authorities after one of his victims, Jean-Bertrand Ewanga, requested that the charges be dropped. In March 2023, he challenged the sanctions placed against him by the Court of Justice of the European Union; they were eventually lifted that June. On 10 August 2023, prosecutor Robert Kumbu announced the suspension of all charges. This decision caused a public complaint from former Minister of Humanitarian Affairs Jean-Claude Muyambo Kyassa.

Mutond died in Paris on 5 October 2026, at the age of 69.
