= Bestine Kazadi =

Bestine Kazadi Ditabala (born 1963 in Belgium) is a Congolese writer.

== Life ==
She was born in Belgium. Kazadi, mother of a daughter born in 1998, graduated in law, a lawyer practicing in Kinshasa and coordinator of the Congolese Studies Program (FRP).

In November 2006, she published a collection of 36 poems, Congo Words for pain, which earned her a presentation ceremony at the Grand Hotel Kinshasa with the Minister of Culture and Arts, Philemon Mukendi.

She is the first Woman President of the Rotary Club Kinshasa in the Democratic Republic of Congo, the first woman '' Major Donor '' in the Democratic Republic of Congo for the global program Rotarian '' Polio + ''. She graduated in Social Sciences and in Law; she practises law, and was admitted to the Bar of Kinshasa.

She published two poetry Collections: 'Congo words evils Editions L'Harmattan in 2006, and Infi (r) nitely Woman in 2009. She also wrote in a compilation of six Congolese writers, ''new Kinshasa'', a new entitled: ''course of life '' in 2008 to the French editions SEPIA. She is President of the Congolese Civil Society Women (SOCIFEC Asbl) network, that wants to unite all the women: ''The leadership and participation of Congolese women in decision-making and power ''.

She is the author of "The Hymn of the International Women for Peace" which she wrote the lyrics which was recorded by a young organist Rosin Ngandu. She wanted by this lyrical song symbolize the struggle for peace. Indeed, in October 2010, during the official opening of the 3rd world march to Bukavu in South Kivu where 40 delegations of women around the world marched with Congolese women hand in hand for peace in the Democratic Republic of Congo . She presented her hymn: "As a gift to the Democratic Republic of Congo in the world to share his ideal of Peace, Unity and Solidarity ..."

== Works ==
- Congo Mots pour maux, Éditions L'Harmattan et Afrique Éditions, 2006, ISBN 978-2296013421
- Infi(r) niment Femme, Éditions Le Cri, 2009, ISBN 978-2-8710-6510-4
