= Jacques Kazadi =

Congolese politician (1936–2020)

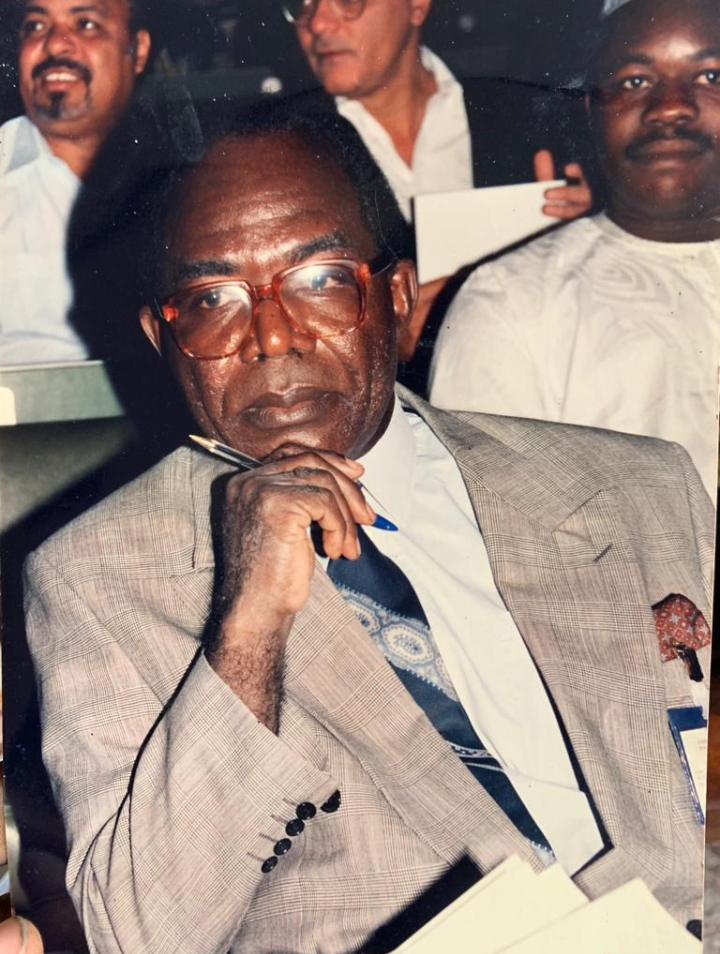
- Jacques Kazadi
- Born: 23 December 1936; Luluabourg, Belgian Congo
- Died: 23 April 2020 (aged 83); Kinshasa, Democratic Republic of the Congo
- Occupation: Economist

Jacques Kazadi (23 December 1936 – 23 April 2020) was a Congolese economist, professor, and politician.

== Biography ==
Kazadi finished his secondary studies at Collège Saint-Joseph in Luluabourg, then attended Lovanium University. From 1967 to 1971, he lived in Belgium with his wife and children to study at the Université catholique de Louvain, where he obtained a doctorate in economics.

Professor Kazadi taught at several universities in the Democratic Republic of the Congo and abroad, including the University of Kinshasa and the University of Michigan. He was then appointed at the first black Dean of the Faculté des Sciences Économiques, and later the first President of the Council for the Development of Social Science Research in Africa (CODESRIA) from 1973 to 1976. CODESRIA is the largest organization of African social science workers on the continent.

During the 1970s, Kazadi entered the political scene with the Popular Movement of the Revolution, led by Mobutu Sese Seko, and the sole party in Zaire at the time, which was a one-party state. He was Secretary of the Treasury until the National Conference of 24 April 1990, when he left the party.

Kazadi was the author of several publications, including Problématique de l’application du SMIG (2004), Politique salariale dans la fonction publique (2007), and L’entreprise privée nationale et la gestion moderne (2008).

== Personal life ==
Kazadi was married and had four children, including Nicolas Kazadi. He died on 23 April 2020 in Kinshasa at the age of 83.
