= Katanga Mining =

Mining company

Katanga Mining Limited
- Traded as: TSX: KAT
- Industry: mining
- Founded: 1996
- Defunct: June 2020
- Fate: merged into Glencore
- Number of employees: 6,400
- Website: www.katangamining.com

Katanga Mining Ltd was a mining company operating in the Democratic Republic of the Congo with its headquarters in Canada. Katanga Mining operated a major mine complex in the Congo's Katanga Province, producing refined copper and cobalt. It claimed to have the "potential of becoming Africa's largest copper producer and the world's largest cobalt producer."

Katanga Mining formed two joint-venture projects with state-owned Gécamines to develop the mining complex: Kamoto Copper Company (KCC) and DRC Copper and Cobalt Project (DCP).

== Assets and ownership ==
The company was first listed on the Toronto Stock Exchange in August 1997.

In January 2008 Katanga Mining acquired Nikanor plc for $452m.

Katanga Mining was purchased by Glencore in 2020 and it was de-listed from the Toronto Stock Exchange.

=== DRC Copper and Cobalt Project ===
DRC Copper and Cobalt Project (DCP) began mining Tilwezembe, an open-pit copper and cobalt mine, in 2007. In November 2008, Katanga Mining said they had temporarily suspended mining at Tilwezembe and ore processing at the Luilu refinery in Kolwezi due to the depressed price of cobalt.

=== Kamoto Copper Company ===
Kamoto Copper Company (KCC) owns a large mining complex near Kolwezi that includes Kamoto mine, Mashamba East, KTE underground mine, Etang South underground mine, KOV mine, and the T17 mine. Ore from these mines is processed at the Kamoto concentrator and the Luilu metallurgical plant. As of 2010 the open pit Kananga Mine was also the property of KCC. The mine was not active.

The Dima mines, consisting of Mashamba East, Mashamba West and Dikuluwe mine were originally owned by the state-owned Gécamines before majority rights were sold to Katanga Mining and Nikanor in the early 2000s. Following the merger with Nikanor in 2008, Katanga sold Dikuluwe and Mashamba West to Gécamines for $825 million. In February 2017 Glencore purchased nearly all of Gecamines interests in Katanga and the larger Mutanda mine. The smaller Katanga mine is remaining closed during 2015-2017 while new processing facilities are constructed. Prior to 2015 Katanga produced 113,000 tonnes/yr of copper while Mutanda continues to produce over 210,000 tonnes/yr

== Incidents ==
February 2015, an overturned truck spilled 60 cubic metres of sulphuric acid.

In January 2018, a dike broke at Kamoto mine, causing a sodium hydrosulphide spill that damaged crops and killed fish. Four hundred and sixty households were affected. Soil contamination had not been cleaned up later in 2018.

== Corruption allegations ==
The release of the Paradise Papers in 2017 revealed details of the 2008-2009 negotiations between Katanga and the Congolese state-owned Gécamines. Due to an impasse in negotiations, they called in the businessmen Dan Gertler to act as a mediator. Along with an indirect personal stake in the Katanga project, Gertler had a close personal relationship with the Congolese president's top advisor Augustin Katumba Mwanke, and allegedly passed along millions in bribes on behalf of Och Ziff Capital Management.

Canada required a $20 million fine from the company in 2019 due to its unclear relationship with the Congolese authorities.
