= Agence nationale de renseignements (Democratic Republic of the Congo) =

DRC intelligence agency

The Agence nationale de renseignements (ANR) is a government intelligence agency of the Democratic Republic of the Congo (DRC). The role of the agency is to ensure "internal security and external security" of the state. The agency was strongly criticized for the disrespect of human rights by several organisations. Inzun Kakiak has led the agency since 2019.

== History ==
=== Background ===
In 1993 the administrative director of the Service national d'identification et de protection (SNIP) was Admiral Mavua Mudima, who became defense minister in the 1996-1997 Kengo wa Dondo government. In November 1993 Admiral Mavua was replaced by his assistant, Goga wa Dondo, a half-brother of prime minister Kengo wa Dondo. Goga wa Dondo was replaced in November 1995 by his assistant, Atundu.

On February 13, 1996, Zaire handed to the Rwandan government rusting artillery pieces, troop carriers, arms and ammunition seized from fleeing Hutu former Rwandan government troops at the end of Rwanda's 1994 genocide. Zairean Defence Minister Admiral Mavua Mudima handed over the weapons in a ceremony near the northwestern Rwandan border with Zaire. The weapons included two 105 mm howitzers, one without its barrel, four anti-aircraft guns and six dusty French-made armoured personnel carriers with flat tyres and smashed windows.

Historically, the intelligence organisation in the DRCongo or Zaire from 1960 to 1997 was named:

- Surêté Nationale (SN) (National security) – 1960–1970
- Centre National de Documentation (CND) (National Documentation Center) – 1970 – November 1985
- Agence Nationale de Documentation (AND) (National Documentation Agency) – November 1985 – August 1990
- Service National d'Intelligence et de Protection (SNIP) (National Service for Intelligence and Protection) – August 1990 – 1996
- Direction Générale de la Surêté Nationale (DGSN) – 1996 – May 1997

=== Formation and early years ===
The ANR was created in the beginning of 1997 as an intelligence service of the Alliance of Democratic Forces for the Liberation of Congo (AFDL). In May 1997, the agency integrated the premises of the former Service national d'intelligence et de protection (SNIP), which had been renamed Direction générale de la sûreté nationale (DGSN) in 1996. On 16 April 1997 Mudima accompanied by General Baramoto Kpama fled the collapsing Mobutu regime, flying to South Africa aboard Baramoto's private jet.

On 13 December 1997, three former senior Mobutu officers (Admiral Mavua Mudima accompanied by Baramoto Kpama, and Nzimbi Nzale) were briefly detained in South Africa after returning from Kahemba, an area still controlled by UNITA forces and awash with ex-FAZ and Hutu militiamen. Their arrest may have pre-empted a coup attempt.

In October 2002, Georges Leta Mangasa, the chairman of ANR, was sentenced to death with other persons in the course of Laurent-Désiré Kabila's assassination. Before this, in 2001, the interim president, Joseph Kabila, appointed Kazadi Nyembwe for the chair of the ANR.

=== Human rights violations accusations ===
The agency has come under criticism under the tenure of Kalev Mutond (Mutondo). Human Rights Watch has accused it of being "instrument of political repression against opposition leaders and human rights and pro-democracy activists during the country's protracted political crisis." Specifically they accuse Mutondo of using the organization to repress political dissent in 2016 around the time that then president Joseph Kabila was remaining in office beyond his constitutional limit. Accusations include those of harassment and torture.

== Management ==
The National Intelligence Agency is headed by a General Manager (Administrateur Général), who directly depends on the president. He is assisted in his task by a Deputy General Manager and senior administrators. He was also under the chairmanship of Laurent-Désiré Kabila, right member of the State Security Committee (Comité de sécurité d'État).

The general manager coordinates all the activities of the ANR in accordance with laws and regulations. As such, it:

- ensures the management of the ANR;
- coordinates and controls the activities of all branches of the ANR;
- give impetus to departments, directorates, divisions, offices and stations by way of instructions, inspections and controls;
- manages the staff, financial resources and the personal and real estate of the ANR;
- ensures compliance with laws and regulations, ethics and discipline within the ANR;
- has the fullness of the disciplinary authority over the entire ANR;
- coordinates cooperation with partner services;
- prepares the budget and manages the accounts of the ANR;
- may reserve the treatment of certain files considered sensitive, important or urgent;
- represents and engages the ANR in its relations with the institutions, services, public and private agencies and third parties.

Parenthetically, the General Manager shall act with decision and also has a cabinet. The Deputy General Manager assists the General Manager in coordinating all activities of the ANR, in accordance with laws and regulations. He assumes the interim in case of absence or incapacity of the managing director.

== Organization ==
The ANR is organize as following:

- The General Manager;
- The Deputy General Manager;
- The departments;
- The central and provincial Directorates;
- The stations.

The central and provincial directorates are divided into divisions, offices, branches and territorial posts as appropriate. The management and the station are run by a part of the ANR coated at least the deputy administrator grade, and named and, if necessary, removed from office by the President of the Republic, on a proposal from the deputy head. Divisions and offices are headed respectively by heads of division and bureau chiefs, appointed and, if necessary, removed from office by the President of the Republic on the proposal of the chief executive. The organic part of the ANR including the deputy head of cabinet is fixed by decree of the President of the Republic.

== Structure ==
The ANR has 11,931 employees and is organized into three departments, sub-divided into directorates, divisions, sections and offices. Each department has at its head, a Principal Administrator (PA). It has a budget of 31,684,000,512 Franc Congolais ~ US $34,252,973 in 2015.

The Department for External Security (ANR/DSE) is responsible for foreign intelligence:

- Directorate of Operations and Planning
- Directorate of Actions
- Directorate of Research and Studies
- Technical directorate

The Department of Homeland Security (ANR/DSI) is responsible for internal intelligence and state security and is working with the relevant prosecution services and the national police; the department is organized in provincial directorates and specialized departments, like the Special Branch Investigations and Research (DSIR), unit suspected of involvement in the arrests of journalists and opposition politiques:

- Directorate of General Intelligence
- Directorate of Operations
- Directorate of Counterintelligence
- Directorate of Studies and Research
- Directorate of Identification
- Technical directorate
- Directorate of Investigations

The Support Department (ANR/DA) is the general services of the ANR and is mainly responsible for logistics support services "devolved" in the provinces:

- Directorate of General Services
- Medical directorate
- Academy of Information and Security
- Telecommunications, Informatics and Documentation Center.

== List of general managers ==
- Victor Nendaka Bika (1960–1965) Surêté Nationale
- Colonel Alexandre singa Boyende Mosambayi (1965–1969) Surêté Nationale
- Lieutenant-colonel Pierre Efomi Akomi (1969) Surêté Nationale
- Colonel Albert Tuzu (1970) CND
- Colonel Raymond Omba Mpe (1971–1973) CND/DDI – Eduard Mokolo wa Mpombo (1971–1976) CND/DDE
- Jean Seti Yale (1973–1976) CND/DDI (1976–1979) CND/DDI-DDE
- Eduard Mokolo wa Mpombo (1979–1985) CND
- Honoré Ngbanda Nzambo Ko Atumba (1985–1990) AND
- Général Likulia Bolongo (1990–1992) SNIP
- Admiral Mavua Mudima (1992–1993) SNIP
- Goda Wa Dondo (1993–1995) SNIP
- Jacques Tshimbombo Mukuna (1996–1997) DGSN
- Paul Kabongo Misasa (1997) ANR
- Clément Kibinda (1997) ANR
- Séverin Kabwe (1997–2001) ANR
- Didier Kazadi Nyembwe (2001–2003) ANR
- Lando Lurhakumbirwa (2003–2006) ANR
- Mira Ndjoku Manyanga (2006–2007) ANR
- Jean-Pierre Daruwezi Mokombe(2007–2011) ANR
- Kalev Mutond (Mutondo) (2011–2019) ANR
- Inzun Kakiak (2019–present)
