= Sylvestre Ilunga =

Prime Minister of the Democratic Republic of the Congo

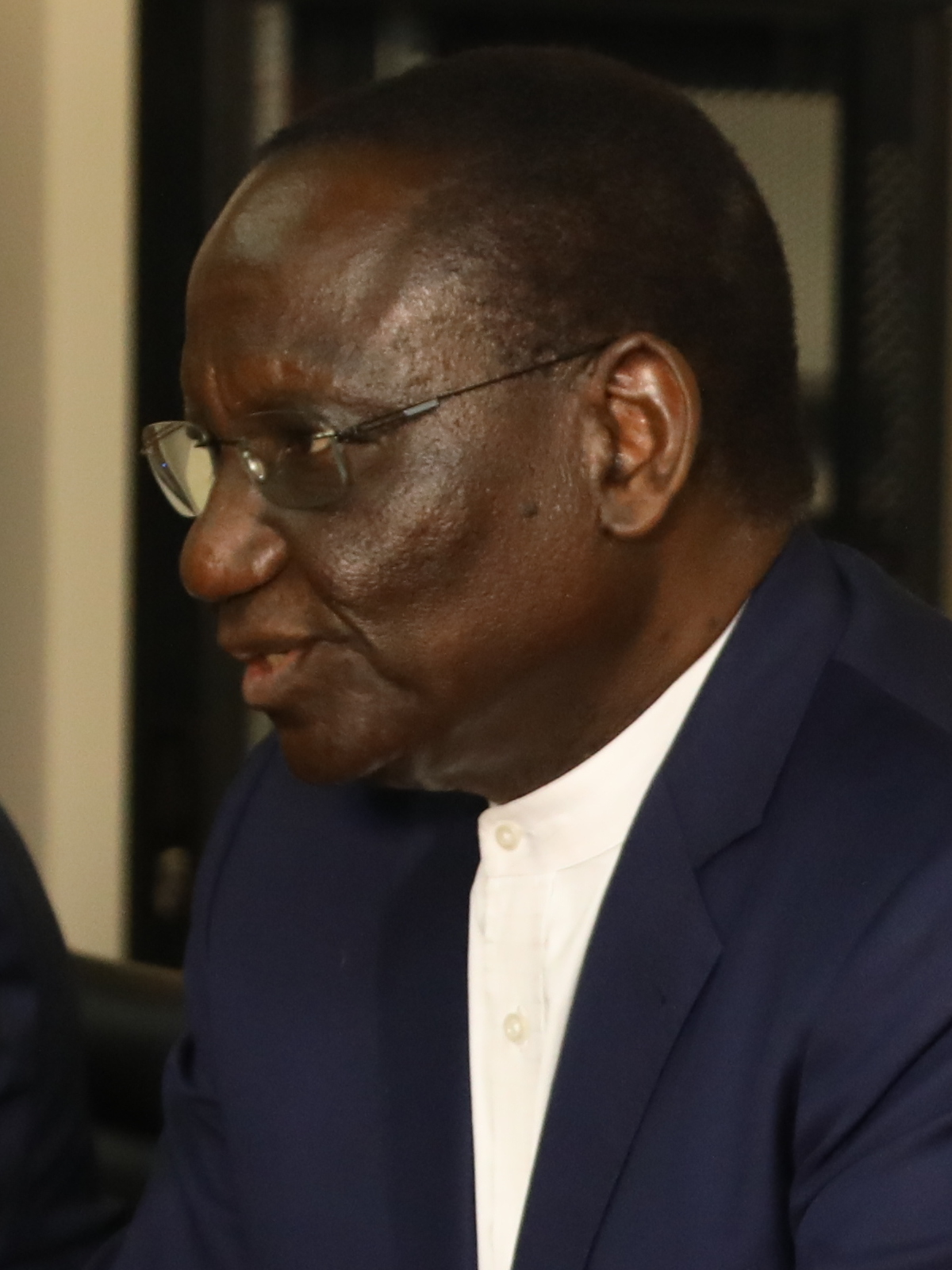

Prime Minister of the Democratic Republic of the Congo
- In office 7 September 2019 – 26 April 2021
- President: Félix Tshisekedi
- Preceded by: Bruno Tshibala
- Succeeded by: Sama Lukonde

Personal details
- Born: 28 March 1947 (age 79) Katanga Province, Belgian Congo (now Haut-Katanga Province, Democratic Republic of the Congo)
- Education: Lovanium University

Sylvestre Ilunga Ilunkamba (born 28 March 1947) is a Congolese politician who was appointed as the Prime Minister of the Democratic Republic of the Congo in May 2019, formally establishing his government in August 2019. He has had a long political career going back to the 1970s, having held a number of ministerial cabinet posts, and was previously a professor at the University of Kinshasa since 1979. Ilunga has also been the secretary general of Congo's national railway company. He has a reputation as an experienced public servant and technocrat, as well as an ally of former president Joseph Kabila.

== Early life and career ==
Sylvestre Ilunga was born in 1947 in the Katanga Province (today Haut-Katanga Province since the 2015 partition). He hails from the Luba ethnic group of Katanga. Ilunga worked as an economics professor at the University of Kinshasa since 1979. Ilunga entered politics in 1970 and held various government offices throughout the 1980s and 1990s, notably the cabinet posts of Minister of Planning (1990) and Minister of Finance (1990–1991) under the regime of Mobutu Sese Seko. After the fall of the Mobutu regime, Ilunga left the country and established a mining company in South Africa in 1993. He would return to the DRC a decade later. Since the 1990s he has largely been in retirement, except for being appointed in 2014 as the head of the SNCC, the national railway company of DR Congo. He was an economic advisor to the young President Joseph Kabila early in his term and oversaw the implementation of World Bank and IMF mandated reforms, including the privatisation of some government assets.

== Prime minister ==
On 20 May 2019, at the age of 72, he was designated as the Prime Minister of the Democratic Republic of the Congo in a deal negotiated by President Félix Tshisekedi and the Common Front for Congo ruling coalition in the country's parliament, who were allied with Tshisekedi's predecessor Joseph Kabila. Since the December 2018 general election the former opposition leader had been in negotiations with the Kabila-allied parties to nominate a Prime Minister, which had secured a majority in the election. Other potential candidates included mining executive Albert Yuma, finance minister Henri Yav Mulang, and former national security advisor Jean Mbuyu were suggested but were rejected by the President for different reasons. Nkulu Mitumba Kilombo, a member of the DRC's Constitutional Court, and Jean Nyembo Shabani, the former head of the Central Bank of Zaire, suggested Ilunga.

President Tshisekedi and the parliament agreed to form a new government on July 27, 2019, more than six months after the 2018 election, beginning Ilunga's formal nomination for Prime Minister. Ilunga's new cabinet included 65 members, including 48 ministers and 17 vice-ministers, out of which 42 posts went to the Common Front for Congo (coalition of pro-Kabila parties) and 23 for Heading for Change (President Tshisekedi's alliance). Negotiations between Kabila and Tshisekedi had stalled over who would control the six "sovereign ministries" listed in the DRC's constitution—Finance, Defense, Budget, Justice, Interior, and Foreign Affairs. The new cabinet was formally established in late August 2019.

On 28 January 2021, the National Assembly passed a motion of no confidence in Ilunga's cabinet, effectively forcing its resignation. The vote was boycotted by the pro-Kabila coalition, and followed the removal of the Assembly speaker in December 2020.

Political offices
| Preceded by Bruno Tshibala | Prime Minister of the Democratic Republic of the Congo; 2019–2021 | Succeeded by Sama Lukonde |
