= Tilwezembe =

Copper & cobalt mine

- Location within Democratic Republic of the Congo
- Location: Lualaba Province, Democratic Republic of the Congo; 10°47′58″S 25°41′32″E
- Products: Copper, Cobalt
- Closed: 2008 (officially)
- Company: Glencore (75%); Gécamines (25%)
- Website: www.katangamining.com

Tilwezembe is an open-pit copper and cobalt mine in Lualaba Province of the Democratic Republic of the Congo owned by Katanga Mining, a subsidiary of Glencore. Officially, Glencore has shuttered the mine, but the site is still being used by artisinal miners.

== History ==
The mine covers an area of 7.64 square kilometres (2.95 sq mi). It has an indicated nine million tonnes of ore with 1.89% copper and 0.60% cobalt. Mining in the Tilwezambe pit has taken place off and on since 1999. At first this was done by the state-owned Gécamines using contract labor.

In March 2004, Dan Gertler International and Beny Steinmetz Global founded a firm named Global Enterprises Corporate (GEC). In 2004 GEC and Gécamines agreed to rehabilitate and operate the Kananga and Tilwezembe mines. The deal was ratified by presidential decree. A joint venture of Katanga Mining (75%) and Gécamines (25%), named DRC Copper and Cobalt Project SARL (DCP SARL) began mining in 2007. In November 2008, Katanga Mining said they had temporarily suspended mining and ore processing at the Kolwezi concentrator due to the depressed price of cobalt.

== Activity since official closure ==
Around 2010, after the mine was officially shuttered, artisanal miners took over. These miners work with technical support from the Service d’Assistance et d’Encadrement du Small Scale Mining (Small-scale-mining technical assistance and training service - SAESSCAM) and are organised by the Maadini Kwa Kilimo Cooperative (CMKK).

=== Working conditions ===
Working conditions for artisanal miners are appalling, and child labour is common.

Miners sell their ore to the Lebanese company Misa Mining, who has a monopoly on the ore. According to miners at Tilwezembe, miners are not allowed to take ore off-site, under threat of physical violence and imprisonment. Misa Mining resells the ore to the Lebanese Bazano Group.

Misa Mining controls testing of the ore to determine cobalt and copper content, and an investigation in 2011-2012 found evidence that they systematically undervalue the metal content and did not honestly measured the weight of the ore.

Sixty miners died during 2011, making Tilwezembe one of the most dangerous mines in the world. Miners report that Misa Mining covers up the accidents by burying the dead in secret without allowing families to recover their relatives' bodies.

An April 2012 BBC Panorama investigation filmed conditions at the mine, finding some workers there as young as 10. In response to the allegations, Glencore denied any association with the operations on their property, claiming that they make efforts to avoid processing material sourced from artisanal mining.

=== Revolt ===
On December 24 and 25, 2011 miners revolted. A local NGO reported that protestors demanded an end to manipulation of the ore grading, fair monetary exchange rates, and an end to secret burials of dead miners. Police arrested eleven leaders of the miners' revolt, later releasing seven.

== See also ==
- Kamoto mine
- Kananga Mine
