= Samy Badibanga =

Congolese politician (born 1962)

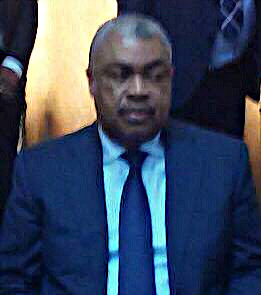

Prime Minister of the Democratic Republic of the Congo
- In office 17 November 2016 – 18 May 2017
- President: Joseph Kabila
- Preceded by: Augustin Matata Ponyo
- Succeeded by: Bruno Tshibala

Personal details
- Born: 12 September 1962 (age 64) Léopoldville, Congo-Léopoldville (now Kinshasa, Congo-Kinshasa)
- Party: Union for Democracy and Social Progress

Samy Badibanga Ntita (born 12 September 1962) is a Congolese politician who was Prime Minister of the Democratic Republic of the Congo from November 2016 to May 2017. He was also on the ballot for the 2018 Democratic Republic of the Congo general election as a presidential candidate.

== Early life and education ==
Badibanga was born on 12 September 1962 in Kinshasa (Léopoldville), Republic of the Congo. He graduated from the Higher Institute of Human Sciences in Geneva in 1986, then the School of the High Council of the Diamond (Hoge Raad voor Diamant) in Antwerp and the International Gemological Institute of Antwerp.

== Career ==
=== Professional ===
His career began in 1986 when he became a managing director of SOCODAM SPRL. He also became the director and managing director of SAMEX TRADING SPRL in 1995.

He later became a consultant for BHP Billiton from 2005 to 2010, participating in the introduction of the company in the country, particularly in partnerships with public enterprises. In 2006, he created the Federation of Explorers and Extractors (FEE) in the country to promote good governance in natural resources management. He was also a senior lecturer at iPAD DRC meetings in the mining sector from 2005 to 2009.

=== Political ===
Badibanga is an honoury member of the Union for Democracy and Social Progress since 1994.

Badibanga was closely associated with opposition leader Étienne Tshisekedi before the November 2011 presidential election and was elected national deputy the same year. Tshisekedi, alleging that the official results were fraudulent, ordered the newly elected UDPS deputies, Badibanga among them, to boycott the National Assembly. Badibanga took his seat anyway, becoming President of the UDPS and Allies Parliamentary Group and thereby creating a rift between himself and Tshisekedi.

In October 2016, Badibanga participated in a dialogue between the government and some elements of the opposition regarding the timing of the next election. The dialogue resulted in an agreement for Kabila to remain in office beyond the normal end of his term (December 2016) to allow time for the organization of the next election, which was delayed until April 2018, while also stipulating that a representative of the opposition would serve as Prime Minister during the period leading up to the election. President Joseph Kabila then appointed Badibanga as Prime Minister on 17 November 2016. In doing so, he bypassed a more prominent representative of the opposition who also participated in the dialogue, Vital Kamerhe, contrary to general expectations. More radical elements of the opposition, associated with Étienne Tshisekedi, opposed any deal with the government allowing Kabila to remain in office. Shortly after his appointment, he was accused of being a Congolese-Belgian dual citizen by Olivier Kamitatu, the former president of the National Assembly, which is forbidden in the DRC. On 19 December 2016, he formed his cabinet.

Badibanga resigned in April 2017 after Kabila announced that he planned to appoint a new prime minister from the opposition. Kabila appointed Bruno Tshibala as Prime Minister on 7 April.

On 27 July 2019, Badibanga was elected vice-president of the upper house of the DRC parliament, The Senate.

== Personal life ==
He is the father of Béni Badibanga, a professional footballer.

== See also ==
- List of heads of government of the Democratic Republic of the Congo
- Government of the Democratic Republic of the Congo
- Politics of the Democratic Republic of the Congo

Political offices
Preceded by Augustin Matata Ponyo	Prime Minister of the Congo-Kinshasa; 2016–2017	Succeeded by Bruno Tshibala
