= Bruno Tshibala =

Congolese politician

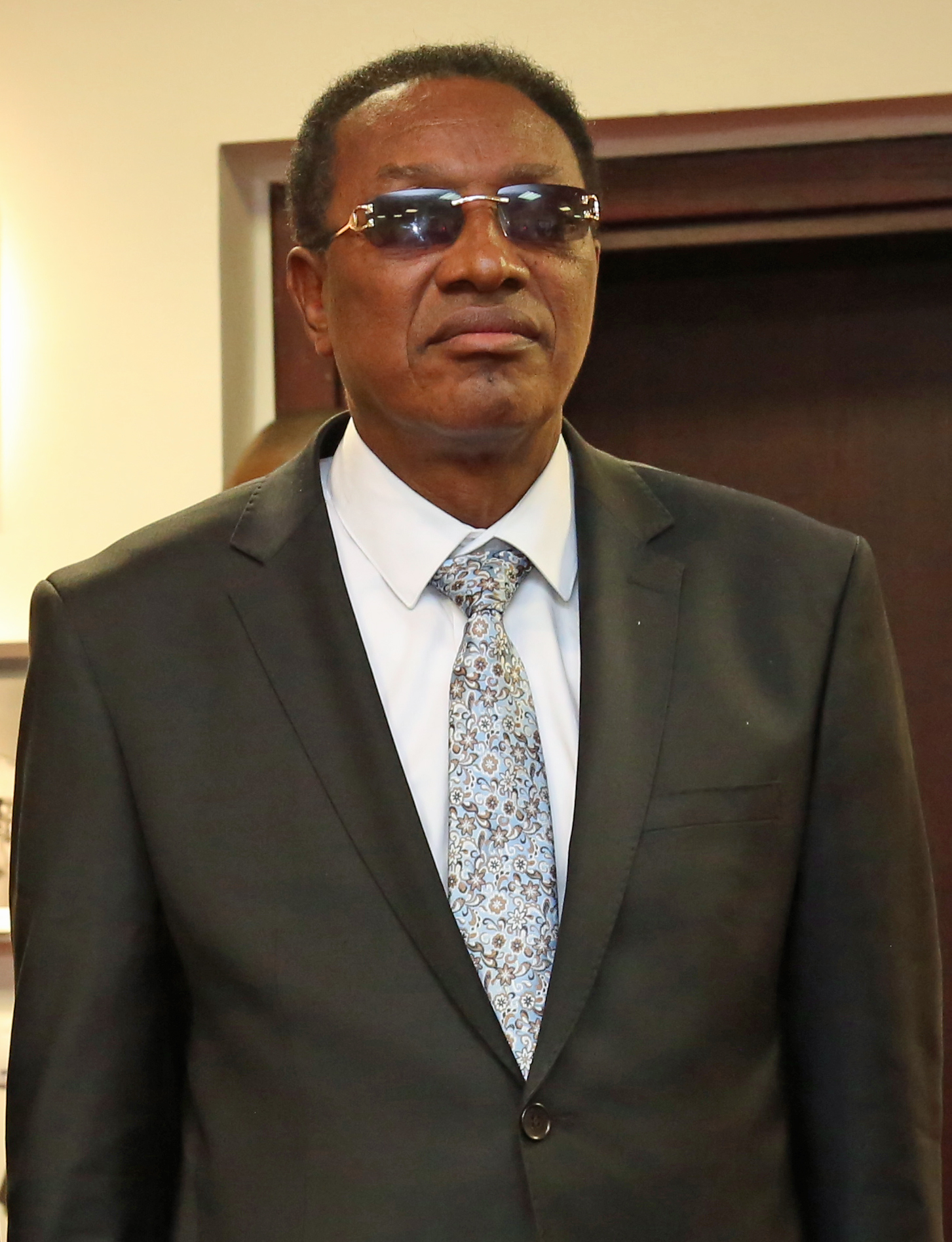

25th Prime Minister of the Democratic Republic of the Congo
- In office 18 May 2017 – 7 September 2019
- President: Joseph Kabila; Félix Tshisekedi
- Deputy: Léonard She Okitundu
- Preceded by: Samy Badibanga
- Succeeded by: Sylvestre Ilunga Ilukamba

Personal details
- Born: 20 February 1956 (age 70) Gandajika, Belgian Congo (now Democratic Republic of the Congo)
- Party: Union for Democracy and Social Progress
- Education: Marien Ngouabi University

Bruno Tshibala Nzenze (born 20 February 1956) is a Congolese politician who served as Prime Minister of the Democratic Republic of the Congo from 2017 to 2019.

== Education ==
He finished primary and secondary education in Lubumbashi and studied law at the Marien Ngouabi University in Brazzaville.

== Political career ==
He began his political career while still a student in April 1980 at the age of 24 when he joined a leftist political party in Zaire during the rule of Mobutu Sese Seko. In December 1980, he, along with 13 parliamentarians, wrote a letter to ask President Mobutu for democratic reforms while the country was still under the one-party system.

Tshibala joined the Union for Democracy and Social Progress (UPDS), the main opposition party in the DRC, and eventually became its spokesman and the deputy secretary-general. On 9 October 2016, he was arrested at N'djili International Airport when he was about to board a plane to Brussels and was held at Makala Central Prison. The country's Attorney General accused him of organising demonstrations on 19 and 20 September 2016 in Kinshasa. He was later granted a provisional release on 29 November 2016.

The protests were related to the government's delay of the next election, which was supposed to be held at the end of 2016. After an agreement was reached between President Joseph Kabila and Congo's conference of Catholic bishops on 31 December 2016 to organise a transitional government that would prepare for the election, the opposition could not agree on a candidate to become its prime minister. Tshibala, who was expelled from the UPDS after disagreeing with the choice of Félix Tshisekedi as its new leader, ended up being chosen by Kabila for the role. On 7 April 2017, President Joseph Kabila appointed him as Prime Minister during a nationwide televised address. He took office on 18 May 2017. Tshibala said after his appointment that organizing the country's next general election was his priority.

Tshibala led the DR Congo delegation at the Beijing Summit of the Forum on China-Africa Cooperation in September 2018, where he met with President Xi Jinping of the People's Republic of China. They discussed the relations between the two countries, and Tshibala expressed the DRC's support for the Belt and Road Initiative.

In 2019, Tshibala made a bid to serve as a DRC Senator, but lost the Senate election on 15 March.

Political offices
Preceded by Samy Badibanga	Prime Minister of the Democratic Republic of the Congo; 2017–2019	Succeeded by Sylvestre Ilunga
