= KOV mine =

Copper mine

- Location within Democratic Republic of the Congo
- Location: Lualaba, Democratic Republic of the Congo; 10°42′48″S 25°25′07″E
- Products: Copper; Cobalt
- Company: Glencore (75%); Gécamines (25%)

The KOV mine is a large, active open pit copper and cobalt mine near Kolwezi in Lualaba Province in the Democratic Republic of the Congo. The site contains some of the highest grade copper ore of any mine in the world. The mine is also one of the world's largest Cobalt producers.

It is named after three of the five orebodies which make up the mine: Kamoto-East, Oliveira, and Virgule (the other two being Variante and FNSR). The mine is run by Kamoto Copper Company, a joint venture between Glencore (75%) and Gécamines (25%).

The deposits began to be exploited in 1960 by Gécamines up until 2000, when operations stopped due to flooding. Dewatering started in 2006, with mine operations restarting in March 2007.

In March 2016, one of the walls of the mine collapsed, killing seven employees.

During the fourth quarter of 2017, the mine produced 433,169 tons of ore, resulting in 9,459 tons of copper.

In 2019, a second collapse at the mine killed at least 41 artisanal miners working at the site. The number of miners killed was later increased to 43 as more bodies were uncovered.

== See also ==
- Mining industry of the Democratic Republic of the Congo
