= Louis Reijtenbagh =

Dutch businessman and investor (born 1946)

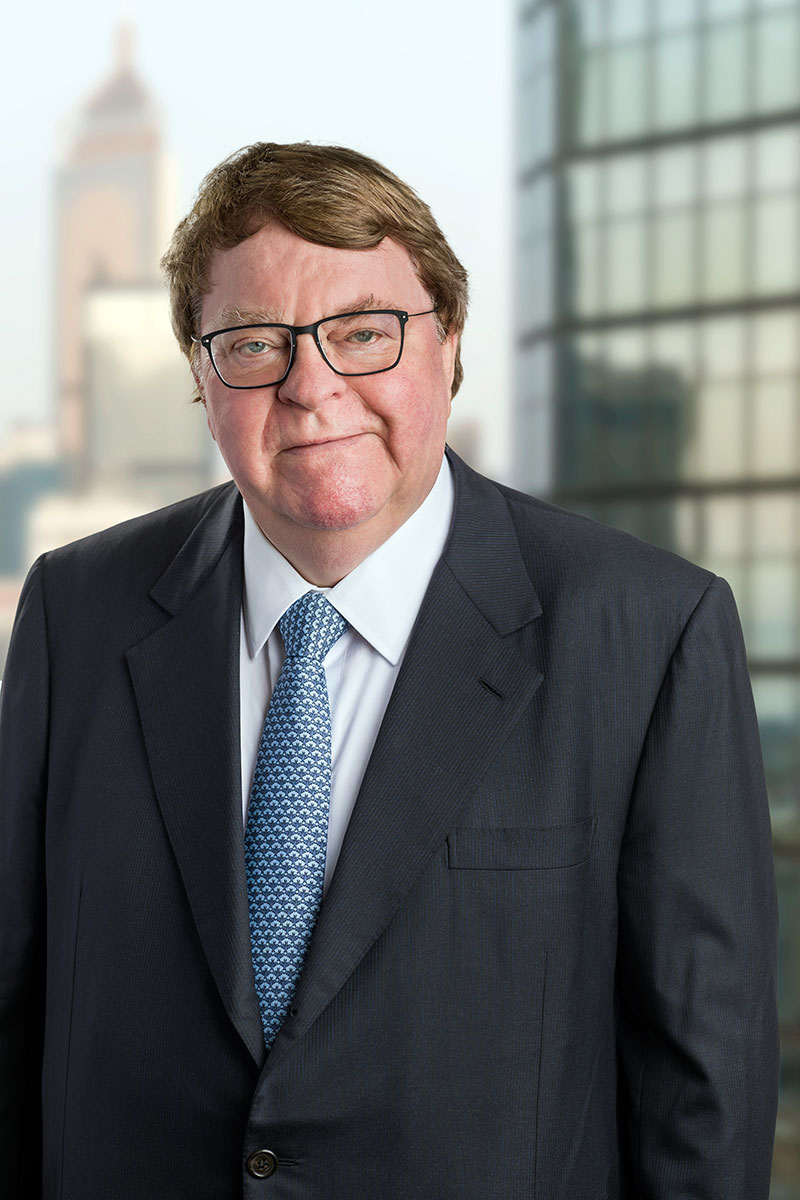
- Born: July 18, 1946 (age 80); Den Ham
- Education: Radboud University Nijmegen (the Netherlands), Radboud Un.: Notable alumni
- Occupations: Founder and chief executive officer of The Plaza Group

Louis Reijtenbagh (born July 18, 1946) is a Dutch businessman and investor, as well as a retired general practitioner. He is the founder and chief executive officer of The Plaza Group ("Plaza"), a family office exclusively formed to manage the capital of its founder and his direct family members.

== Early life and career ==
Reijtenbagh was born in Den Ham, Overijssel. He graduated from the Radboud University in Nijmegen, formerly Catholic University Nijmegen (the Netherlands), in 1975 with a degree in general medicine. Reijtenbagh was awarded a scholarship under the Fulbright Program to study cardiology at Northwestern University in Chicago. During his studies Reijtenbagh voluntarily worked for the Acworth Leprosy Hospital in Mumbai. Reijtenbagh ran a general care practice in Almelo, Overijssel, from 1975 until 1990.

Reijtenbagh has always had an interest in the financial markets. From his days as a student he has been actively involved and his investments have primarily focused on global macro and discretionary long/short investing. He founded Plaza in 1985 in the Netherlands to invest across various asset classes. Reijtenbagh manages all activities since 1995 from Plaza's headquarters in Monaco.

His name was included on a proxy card for Big Sky Energy which had interests on the eastern shore of the Caspian Sea in Kazakhstan through a stake held in KoZhan, which is a petroleum firm developing the Morskoye, Karatal, Dauletally fields in the Atyrau Region, by the subsidiary Big Sky Energy Kazakhstan until Kazakhstan government ruled against Big Sky Energy and for the interests of Eurasian Natural Resources Corporation (ENRC), which has been restructured within the Kazakh Trio Alexander Mashkevich, Patokh Chodiev and Alijan Ibragimov controlled Eurasian Resources Group (ERG) which controlled KoZhan from 2010 to 2015 but is now controlled by the Chen Huanlong associated Chinese firm Geo-Jade Petroleum Corporation.

== Personal life ==
Reijtenbagh moved from the Netherlands to Monaco in 1995. He is married and has two sons.

== Art Collector ==
Reijtenbagh is an avid art collector whose collection includes and has included works by Rembrandt van Rijn, Vincent van Gogh, Pablo Picasso, Claude Monet, Kees van Dongen, Giorgio de Chirico, Edgar Degas and Pierre Bonnard, among others. In September 2008, Reijtenbagh sold a famous work of art - Gerrit Adriaensz Berckheyde's "The bend in the Herengracht" - to the Rijksmuseum in Amsterdam for an undisclosed sum. The work has been displayed in a loan exhibition at the National Gallery of Art in Washington, D.C.

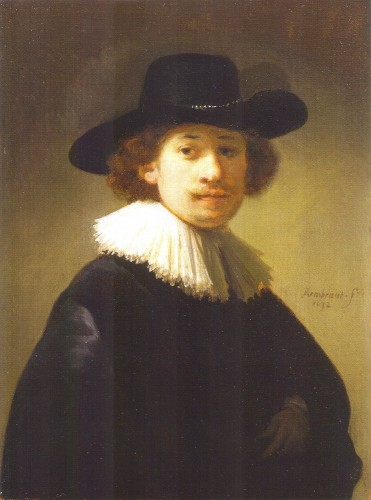
Rembrandt in Reijtenbagh's collection

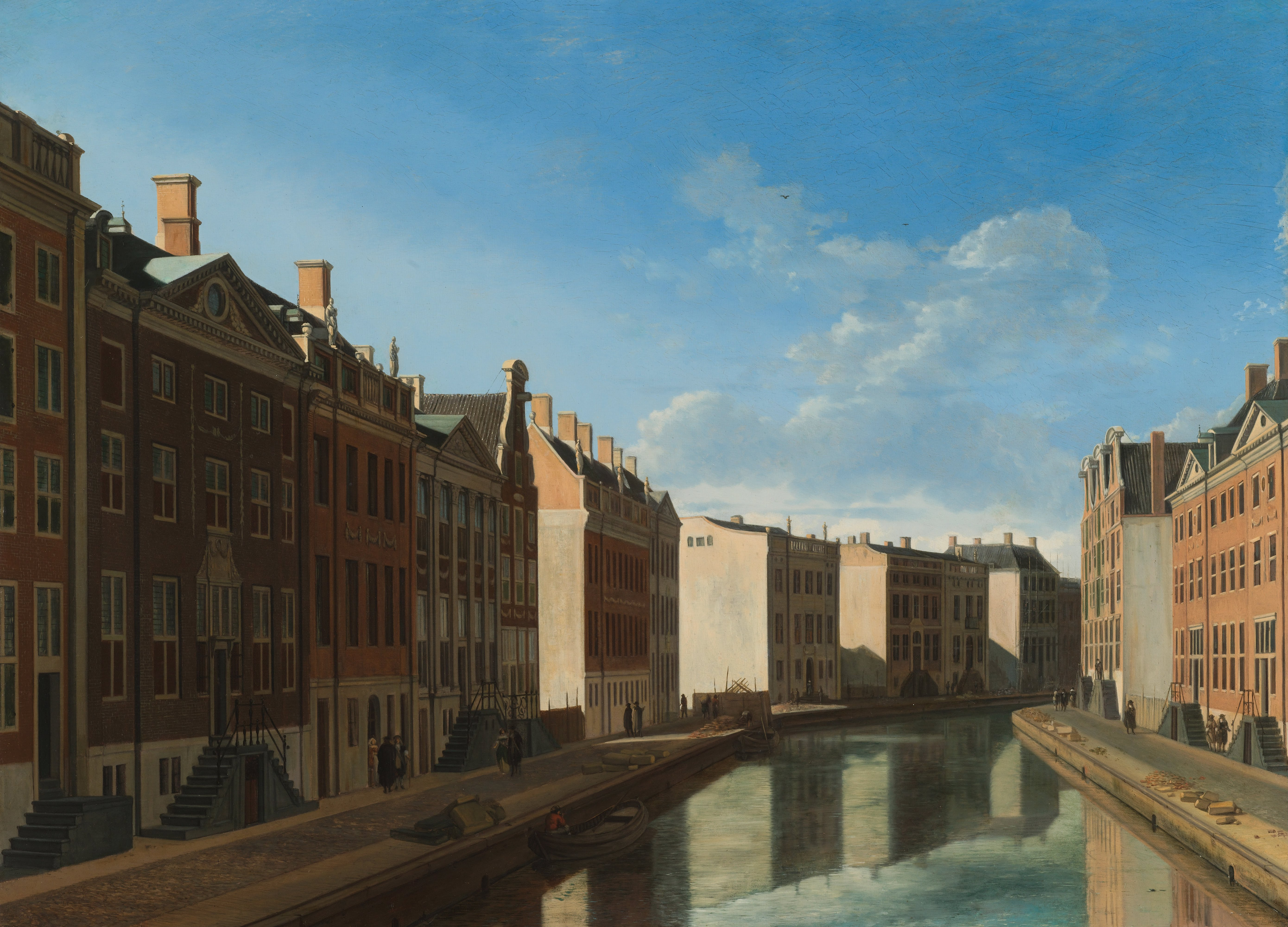
Berckheyde formerly in Reijtenbagh's collection

== Controversy ==
In March 2009, Credit Suisse's Strategic Partners investment advisory group sued Reijtenbagh for breach of a credit agreement, alleging amongst others fraudulent misrepresentation and improper transfer of assets by Reijtenbagh and others. Reijtenbagh and Credit Suisse Strategic Partners settled the matter two months later in May 2009.

In April 2009, JPMorgan Chase sued Reijtenbagh alleging Reijtenbagh defaulted on his obligations under a credit agreement as a result of the lawsuit filed by Credit Suisse Strategic Partners. The litigation was based on a material adverse change (MAC) in circumstances. Reijtenbagh reached a settlement with JP Morgan Chase in September 2009.

In October 2018, the Court of Antwerp approved a settlement between Reijtenbagh and the Public Prosecutor's Office of Antwerp (Belgium). The settlement is a legislated arrangement that provides a final and complete resolution of the dispute that concerned domicile-related tax and ancillary issues which allegedly occurred over a decade ago. The settlement did not constitute any conviction, nor any finding or admission of guilt, wrongdoing or misconduct whatsoever. Under the approved settlement, the Public Prosecutor's Office has discontinued the entire prosecution and dismissed all charges with prejudice. Accordingly, Reijtenbagh has been cleared of all charges and allegations.
