= Alferon Management =

British management company

Alferon Management Limited of London is a management company responsible for running the International Mineral Resources (IMR) in Kazakhstan. International Mineral Resources (IMR) is a Zurich-based holding subsidiary of the Eurasian Natural Resources Corporation (ENRC), one of the world’s largest private mining and metals group owned by three Kazakh businessmen Alexander Mashkevich, Patokh Chodiev (or Shodiev) and Alijan Ibragimov (or Alidzhon Ibragimov). Alferon Management Limited of London is a mining acquisition company that has acquired many mining operations in different countries such as Zambia, the Democratic Republic of Congo, Indonesia, Russia, in Kosovo, and other countries that lack corporate governance.

== Management ==
Alexander Mashkevich, Patokh Chodiev and Alijan Ibragimov, better known as the Troika or Trio, are the owners of Eurasian Natural Resources Corporation (ENRC), International Mineral Resources (IMR) and Alferon Management. The Trio hired well known metallurgic expert, Dr. Johannes Sittard to head Alferon Management, International Mineral Resources, Eurasian Natural Resources Corporation (known as Eurasian Group), Arduina Holdings and preside over J&W Investments, a Swiss mining company owned by Alferon. Before joining Alferon, Sittard was world steel magnate Lakshmi Mittal’s right-hand man.

After working for Mittal for several years, Sittard confessed that Mittal had paid the Trio US $100 million in order to facilitate business in Kazakhstan.

== Acquisitions ==
=== in Kosovo ===
After much controversy, Alferon Management acquired in 2006 Ferronikeli Complex LLC, a nickel plant in Drenas Kosovo. The controversy behind the acquisition stemmed from Alferon receiving the approval on the acquisition from the Kosovo Trust Agency (KTA) despite the fact that they were not the highest bidder; US- Albanian company, Adi Nickel was the highest bidder offering 49.5 million Euros.

Ferki Karaxha, the head of Ferronikeli trade union, stated that since Adi-Nickel won the first tender, it was no fair to declare IMR a provisional winner.. He also stated that he "has always been against the sale of the company and is convinced that the sale is a great crime against the national economy".

The sale agreement also includes an investment commitment from IMR-Alferon of €20 million, plus a guarantee to employ at least 1,000 people at Ferronikeli.

Deputy Special Representative of the United Nations Secretary General (DSRSG), Joachim Ruecker, said the sale sent “a very strong signal to international investors”. Mr Ruecker added: “Kosovo is a stable and mature society, which welcomes international investment.”
