= Naseeb Apna Apna =

Naseeb Apna Apna (transl. One's Destiny) may refer to:

- Naseeb Apna Apna (1970 film), a Pakistani film
- Naseeb Apna Apna (1986 film), an Indian Hindi-language drama film starring Rishi Kapoor, Farah Naz and Amrish Puri

== See also ==
- Naseeb (disambiguation)
- Apna (disambiguation)
