= Eurasian Resources Group =

Luxembourgish company

Eurasian Resources Group S.à r.l.
- Type: Société à responsabilité limitée
- Industry: Metals and Mining
- Founded: 2013
- Headquarters: Luxembourg
- Key people: Shukhrat Ibragimov (Group CEO and Chairman of the Board of Directors)
- Products: 2022 Production Data: Ferroalloys (1.5 million tonnes) Iron ore products (11.1 million tonnes) Alumina (1.3 million tonnes) Aluminium (249 thousand tonnes) Copper metal (100 thousand tonnes) Copper concentrate (91 thousand tonnes) Cobalt hydroxide (23 thousand tonnes) Steam coal (29.9 million tonnes) Electricity (15.4 GWh) Logistics (transported) (45.3 thousand tonnes).
- Number of employees: More than 68,000 (2022)
- Website: www.frontiermine.africa

Eurasian Resources Group (ERG) S.à r.l. is a large mining and raw materials supplier with operations in Kazakhstan, Brazil and Central Africa. In its current form, the company began in December 2013 after it acquired the Eurasian Natural Resources Corporation (previously a public limited company), which was delisted from the London Stock Exchange and Kazakhstan Stock Exchange. Major shareholders of the company include the Republic of Kazakhstan (40%), Alexander Mashkevitch, Patokh Chodiev and the heirs of Alijan Ibragimov.

== History ==
The Eurasian Natural Resources Corporation (ENRC) was taken private in 2013 amid falling share price and ongoing investigation from the UK Serious Fraud Office. In August 2023, after latest review of the investigation, the UK Serious Fraud Office concluded that it has insufficient admissible evidence to prosecute, and closed the case.

At the beginning of 2014 the company restructured, introducing new corporate governance and compliance policies and new management. Projects included cobalt mining in Africa and an expanded aluminum plant in Kazakhstan.

In mid 2024 ERG appointed Shukhrat Ibragimov as its new CEO. The former CEO of ERG, Benedikt Sobotka, stepped down after ten years in this role.

== Operations ==
Eurasian Resources Group owns fully integrated mining, processing, energy production, logistics and marketing operations. With a product portfolio in steelmaking materials, non-ferrous and energy, it is the world's largest producer of Ferrochrome by chrome content. ERG supplies electricity in Central Asia, also being a large railway operator in the region.

In Kazakhstan, the group's major assets include: TNC Kazchrome, Sokolov Sarbai Mining Production Association (SSGPO), Aluminum of Kazakhstan (AOK), Kazakhstan Aluminum Smelter (KAS), Eurasian Energy Corporation (EEC), Shubarkol Komir and Trans Com.

In Africa, ERG owns production and development stage assets in the Democratic Republic of Congo (DRC), Zambia, Zimbabwe, South Africa, Mozambique and Mali.

In Brazil it develops the Pedra de Ferro iron ore production complex and the Porto Sul deep water port, both of which are in the State of Bahia, and the first stretch of the FIOL transcontinental railway.

Since 2014 the Group sold assets worth about US$1 billion, including zinc mines to Glencore.

In December 2025, an ongoing bidding war over the company's shares was made public by the Financial Times, who reported the rival bids placed by both the company's CEO, Shukhrat Ibragimov, and Kazakh businessman, Shakhmurat Mutalip.
