= Moscow State Institute of International Relations =

School of the Russian Ministry of Foreign Affairs

Coordinates: 55°40′20″N 37°29′13″E

- Московский государственный институт международных отношений
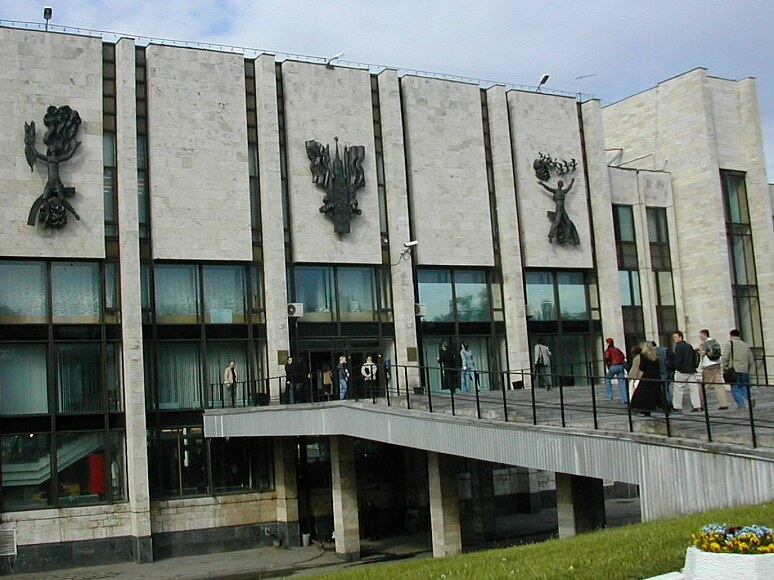
- Established: October 14, 1944; 82 years ago
- Endowment: 1.7 billion roubles (27 million euros)
- Rector: Anatoly V. Torkunov
- Academic staff: 1,254 (2019)
- Students: 9,729 (2019)
- Location: Moscow, Russia
- Website: english.mgimo.ru

The Moscow State Institute of International Relations (MGIMO) (Russian: Московский государственный институт международных отношений) is a public university located in Moscow, Russia. The institute is run by the Russian Ministry of Foreign Affairs.

MGIMO offers educational programs in 18 fields of study, including international relations and regional studies, politics, governance, diplomacy, world economy, law, journalism, foreign trade and management, energy affairs, linguistics, and environmental studies. It offers MBA and Executive MBA programs, and pre-university tutorials. According to the Guinness Book of Records, MGIMO in 2019 taught 54 full time languages during every academic term, the most in any academic institution. The university pays special attention to distance learning and digital technologies. Since 2016, MGIMO has been recording and publishing its distance courses at Coursera. As of 2020, Coursera contained 20 courses by MGIMO professors. MGIMO has integrated an LMS (Electronic Learning Management System) in the educational process. MGIMO has three campuses – in Moscow, in the Moscow Region (Odintsovo) and in Tashkent (Uzbekistan) as well as an educational centre for law studies in Geneva, Switzerland.

== History ==
MGIMO was founded on 14 October 1944 by a special decree of the Soviet Government on the basis of the recently established School of International Relations of the Lomonosov Moscow State University. The first 200 students were veterans who had fought in the Second World War.

By early 1950s, MGIMO comprised three schools, since its ancestor, the School of History and International Relations was added by the School of International Law and the School of International Economic Relations. In 1954 the Moscow Institute of Oriental Studies, the successor of the Lazarev Institute of Oriental Languages created in 1815, was integrated into MGIMO. In 1958, MGIMO incorporated one more university – of Foreign Trade. In 1969 the School of Journalism and the School of Law were added. In 1989, admission on a commercial basis started and first students from Western countries began to arrive. In the late 1980s, MGIMO became the first national university to establish its own business school that later in 2012 emerged as the School of Business and International Proficiency. 1992 saw the creation of the School of International Business and Business Administration. In 1994 MGIMO was granted university status but traditionally contains the word institute in its name. The same year saw the creation of the International Institute of Administration. The same year a Department of Politics was introduced within the School of International Relations and evolved into the separate School of Political Science in 1998.

In 2000, two educational divisions were established - Institute of Energy Policy and Diplomacy and School of Applied Economics and Commerce. In 2005, the European Studies Institute was opened on MGIMO basis. In 2011, the Institute for Foreign Economic Relations was transformed into the School of Applied Economics and Commerce. In 2013 The School of Governance and Global Affairs was launched as the first Russian school to train international students in English at bachelor's level. In 2016, MGIMO opened the Odintsovo Branch – its first campus located in the Moscow suburban area. The campus is also a home for MGIMO Gorchakov Lyceum. In 2017, the International Institute of Administration and the School of Political Science merged into the School of Governance and Politics.

According to CNN, 1,200 students, faculty, and staff of the university signed an open letter in protest of Russia's invasion of Ukraine in 2022. In March 2022, Anatoly Torkunov, MGIMO University rector, was suspended from the European University Association (EUA) following support for the 2022 Russian invasion of Ukraine by the Russian Union of Rectors (RUR). Several Western universities also suspended academic collaboration agreements with MGIMO.

== Rankings ==
University rankings

Global – Overall
- QS World: =650 (2026)

Regional – Overall
- QS Emerging Europe and Central Asia: 55 (2022)

In 2022, the university was ranked #345 in the world in the QS World University Rankings.

University rankings
National
Politics	1
Global
Politics	34
Modern Languages	101
Linguistics	101
Law and Legal Studies	151
Economics and Econometrics	251
Social Sciences and Management	261
Sociology	301
Business and Management Studies	351
Arts and Humanities	370
Think Tanks
University Affiliated	8
Best Managed	73

In Russia, MGIMO is the school that offers the best salaries to its graduates, above any other Russian university.

In recognition of its international education and research, MGIMO has been awarded «5 Stars» in the QS Stars Audit, thus becoming the first university in Russia, Central and Eastern Europe, Central Asia and amongst BRICS countries to be bestowed with this accolade. In 2022, MGIMO ranked 345th in the QS World University Rankings.

In January 2021, the Global Go To Think Tank Index Report ranked MGIMO 8th in the world in Best University Affiliated Think Tanks index, 73rd - among Best Managed Think Tanks.

== Structure ==
MGIMO comprises three campuses (Moscow, Moscow Region and Tashkent, Uzbekistan), an educational platform in Geneva for law studies, ten schools, three institutes and one business school.

=== MGIMO schools ===
- School of International Relations
- School of International Law
- School of International Economic Relations
- School of International Business and Business Administration
- School of Applied Economics and Commerce
- School of Governance and Politics
- School of Government and International Affairs
- School of International Journalism
- School of Preparatory Training
- School of Financial Economy
- School of Linguistics and Cross-cultural Communication

=== MGIMO institutes ===
- International Institute of Energy Policy and Diplomacy
- European Studies Institute
- School of Governance and Global Affairs

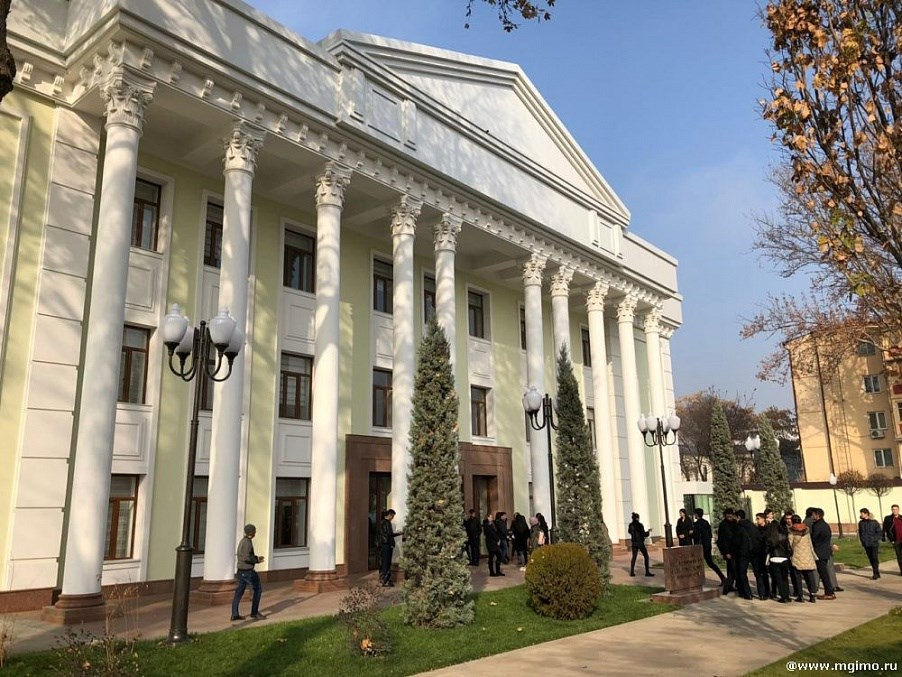
MGIMO Tashkent Campus, Uzbekistan

MGIMO became one of the first Russian universities to establish their own business school. In 2019 the advisory board of the MBA Association (AMBA) accredited the MBA and Executive MBA programs of the MGIMO Business School. The same year MGIMO joined European Foundation for Management Development (EFMD).

There are 19 corporate departments at MGIMO, e.g. of the Ministry of Agriculture of Russia, of such companies as Rosneft, Transneft, ADV Group. MGIMO cooperates as well with other Russian universities - Moscow Institute of Physics and Technology, National University of Science and Technology "MISiS", Stavropol and Kuban State Agrarian Universities:

- Department of International Military-technical Cooperation and High Technology run by the Rostec State Corporation;
- Department of Global Energy Policy and Energy Security run jointly by Rosneft Oil Company and MGIMO-based Rosneft's Centre for corporate training and development;
- Department of Foreign Economic Activities in Energy Transportation run by Transneft;
- Department of Economics and Banking Business run by Gazprombank;
- Department of International Transport Operations run jointly with Russian Railways and Ural Mining and Metallurgical company;
- Department of World Electric Power Industry, jointly with Rosseti;
- Department of Economic and Antimonopoly Regulation run by the Federal Antimonopoly Service of Russia;
- Department “ADV — Information Technology and Artificial Intelligence”;
- Department of World Commodity Markets, jointly with Non-Commercial Partnership for Mining Industry Development Assistance and LCC “Karakan Invest”;
- Department of Trade and Trade Regulations;
- Department of International Complex Problems of Nature Management and Ecology;
- Department of Economic Policy and Public-Private Partnership (sponsored by the Public-Private Partnership Development Centre and IKEA);
- Department of Corporate Security, jointly with PJSC MMC Norilsk Nickel;
- Department of Global Processes in the Field of Subsurface Resources, jointly with Rosgeo;
- Department of Regional Management and National Policy;
- Department of Entrepreneurship and Corporate Governance (corporate department of “Business Russia” party);
- Department of International Agrarian Markets and Foreign Economic Activity in the Agro-Industrial Complex (corporate department of the Ministry of Agriculture of the Russian Federation);
- Department of the Ministry of the Housing and Utility Sector of the Moscow Region “Urban Infrastructure Management and Territorial Development”;
- Department of Asset Management (in accordance with the cooperation agreement with Region Group company).

== Dual degree programs ==
A priority of MGIMO international policy is the development of bilateral and multilateral international relations, and the promotion of educational and scientific exchange. In 2019 it had cooperation agreements with more than 170 foreign partners from 57 countries – universities, diplomatic academies, institutes, and research centers. The university had more than 30 dual/triple degree programs with universities of Europe and America, undergraduate and postgraduate programs in English, French, Italian, German and Chinese.

After the 2022 Russian invasion of Ukraine, the Fletcher School at Tufts University announced it will break off its academic relationship with the school. Similarly, Paris Institute of Political Studies (Sciences Po Paris), the University of Reading and the University of St Andrews among others, announced suspending all academic collaboration with MGIMO.

== Science and research ==
The university faculty represents professors and teachers. Each year MGIMO has had special courses by foreign visiting professors, among them Robert Legvold and William Wohlforth.

MGIMO has granted honorary doctorate degrees to foreign politicians, public experts, diplomats and scholars, working in the field of international relations and foreign policy among which President of France (2007–12) Nikolas Sarkozy, President of the European Commission (1999–2004) Romano Prodi, President of the French Institute of International Affairs Thierry de Montbrial, Prince of Monaco Albert II, President of Chile Veronica Michelle Bachelet Jeria and others.

The Institute of International Studies of MGIMO comprises 12 research centers and accumulates the scientific and intellectual output of the university. Early the research structures were presented by Problem Research Laboratory for System Analysis of International Relations (1976-1990), Center for International Studies (1990-2004), and the Research Coordination Council for International Studies (2004–09). These 12 centers now cover a range of international issues ranging from developments in the post-Soviet space to disarmament and conflict settlement, from the Asia Pacific to Middle East.

MGIMO is member of international organizations, including

- International Studies Association (ISA)
- European Consortium for Political Research (ECPR)
- Association of Professional Schools of International Affairs (APSIA)
- European Association for International Education (EAIE)
- Council for Advancement and Support of Education

MGIMO contributes to the Russian Political Science Association, the United Nations Association of Russia (RISA), a number of Russian foundations and non-governmental organizations, as well as leading global think tanks.

MGIMO University is the founding member of the Russian International Studies Association.

== Language studies ==
MGIMO teaches 56 languages; a Guinness world record.

- Afrikaans
- Albanian
- Amharic
- Armenian
- Arabic
- Azerbaijani
- Bengali
- Bulgarian
- Chinese
- Croatian
- Czech
- Danish
- Dari
- Dutch
- English (Mandatory)
- Estonian
- Finnish
- French
- German
- Greek
- Hebrew
- Hindi
- Hungarian
- Indonesian
- Italian
- Japanese
- Kazakh
- Korean
- Kyrgyz
- Lao
- Latin
- Latvian
- Lithuanian
- Malay
- Moldovan
- Mongolian
- Norwegian
- Pashto
- Persian
- Polish
- Portuguese
- Romanian
- Russian
- Serbian
- Slovak
- Spanish
- Swahili
- Swedish
- Tajik
- Thai
- Turkish
- Turkmen
- Ukrainian
- Urdu
- Uzbek
- Vietnamese

== Student life ==
MGIMO provides a choice of opportunities for students’ social life. The Cultural Center provides creative classes and events, in Ballroom Dance, Modern Dance, the choir (PROXENOS)Proxenos. MGIMO Choir., the orchestra (SYMPHONY), a Literary and Poetry Club, the MGIMO Theatre, and a Painting Club.

The Volunteer Center, established in 2011, provides training for students to practice their skills at large international events. MGIMO volunteers have worked at the FIFA World Cup 2018, the XXII Olympic Games and the XI Paralympic Games. MGIMO foreign students organize national clubs inside the International Students Association.

There is a number of other student clubs including Student Union, Moscow International Model United Nations (MIMUN) (in 2017 was named after Vitaly Churkin), Student Science Society (includes Business Club, Debate Club, Germanic Studies Club, etc.), Russian Association of Public Relations Students

== Notable alumni ==
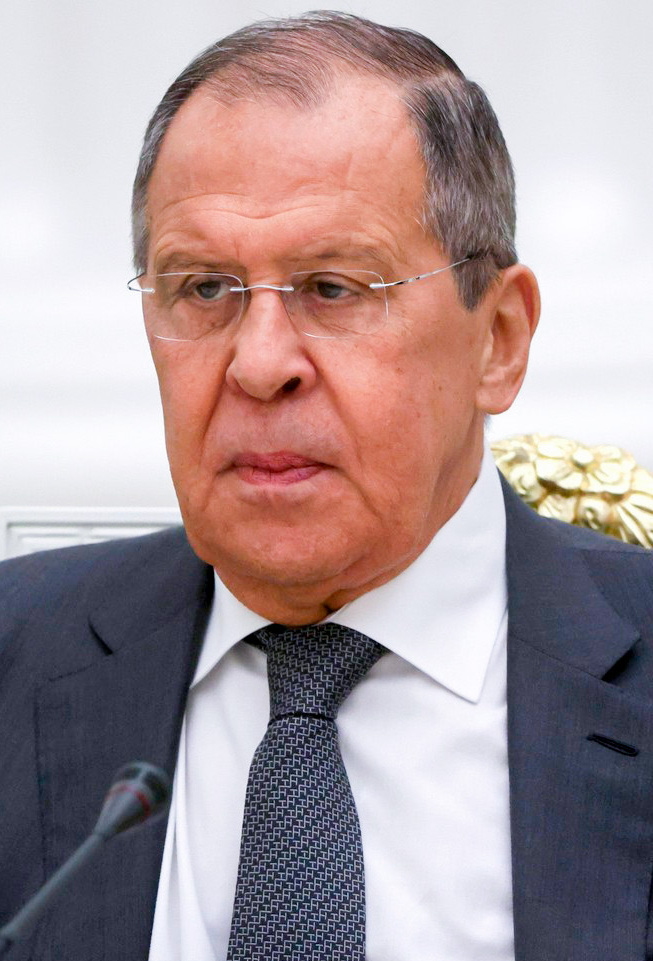
Sergei Lavrov

- Ilham Aliyev, President of Azerbaijan
- Gankhuurai Battungalag, Mongolian diplomat
- Irina Bokova, former Director-General of UNESCO
- Kassym-Jomart Tokayev, President of Kazakhstan
- Eduard Kukan, Foreign Minister of Slovakia and Special Envoy of the United Nations for the Balkans
- Miroslav Lajčák, Minister of Foreign and European Affairs of the Slovak Republic
- Maroš Šefčovič, Vice-President of the European Commission
- Kirsan Ilyumzhinov, FIDE President
- Sergei Lavrov, Russian Minister of Foreign Affairs
- Yuri Fedotov, executive director of the UNODC
- Hang Chuon Naron, Minister of Education of Cambodia
- Khemmani Pholsena, Laos Minister of Industry and Commerce
- Felix Vulis, CEO of Eurasian Natural Resources Corporation
- Nasib Piriyev, Azerbaijani entrepreneur

Libor Sečka, Czech diplomat

Business personalities in Russia, who studied at MGIMO, include billionaires Alisher Usmanov, Dmitry Mazepin, Patokh Chodiev and Vladimir Potanin.

In 1991, MGIMO Alumni Association was founded to support the community of MGIMO graduates. In 2006, the MGIMO Board of Trustees was established with Sergey Lavrov, Minister of Foreign Affairs, as its chairman. The trustees are Russian high-ranking officials and public figures, mostly MGIMO alumni, as well as Russian and foreign leaders of business and philanthropic community (such as Ingvar Kamprad, the IKEA founder, and Frederik Paulsen, chairman of the board of directors of Ferring Pharmaceuticals, Honorary Consul of the Russian Federation in Lausanne). MGIMO was the first university in Russia to establish an endowment fund, it is the biggest university endowment fund in Russia. It provides support to students projects and their foreign internships.
