= Geneva International Model United Nations =

Non-governmental organization

- Geneva International Model United Nations
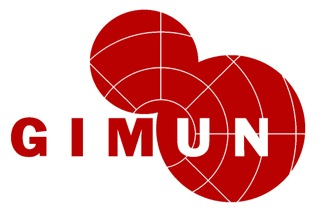
- Abbreviation: GIMUN
- Formation: 1999
- Type: Non-Governmental Organization (NGO)
- Location: Geneva, Switzerland
- Official languages: English and French
- Affiliations: UN ECOSOC Special Consultative Status
- Website: www.gimun.org

Geneva International Model United Nations
- Partners: Graduate Institute of International and Development Studies, University of Geneva, Swiss Federal Department of Foreign Affairs, United Nations, United Nations Youth Association Switzerland, United Nations Association (Switzerland), Swiss National Youth Council.

Geneva International Model United Nations (abbreviated GIMUN) is a non-governmental organization in Special Consultative Status with the Economic and Social Council of the United Nations since 2007. GIMUN is based in Geneva, Switzerland. It was created in 1999 by students of the Graduate Institute of International and Development Studies. Its aim is to promote the ideals and principles of the United Nations by giving students a chance to participate in educative events.

== Organizational Structure ==
=== Executive Board ===
The members of the Executive Board are responsible for organizing and financing all GIMUN events (including the Annual Conference) and representing GIMUN on numerous platforms. The Executive Board oversees the different departments of the association.

2026-2027 Executive Board Members
Name	Position
Amelie Vinall	President
Jonathan Gatti	Vice President
Sofia Perez Stpiczynska	Finance Director
Anna Hauswirth	Public Relations Director
Arya Cagin	Secretary General
Cayetano Ortín Alcaraz	Secretary General

=== Departments ===
Currently GIMUN has seven departments, each focusing on a specific area of the association’s operations:

- Public Relations: The Public Relations department, led by the Public Relations Director, is responsible for managing communications, media relations, and the public image of GIMUN.
- Finance: The Finance department, headed by the Finance Director, manages budgeting, financial planning, and oversees the allocation of funds for GIMUN activities.
- Events: The Events department is responsible for organizing and managing GIMUN events, including conferences and workshops.
- Human Resources: The Human Resources department manages recruitment, member relations, and supports the organizational structure by ensuring the smooth integration and communication between GIMUN members.
- Translation: The Translation Team ensures bilingualism within GIMUN by translating and proofreading important documents, such as emails, registration forms, and official communications.
- Delegation: The GIMUN Delegation provides students with opportunities to develop public speaking and debating skills through weekly meetings focused on international affairs and MUN preparation.

Each department consists of small teams, typically led by two department heads. The President and Vice-President oversee the department heads to ensure effective communication and the smooth functioning of the organisations.

=== Advisory Board ===
The Executive Board is supported by the Advisory Board, composed of former members of the Executive Board. They ensure a smooth transition between terms and help with long-term planning of the Association.

2026-2027 Advisory Board Members
Name	Position
Elina Lampi	President 2025-2026
Andrea Masciadri	Vice President 2025-2026
Stefaniya Shevtsova	Finance Director 2025-2026
Debora Mangone	PR Director 2026
Abril Ortega Andrade	Secretary General 2025-2026
Leen Alnajem	Secretary General 2025-2026
Shavonne McDonald	President 2024-2025
Lorenzo Tredici	Finance Director 2024-2025
Tomás Espinosa Roja	Secretary General 2024-2025
Yanna Spieser	PR Director 2024-2025, 2025-26

=== Past Executive Board Members ===
Executive Board Members
President	Vice President	Finance Director	Public Relations Director	Secretary Generals	Mandate
Yusra Suedi	Maeva Cherpillod	Aleksandar Stojanov	Fanny Rannaud	Alessia Anghileri, Fanny Charmey	2012-2013
Giulia Rigazio	Lena Becker	Charlotta Schuster	Mona-Lisa Kole	Aleksandar Stojanov, Quentin Nicaise	2013-2014
Simon Bianchi	Francesca Dal Poggetto	Esben Marcussen	Camille Fenter	Sandrine Chabbey, Jim Zouridis	2014-2015
Francesca Paschetta	Aida Fernández	Caroline Schmitt	Guillaume Zwygart	Antony Papadopoulos, Michaela Dorcikova	2015-2016
Flavio Baroffio	Iman Sarteur	Jesse Hanich	Cristina Valdés Argüelles	Emma Beelen, Pauline Legrand	2017-2018
Cristina Valdes	Irene Cibiriain	Florencia Lorca	Natalie Joray	Pauline Legrand, Alessandra Ciccolella	2018-2019
Bartosz Gdaniec	Cindy Bischofberger	Matthis Pasche	Ylljeta Lufaj	Natalie Joray, Mihail Mouhlov	2019-2020
Antoine Gouthuey	Joanna Ruan	Ethan Catanzariti	Elisaveta Wermelinger	Erin Hayes, Sarah-Luna Mongin	2020-2021
Emma Fischer	Chiara Müller	Hugo Fenoli-Rebellato	Besma Abdallah	Darius Harnisch, Nicolas Cavadini	2021-2022
Sophie Martin	Erin Hayes	Matteo Pal	Minwoo Ki / Johanna Tirinelli	Mathilda Pradal, Hibat-Allah Hably	2022-2023
Natacha Pambou	Maria-Teresa Failli	Mattia Morini	Petri S. Räisänen Castañeda	Matteo Dummar, Kara Djakou	2023-2024
Shavonne McDonald	Alyssa Hersheson	Lorenzo Tredici	Iren Neeranzona Khan / Yanna Spieser	Marlamaa Natsag, Tomás Espinosa Rojas	2024-2025
Elina Lampi	Andrea Masciadri	Stefaniya Shevtsova	Yanna Spieser / Debora Mangone	Abril Ortega Andrade, Leen Alnajem	2025-2026
Amelie Vinall	Jonathan Gatti	Sofia Perez Stpiczynska	Anna Hauswirth	Arya Cagin, Cayetano Ortín Alcaraz	2026-2027

== Activities ==
=== Annual Conference ===
Every year in February, GIMUN organizes its Annual Model United Nations conference. GIMUN is the only Model United Nations conference in the world to hold its entire conference within United Nations grounds, which is the European Headquarters of the United Nations and formerly the League of Nations.

The Annual Conference consists of around six committees with a about 30 participants per committee. It is a bilingual conference, held in both English and French with live interpretation. All outcome documents are also translated into English and French. It includes the roles of Bloc Representative, Ambassador, as well as a team of journalists.

History of Annual Conferences

Year	Dates	Secretaries-General	Theme	Committees
1999	Example	Nicolas Gérard, Jeremy Allouche, Jérôme Grimaud, Astrid Melchner	Example	Example
2001	13 – 16 March	Alessandra Roversi	Focus on African Issues	Example
2002	Example	Simon Blondin	Example	Example
2003	Example	Elodie Schindler	Example	Example
2004	Example	Idaho Menu	Example	SC, Conference on Disarmament, WTO, UNDP, UNHCR
2005	28 February - 4 March	David Lanz, Philipp Lustenberger	Rethinking Globalization	SC, Conference on Disarmament, UN Commission on Human Rights, ILO, UNHCR, WTO
2006	4–10 March	David Lanz, Philipp Lustenberger	One Step Ahead: modelling a reformed United Nations	Example
2007	3–9 March	Andreas Lehmann, Fabian Grass	One Step Ahead: modelling a reformed United Nations	Conference on Disarmament, ECOSOC, Human Rights Council, International Court of Justice, Peacebuilding Commission, Security Council (reformed, 24 members), UNHCR
2008	31 March - 4 April	Raphael Vogel, Caterina Luciani	Example	SC, HRC, ECOSOC, UNCTAD, UNFCCC, WHO
2009	14–20 March	Martin Staub, Faraz Merchant	Humanitarian Intervention and the Responsibility to Protect	SC, ECOSOC, HRC, GA6 (legal), Historic SC, UNEP
2010	13–19 March	Martin Staub, Faraz Merchant		
2011	12–18 March	Carla Niedek, Alexandre Steullet	Women and Development - Promoting a gender-balanced approach to development ethics	General Assembly Sixth Committee, UN Women, Security Council, Historic Security Council, Human Rights Council, ECOSOC
2012	17–23 March	Fanny Charmey, Alessia Anghileri	Example	Achieving Dialogue and Development through Cultural Diversity
2013	16–22 March	Fanny Charmey, Alessia Anghileri	Science for Peace and Development	
2014	22–28 March	Alexandre Stojanov, Quentin Nicaise	Access to Energy	
2015	21–27 March	Jim Zouridis, Sandrine Chabbey	Cross-border challenges and the new world architecture	Security Council, Human Rights Council, ECOSOC, International Organization for Migration, Sixth Committee (Legal), WHO
2021	04-7 March	Erin Hayes, Sarah-Luna Mongin	Priorities in the new age: reshaping the future	Security Council, Economic and Financial Committee, World Health Organization, United Nations International Children's Emergency Fund, United Nations Office for Outer Space Affairs, United Nations Framework Convention on Climate Change, Human Rights Council
2022	14–18 February	Darius Harnisch, Nicolas Cavadini	Restoring multilateralism in a fractured world: Questions that divide and matters that unite	Security Council, MUN Refugee Challenge, International Labour Organization, UN Human Rights Council, UNESCO, Historical Crisis Committee
2023	13–17 February	Hibat-Allah Hably, Mathilda Pradal	Addressing conflicts and crisis: the new perspectives of the regional and international institutions	International Labour Organization (Host), Security Council, MUN Refugee Challenge, African Union, Organization of American States, Association of Southeast Asian Nations, International Court of Justice
2024	12–16 February	Matteo Dummar, Kara Djakou	United in Diversity: Fostering Inclusion, Equity, and Cultural Understanding	International Labour Organization (Host), Security Council, High Commissioner for Refugees, Arab League, International Criminal Court, Human Rights Council, International Court of Justice, Bicameral Crisis
2025	10–14 February	Maralmaa Natsag, Tomás Espinosa Rojas	Navigating Global Conflicts: Fostering Peace Through Multilateral Cooperation	(Several Hosts): United Nations Offices Geneva, Graduate Institute, University of Geneva, World Intellectual Property Organization, World Trade Organisation, International Telecommunication Union. (Committees) United Nations Security Council, Historical International Telecommunication Union, International Court of Justice (in French), World Trade Committee, World Intellectual Property Organization, International Labour Organisation, United Nations Office For Disaster Risk Reduction, United Nations Human Rights Council, Bicameral Crisis

=== UN Day ===
To celebrate the anniversary of the entering into force of the United Nations Charter, GIMUN annually collaborates with the United Nations Office at Geneva to bring a conference entitled “UN Day”, organised on the 24 October. UN Day gives young people the opportunity to express their visions regarding a selected topic under an underarching theme, in one of various panels led by selected speakers who are specially invited for the occasion and specialised in the particular area of debate. In 2012, a special edition of UN Day was organised, in partnership with the Swiss National Youth Council SNYC, Youth Rep, and Junes, entitled "Decade". This was to commemorate the 10 year anniversary of Switzerland's adhesion to the United Nations.

=== Youth Perspectives ===
Youth Perspectives is a conference aimed at giving young adults the opportunity to exchange their points of view, negotiate contrasting perspectives, elaborate a common position and then develop a sustainable solution for various issues of contemporary international relations. By gathering young people with the purpose of sharing their ideas, the conference aims at reaching conclusions that reflect the position of youth on those matters. Due to GIMUN's Special Consultative Status, the outcomes of this conference have been submitted to the United Nations ECOSOC Ministerial Review.

=== Delegation Trip ===
Since 2009, GIMUN has organised educational trips, inviting students to visit a certain region of the world for a duration of between 1 and 2 weeks, to develop research on a particular theme of relevance to the United Nations mandate.

=== MUN Delegation ===
MUN Delegation was created in 2010 under the name of "MUN Society" - a weekly reunion of Geneva students who wished to learn about MUN Procedure and simulate committees for one academic semester. In 2012, MUN Society added an objective of sending its participants to a Model United Nations Conference in Europe. In October 2013 and 2014, certain MUN Society members attended Oxford University Model United Nations. As of September 2014, MUN Society became MUN Delegation: a small group of selected students engaging in brief training sessions in specific preparation for an MUN Conference. In October 2014, the students went to OXIMUN again, while in Spring 2015 they attended Moscow International Model United Nations, in Russia.

=== International Geneva ===
Since June 2014, GIMUN has organised a week-long itinerary to visit and discover the vast array of international organisations in Geneva.
