= Lady Laura =

Lady Laura may refer to:

- "Lady Laura", a song by Roberto Carlos
- Lady Laura Teresa Alma-Tadema (1852–1909), English painter
- Lady Laura Troubridge (1867–1946), British novelist

== See also ==
- Lady Lara, a 2015 yacht
- Laura (disambiguation)
