= Naseeb =

Naseeb, Nesib, Nasib, Nesip, or Nasip (Arabic: نصيب) is an Arabic term used in many languages that means "destiny" or "fate". The literal meaning in Arabic is "share", but it came to be understood as "one's share in life", and thus their destiny. It may refer to:

== Given name ==
=== Naseeb ===
- Naseeb Dawlatzai, Afghan cricketer
- Naseeb Saliba (1915–2008), Lebanese-American construction mogul
- Naseeb Shaheen (1931–2009), American biblical scholar
- Naseeb Singh (born 1967), Indian politician

=== Nasib ===
- Nasib Arida (1887–1946), Syrian poet and writer
- Nasib al-Bakri (1888–1966), Syrian politician
- Nasib al-Bitar (1890–1948), Palestinian jurist
- Nasib Farah (born 1981), Danish-Somali filmmaker
- Nasib Al Matni (1910–1958), Lebanese journalist
- Nasib Piriyev (born 1981), Azerbaijani entrepreneur and philanthropist
- Nasib bey Yusifbeyli (1881–1920), Azerbaijani publicist and statesman

=== Nasip ===
- Nasip Naço (born 1961), Albanian politician

=== Nesib ===
- Nesib Malkić (1961–1993), Bosnian military commander

=== Nesip ===
- Nesip Ibrahimi, Albanian politician

== Surname ==
- Lotfi Nasib (1926–2011), Finnish ice hockey player

== Film ==
- Nasib (1945 film), a Bollywood film of 1945
- Naseeb (1981 film), a Hindi film
- Naseeb (1994 film), see Shaan Shahid filmography
- Naseeb (1997 film), a Hindi film
- Naseeb Apna Apna (disambiguation), various films

== Literature ==
- Nasīb (poetry), a literary form usually constituting an amatory prelude to a qaṣīdah

== Places ==
- Nasib, Syria, a town in the Daraa Governorate of Syria
- Nasib Border Crossing, a border crossing between Syria and Jordan

== See also ==
- Nassib, given name and surname
