= Nassib =

Nassib is a masculine given name and surname of Arabic origin. Notable people with the name include:

== Given name ==
- Nassib Lahoud (1944–2012), Lebanese politician
- Nassib Nassar, American computer scientist and classical pianist

== Surname ==
- Carl Nassib (born 1993), American football player
- Ryan Nassib (born 1990), American football player

== See also ==
- Naseeb (disambiguation), includes people with similar given name and surname
