= Association des professionnels navigants de l'aviation =

== APNA presentation ==
Association des professionnels navigants de l'aviation
- Founded: 1927
- Founder: Joseph Sadi-Lecointe
- Type: voluntary association
- Purpose: Group professional aircrew serving or retired civil aviation, regardless of their category: airline, test flight, general aviation and whatever their specialty, regardless of political affiliation or association.
- Location: Charles-de-Gaulle Airport, France
- Region served: France
- Leader: Geoffroy Bouvet
- Key people: Jean Mermoz, Joseph Sadi Lecointe
- Website: https://www.apna-asso.com

The Association des professionnels navigants de l'aviation (APNA) (in English French association of professional aviation aircrew) is a French aeronautical non-profit organization created in 1927 to "group, in a close community all those who belong, by their profession, to the civil aviation, and participate in the development of the national aeronautics, in conjunction with the public authorities, the manufacturers, the airlines and the professionals unions"

== History ==
APNA has been created in 1927 by Joseph Sadi-Lecointe. During many years, it was the only non-profit organization to represent the aircrew to authorities and airlines. Today, APNA helps of the aeronautical development in Europe in relationship with authorities, administrations and airlines

In 1926, finding that it became necessary to seek a legal structure for these new professions of pilot, mechanics and all aircrew. A few met periodically to discuss it. The idea of creating an association to defend the profession spread quickly and at the end of a meeting held on 11 December 1926, this group of pilots had published a circular intended for aircrew professionals known at the time.

The first general assembly was held on 9 February 1927. It elected the officers:

President: Faillant Henry

Vice-chair: Coupet Lucien

Vice-chair: Sadi Lecointe

Treasurer: Charpentier René

Assistant treasurer: Bossoutrot Lucien

Secretary: Val Serge

Assistant secretary: Douchy René

Bajac Robert, Bellonte Maurice, Chailloux Antoine, Chicoineau Paul, Constume Marcel, Denneulin Jean, Denis Jean, Héricher Henry, Guidon Louis, Laulhé Jean, Morel Auguste, Perignon (De) Henry, Salmon André, Sprimont Jean.

All of them are professional aviators except the President who is industrial.

During this assembly, the acronym APNA is maintained, the statutes are adopted and the goals of the association are defined as follows:

"The association aims to group together pilots, navigators, mechanics, radiotelegraphers, Photographers, in close solidarity, who devote their daily professional activity to aviation, and to enable them to participate in the development of national aviation in close liaison with public authorities, manufacturers and companies. She wants to help accident pilots, their widows and children."

A supplement to the statutes will be introduced on:

"Insurance. Pensions. Retirement homes. Professional status. Contracts of commitments. Committee of studies and investigations. Arbitration. Responsibility of the aviator, his Prerogatives, his duties. Distribution of salaries and allowances. Refresher courses. The airman and the tax."

The association thus declared in accordance with the Law of 1 July 1901 appears in the Official Journal of 22 May 1927.

The efforts made by the A.P.N.A. and the various ministerial departments with regard to the insurance of the aircrew will materialize in the law of 30 March 1928.

In this Act there is first a definition of aircrew:

"The personnel of the military, maritime and technical aeronautics corps who normally and effectively practice air navigation constitute the aircrew of the aeronautics."

President Henry Faillant proposes to organize an International Congress of Professional Aviation.

It took place on 16, 17 and 18 June 1928. It is organized in Reims by the A.P.N.A. in collaboration with the Ligue Internationale des Aviateurs and the Aéro Club de France.

In December 1928, the FNA (Fédération Nationale des Aviateurs) was created within which the APNA, Les Ailes Brisées and the Union des Pilotes Civils de France joined forces to help the victims who will not be supported by the insurance. An emergency fund will be created.

In the years that followed, the APNA and the government worked together to improve flight safety and to formalize the status of pilots.

Two members of the APNA acquired universal fame during 1930; Dieudoné Costes and Maurice Bellonte.

In 1935, the Minister of Air asked the President of APNA to organize the «Civil Aviation» part of the air festival to be held on 1 and 2 June in Villacoublay.

The President of APNA is also a member of the Air Navigation Safety Committee, established by the Ministry, of which Dieudonné Costes is the President.

The law of 25 March 1936 finally establishes the legal status of Civil Aviation Aircrew. Following this, the legislation made the trade union form mandatory for the representation of employees, and the discussion of Collective Contracts. The APNA therefore created within it the first union of Aircrew Professionals which consisted of three branches (Tests, Line and Aerial Work), which functioned until the war, with the same men and the same means, mainly discussing Collective Contracts and Patents and Public Aviation. But she retained her own personality as a Friendly Association, a decision which proved wise.

In 1936, the floatplane La Croix du Sud disappears off Dakar. Jean Mermoz and 3 members of his crew are part of the APNA.

Every year a commemoration is celebrated in the square of the town hall of Neuilly where is erected the statue of Jean Mermoz.

The General Assembly of 24 February 1939 marked a new turning point in the evolution of APNA, a direct consequence of the cooperation between the Federation of Aircrew Unions and this one.

APNA must be able to create a School of Preparation for Line, Testing, and Aerial Work. The Ministry has indeed provided a sum of two and a half million for the creation of an Official School of Air Navigation. The foundations laid include:

– A very strict medical examination;

– The training and presentation of candidates for elementary and higher Air Navigation certificates;

– P.S.V. (English piloting without visibility)

– Courses, using the Link-Trainer offered by Curtiss House at APNA.

The declaration of war of 3 September obviously led to disturbances in the administrative organization of the association.

On 27 November Henry Guillaumet’s plane was shot down. Four crew members were members of the APNA.

Activity will be reduced during the war. Limited to moral and financial support.

The first two female pilots admitted to the APNA were Maryse Bastié and Maryse Hilsz in 1944.

After the war, new needs stemming mainly from the spectacular development of Air Transport, led to the creation of one, then several independent unions, while APNA was dormant.

In 1952, APNA created the National Union of Airline Pilots (SNPL in French) dedicated specifically to the defense of Airline Pilots.

"The various actions undertaken, and the benefits obtained by the association, the main ones of which are:

– Law of 30 March 1928 for the establishment of the Civil Aviation Provident Fund.

– Prior to the establishment of trade unions, advocacy with the Department.

– 45% tax relief for business expenses.

– Creation of trade unions, establishment of collective wage contracts.

– The Status of Aircrew Professionals (Law of 25 March 1936), written only on documents submitted by the APNA.

– Re-establishment of the Wartime Civilian Contingency Fund.

– Supporting the widows and children of our fallen comrades.

– Requests for Awards and Decorations

– Relief Fund for the Unemployed, Mutual Aid Fund for Those Mobilized in Time of War."

== Administration ==
=== Presidents ===
1927 – 1930 : Henry Faillant

1930 – 1939 : Joseph Sadi Lecointe

1939 – 1944 : Michel Detroyat

1944 – 1946 : Lucien Coupet

1946– 1952 : René Le Bail

1952 – 1962 : Jean Dabry

1962 – 1967 : A. Goepfert

1967 – 1985 :

1985 – 1994 : Claude Bechet

1994 – 2005 : Xavier Barral

2005 – 2011 : Claude Guilbert

2011 – 2021 : Geoffroy Bouvet
