= United Nations Youth Association Switzerland =

The United Nations Youth Association Switzerland (UNYA Switzerland; German: Jugend-UNO Netzwerk Schweiz; French: Réseau Suisse Jeunesse-ONU; Italian: Network Svizzero gioventù-ONU) is the national network for Model United Nations teams and UN-related youth associations in Switzerland.

== General ==
UNYA Switzerland is the umbrella organization for Swiss student and youth associations related to the United Nations. Founded in 2007 by former Federal Councillor Micheline Calmy-Rey, the network gathers twelve associations from three linguistic regions in Switzerland. The majority are Model United Nations (MUN) teams that run simulations of UN conferences and organize various activities such as panel discussions or workshops about UN related issues.

== Goals ==
The main goals of UNYA Switzerland are:

1. To promote the aims and objectives of the United Nations;
2. To coordinate the work of local UN youth organizations, as well as Model United Nations societies within Switzerland, and maintain regular knowledge transfer between them;
3. To support the organization of high-level academic simulations of UN conferences, organs, agencies and any other multilateral negotiation forum for students at university level or equivalent, as well as high school level or equivalent;
4. To promote, alongside the objectives and aims of the UN, those of Switzerland as a place of peace and multilateral democracy, as well as cultural exchange;
5. To supplement the formation of its participating individuals by bringing a practical dimension to their theoretical knowledge.

== Projects ==
At the national level, UNYA Switzerland coordinates the activities of its member associations and realizes a variety of different projects. There are several projects that take place annually. JUNESMUN is a national Model United Nations conference that covers topics that are currently discussed in the UN. ISYFUN, the intra-Swiss Forum on the United Nations, is another major event that include a visit to the UN headquarters in Geneva. In addition, a workshop on a UN related topic, a MUN Workshop (e.g. a training on rhetoric, Rules of Procedures), a panel discussion and MiniMUN (Model United Nations conferences at high schools) are organized each year.

Besides that, UNYA Switzerland conducts various nonrecurring events. In 2011, a large youth UN General Assembly was held in the House of Parliament in Bern. This event took place in connection with the election of Joseph Deiss as the president of the UN General Assembly. The same year, a media workshop was conducted for MUN teams from across Europe. This workshop aimed to strengthen the communication skills of youth associations in order to raise awareness of UN issues more effectively. In 2013, an intercultural study project is being organized that focuses on the issue of corporate social responsibility. Several events are held in Switzerland and a study trip to Ghana in cooperation with UNYA Ghana takes places.

== Collaboration ==
UNYA Switzerland is a member of the SNYC (Swiss Federation of Youth Associations) and UNYANET (United Nations Associations Network), a European network of UNYAs. Furthermore, UNYA Switzerland collaborates with the Federal Department of Foreign Affairs in Switzerland, with the association UN-Switzerland (GSUN), JUNON, the Swiss association for foreign affairs (SGA) und the UNO Academia.

== Funding ==
UNYA Switzerland is partially funded by the Federal Department of Foreign Affairs (FDFA). Following projects are stipulated by contract and financed by the Federal Department of Foreign Affairs: JUNESMUN, ISYFUN, a MUN workshop, a UN workshop and a panel discussion. To realize additional projects, UNYA Switzerland depends on finding sponsors.

== Member associations ==
- ETH MUN (ETH Zürich)
- MUN Berne (University of Berne)
- MUN Ticino
- GIMUN (University of Geneva)
- MUNiLU (University of Luzern)
- MUN Team UZH (University of Zürich)
- Mosaïque UNIL (University of Lausanne)
- MUN Basel (University of Basel)
- FriMUN Team (University of Fribourg)
- St. Gallen MUN (University of St. Gallen)
- MUN EPFL (EPFL)

== Presidents ==
- Natalie Joray (2020-2023)
- Amin Tlili (2023-Today)
