= Apna =

Apna or APNA can mean:

- Apna, Armenia village in Aragatsotn Province of Armenia
- APNA, Atkins Park Neighborhood Association
- Apna (New Zealand), a New Zealand television channel and radio station
- Apna Dal (Kamerawadi), a political party in India
- Apna Dal (Soneylal), a breakaway faction of the above
- Association des professionnels navigants de l'aviation, French association of professional aviation aircrew
- APNA, American Psychiatric Nurses Association
