= Felix Vulis =

Russian businessperson

- Born: Felix Jeff Vulis; 11 October 1955 (age 70); USSR
- Education: Moscow State Institute of International Relations
- Occupation: Businessman
- Years active: 1976–present
- Title: Chief Executive of Eurasian Natural Resources Corporation plc (ENRC)
- Term: 2009–present
- Successor: Incumbent

Felix Jeff Vulis (born 11 October 1955) is a Russian businessman. He is the chief executive of Eurasian Natural Resources Corporation plc (ENRC), a British multinational natural resources company.

== Early life ==
Vulis graduated with an MSc degree in electrical engineering from the Novocherkassk Technical Institute and has an MBA from the Moscow State Institute of International Relations.

== Career ==
He has been chief executive of ENRC since 20 August 2009, having joined the company in 2001. He resigned in February 2011, citing family commitments, but was reappointed in September 2011.
