= Nasib Piriyev =

Azerbaijani entrepreneur and philanthropist

- Born: Nasib Nizami Oglu Piriyev; 2 June 1981 (age 45); Baku, Azerbaijan.
- Education: AIU University in London; Moscow State Institute of International Relations; Higher School of Economics
- Occupation: Business executive
- Known for: Investments; Arts; Charity
- Title: Co-founder at PNN Group
- Spouse: Olena Piriyev
- Children: 3

Nasib Piriyev (born 2 June 1981) is an Azerbaijani entrepreneur and philanthropist.

Piriyev is the CEO of PNN Group, an international holding company he founded with his father, Nizami Piriyev, in 1994. Through PNN, he holds ownership stakes in various international companies, including AzMeCo and Buta Kitchen. Since May 2022, Piriyev has also served as the managing partner at Woodford Finance, a London-based financing firm.

He is the founder of Buta Arts Centre, a non-profit organization dedicated to the development of Azerbaijani arts and culture. Piriyev has been involved in organizing cultural events, including the Buta Festivals held in London during 2009–2010 and 2014–2015.

Piriyev's career has been subject to scrutiny, including reported legal disputes and an Interpol red notice in 2015.

== Biography ==
Nasib Piriyev was born on 2 June 1981 and grew up in Baku, Azerbaijan. In 1992, his family moved to Moscow, Russia. In 1998, he began his undergraduate studies at the American International University in London, England, where he earned a Bachelor of Business Administration in 2001.

In 2006, Piriyev enrolled at the Moscow State Institute for International Relations in Russia to pursue a postgraduate degree, graduating in 2008 with a Master of Economics in Oil and Gas Industry and Energy Security. Since 2011, he has held a Candidate of Sciences in Economics from the Higher School of Economics in Russia.

== Business career ==
=== PNN Energy ===
In 2001, Nasib Piriyev joined his family's business, which specialized in manufacturing parts for crude oil refineries and gas condensate processing units. As head of business development, he oversaw several key projects across Central Asia during a period of significant growth. Among his early achievements was the construction and commissioning of a 500-ton-per-day gas condensate processing unit in Kungrad, Uzbekistan, in 2003. In 2005, the company completed a 1,000-ton-per-day oil refinery in Hairatan, Afghanistan, followed by a 500-ton-per-day oil refinery unit in Jalal-Abad, Kyrgyzstan, in 2006.

=== AzMeCo ===
In 2007, the Piriyev family initiated the development of a methanol-based petrochemical complex in Garadag, Azerbaijan. Azerbaijan Methanol Company (AzMeCo) was established under the leadership of Nizami Piriyev, with Nasib Piriyev appointed as CEO. As CEO, he was involved in structuring the company and implementing corporate governance, collaborating closely with the International Finance Corporation (IFC).

Under his leadership, AzMeCo incorporated green technologies, including a CO₂ capture unit, enhancing production efficiency while reducing emissions. Piriyev also oversaw the company's financing, securing a $120 million non-recourse loan from the European Bank for Reconstruction and Development (EBRD), with the signing ceremony attended by former British Prime Minister Tony Blair. He negotiated additional financing with major European banks and Russian banks, including VTB and Sberbank. In 2012, AzMeCo secured a take-or-pay methanol off-take contract with BP, and the plant was completed in 2014, exporting its first product internationally.

=== PNN Lifestyle ===
In 2010, Piriyev diversified the family business into the food, consumer, and lifestyle sectors, acquiring franchise and distribution rights for international brands. He founded AFK Ltd, which launched KFC in Azerbaijan in 2011, later selling the company and establishing UFC Ltd, introducing KFC restaurants in Kyiv, Ukraine, in 2012.

In 2013, PNN Group obtained the rights to operate WH Smith bookstores in Baku and expanded the brand in the region. The same year, Piriyev opened a De Beers Jewelry boutique in Baku, beginning the expansion of his fashion group, which later acquired luxury stores on Baku's Neftchilyar Avenue, including Alfred Dunhill, Brunello Cucinelli, Santoni, Nina Ricci, and Sergio Rossi.

Following UNESCO's recognition of chovgan as part of Azerbaijan's Intangible Cultural Heritage, Piriyev founded the Baku Guardians, Azerbaijan's first professional polo club in London. In May 2014, he organized an exhibition match and charity event with Prince William captaining the team. In September 2014, he organized the Chovgan Twilight Polo event in Richmond, Surrey, featuring a match with the Baku Guardians and a gala night with a charity auction benefiting War Child and the Naked Heart Foundation.

In 2015, Piriyev, his wife Olena, and perfumer Maria Candida Gentile launched Lankaran Forest, a perfume inspired by Azerbaijan's Lankaran forest. The fragrance, presented in a Lalique crystal flacon, debuted at an after-party for the 2nd Buta Festival at the Royal Academy of Arts in London.

== Investments ==
=== PNN Capital ===
After relocating to London in 2015, Nasib Piriyev focused on restructuring PNN Group and began investing in publicly traded companies, including on the Shenzhen Stock Exchange in China since 2019.

In 2020, he joined a consortium that submitted a £400 million bid to acquire a controlling stake in West Ham United F.C. and redevelop the Queen Elizabeth Olympic Park. The bid required owner David Sullivan to relinquish control but was rejected, as Sullivan opted to sell a 27% stake to Czech billionaire Daniel Kretinsky for £200 million while retaining control of the club.

=== Woodford Finance ===
In 2023, Piriyev's PNN Capital Ltd. established Woodford Finance in partnership with Lord Woolley, Baron of Woodford. The firm's projects include investments in Lottery.com (NASDAQ: LYTRY) and its subsidiary Sports.com.

In 2024, Woodford Finance launched 360Sports, a sports and entertainment venture that sponsors the 2024–25 Maltese Premier League and is developing a mobile fan engagement platform. The company also opened a hospitality arm, Buta Kitchen, in the United Kingdom.

== Disputes ==
In 2015, following the commissioning of AzMeCo, PNN Group and the Piriyev family were subject to allegations of state expropriation of their assets. Azerbaijani authorities arrested Nizami Piriyev, Nasib's father, in May 2015 and issued an Interpol notice for Nasib Piriyev later that year. The Azerbaijani government stated that PNN Group had not repaid a loan obtained from the state-owned Azerbaijan International Bank. The Piriyev family denied any wrongdoing, asserting that the actions were politically motivated.

In a 2024 interview, Piriyev stated that after he filed a formal complaint, Interpol reviewed the 2015 Red Notice and that the General Assembly revoked the warrant in full, ruling it invalid and lacking any legal substance. He said this amounted to a clear and public exoneration and alleged that Azerbaijani media outlets did not report the decision.

== Culture and philanthropy ==
=== Buta Arts Centre ===
Nasib Piriyev is the founder of Buta Arts Centre, a non-profit organization established in 2004 to promote Azerbaijani arts and culture. The organization later expanded to include several branches, including Buta Creative Lab (design and artwork), Buta Films (film and media production), and the Buta Festival of Arts in London. Buta Arts Centre has organized over 120 cultural events in Baku, Moscow, and London, and has produced numerous books, CDs, documentary films, and articles on Azerbaijani history, art, and culture.

From 2004 to 2016, the centre supported the musical career of Shahin Novrasli, producing several albums, including Live in Moscow (2005) and Eternal Way (2006). Novrasli became a prominent figure in Azerbaijani jazz and earned praise from Ahmad Jamal, who produced two of his albums. In 2020, Piriyev and Novrasli collaborated on a lockdown-inspired animated short film single, Quarantine, written and produced by Piriyev and animated by Slovenian artist Tomi VGN.

Buta Arts Centre's projects have included organizing concerts by Andrea Bocelli in Baku (2009) and Plácido Domingo (2010), as well as producing Ennio Morricone's concert with the Azerbaijan State Symphony Orchestra and Choir. Other projects have featured Nino Katamadze at the Green Theatre, Andron Konchalovsky at the Mugham Centre, and Keiko Matsui at the Heydar Aliyev Palace.

In 2012, Piriyev founded Buta Films, a film and television content company focused on producing documentaries highlighting Azerbaijan history and culture. In 2014, he co-produced Sonuncu (The Last One), which was selected for the Cannes Film Festival and received several awards, including the Audience Prize at the London City Film Festival and Best Film at the Izmir International Film Festival.

=== 1st Buta Festival in London (2009–2010) ===
In 2009, Piriyev launched the Buta Festival of Azerbaijani Art, a 100-day celebration in London a 100-day celebration in London marking the fifth anniversary of Buta Arts Centre. Running from 25 November 2009 to 7 March 2010, the festival featured 24 projects across visual arts, photography, jazz, ethnic and symphonic music, dance, decorative arts, literature, and film, hosted at multiple venues throughout the city.

=== 2nd Buta Festival in London (2014–2015) ===
The second edition of the festival took place five years later. Piriyev explained that the five-year interval allowed sufficient time to prepare new programs, collaborate with artists and musicians, and reflect changes in contemporary Azerbaijani culture. Running from 7 November 2014 to 21 March 2015, the 2nd Buta Festival was hosted at venues including the Barbican Centre, Royal Albert Hall, Sotheby's, Saatchi Gallery, Southwark Cathedral, Westminster Hall, Guildhall, Cadogan Hall, Asia House, Mosaic Rooms, Ronny Scott's, and the Royal Academy of Arts.
