= Shevchenko mine =

Nickel mine in Kazakhstan

- Location: Kazakhstan
- Products: Nickel

The Shevchenko mine is a large mine in the north-west of Kazakhstan. Shevchenko represents one of the largest nickel reserves in Kazakhstan having estimated reserves of 104.4 million tonnes of ore grading 0.75% nickel. The 104.4 million tonnes of ore contains 0.78 million tonnes of nickel metal.

== See also ==
- Mineral industry of Kazakhstan
