= Voskhod mine =

Chromium mine in Kazakhstan

- Location: Kazakhstan
- Products: Chromium

The Voskhod mine is a large mine in the north-west of Kazakhstan. Voskhod represents one of the largest chromium reserve in Kazakhstan having estimated reserves of 27.1 million tonnes of ore grading 48.5% chromium. The 27.1 million tonnes of ore contains 13.1 million tonnes of chromium metal.

== See also ==
- Mineral industry of Kazakhstan
