= AzMeCo =

Methanol production company in Azerbaijan

- Company type: Manufacturing
- Industry: Energy
- Headquarters: Azerbaijan
- Key people: Chairman: Nizami Piriyev. Hidayat Sultanov, Director General
- Website: www.azmeco.com

AzMeCo (formally known as the Azerbaijan Methanol Company) is a methanol production company located in Azerbaijan. The company is primarily focused on petrochemical projects, specifically the construction and operation of gas and methanol factories. AzMeCo also works on hydrocarbon projects in the Caspian Sea.

== History ==
=== 2007 ===
AzMeCo company was founded in 2007.

=== 2012 ===
In November 2012, the International Bank of Azerbaijan, Asia House, and TheCityUK organized a conference known as the Caspian Corridor Conference. The IBA, Asia House, and TheCityUK created a business framework at the conference upon which the future sale and marketing of AzMeCo's methanol was based.

Additionally, in 2012 BP agreed to buy methanol from AzMeCo. According to petrochemical industry research service Petrochemicals ResearchViews and Azerbaijani newspaper Today.Az, AzMeCo agreed to sell its entire methanol production exclusively to BP.

=== 2013 ===
AzMeCo built the first methanol plant in the South Caucasus region and Central Asia, according to Azer News. AzMeCo estimates that the plant will produce 560,000 tonnes of methanol per year. The International Bank of Azerbaijan and European Bank for Reconstruction and Development (EBRD) financed the construction of the plant.

=== 2015 ===
AzMeCo declared it would align with Sovereign Wealth Fund conglomerates to invest with low risk in productive overseas projects.

== Future ==
In 2013, the Chairman of AzMeCo told reporters that the company would invest in petrochemical and oil refinery plants in Libya.
