= Moscow International Model United Nations =

United Nations competition held in Moscow, Russia

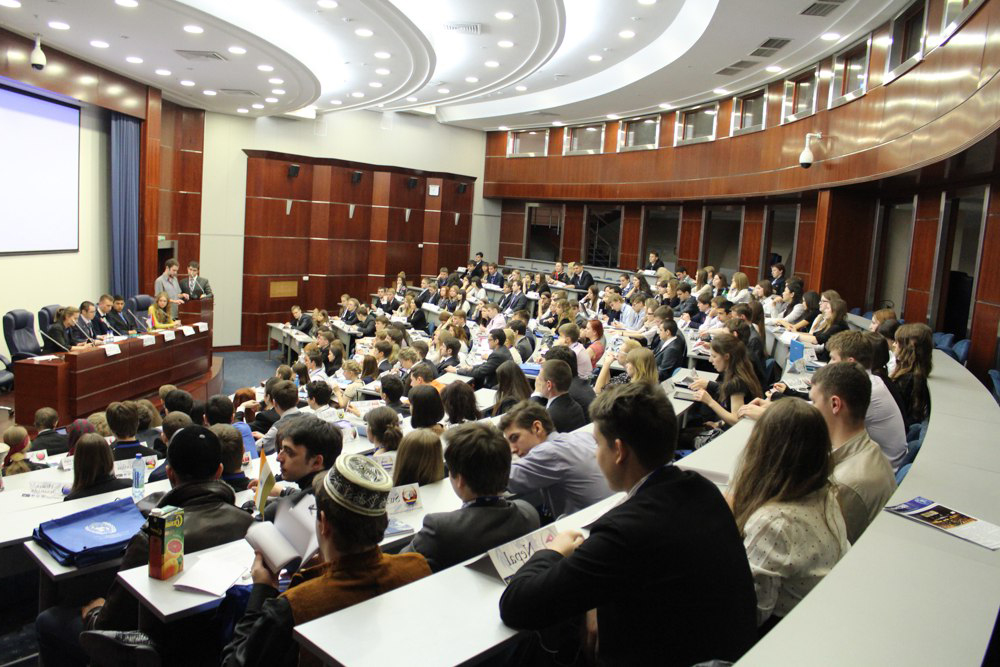
General Assembly, MIMUN 2013

Moscow International Model United Nations (MIMUN) is a Model UN in Russia, conducted annually in Moscow State Institute of International Relations (MGIMO – University). It is a combination of a scientific conference and a role play, where university and high school students simulate the work of different UN bodies in several United Nations official languages.

== Organizers ==
Moscow International Model UN is one of the programs of UN Association-Russia and is held in cooperation with MGIMO-University under the aegis of the World Federation of United Nations Associations.

== History ==
The first Model UN in MGIMO was held in 1999. In 2000 the conference obtained international status and since then Moscow International Model UN has been held regularly.

== Structure ==
During the Moscow International Model UN university and high school students simulate the work of the UN organs. Traditionally General Assembly, Security Council, Economic and Social Council (ECOSOC) and International Court of Justice rank among them. Also, main General Assembly Committees, some ECOSOC functional commissions, Human Rights Council are usually simulated.

== Secretariat ==
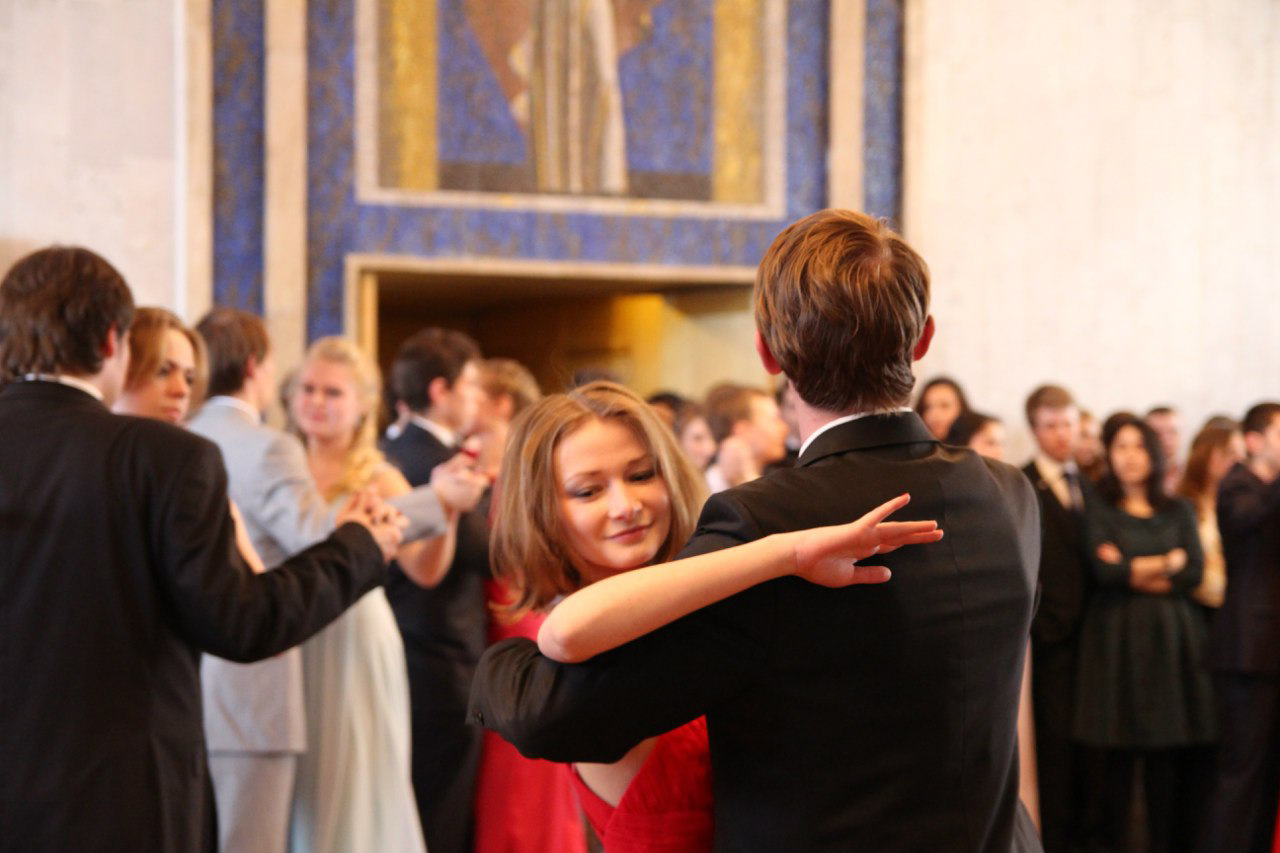
MIMUN Ball 2014

Secretariat of moscow International Model UN works throughout the year. It deals with questions concerning the organization process of Model. Secretariat issues an official printed newspaper of Moscow International Model UN - "Vestnik".

== MIMUN 2015 ==
MIMUN 2015 was held from April 19 to April 24, 2015. The conference hosted committees in all the 6 languages: for the first time Spanish, Arabic and Chinese were included.

Body	Agenda	Language	Members
General Assembly	UN reform: measures and proposals	Russian	193
Security Council	Comprehensive review of the whole question of peacekeeping operations in all their aspects	English	15
Economic and Social Council (ECOSOC)	International Migration	English	54
International Court of Justice (ICJ)	Obligations concerning Negotiations relating to Cessation of the Nuclear Arms Race and to Nuclear Disarmament (Marshall Islands v. United Kingdom)	English	15
Human Rights Council	1. The promotion and protection of human rights in the context of peaceful protests 2. The promotion and protection of human rights and fundamental freedoms while countering terrorism	Russian	47
GA First Committee (DISEC)	The nuclear programme of DPRK as a threat to international peace and security	Chinese	50
GA Third Committee (Social, Humanitarian & Cultural)	The safety of journalists and the issue of impunity	Spanish	50
GA Sixth Committee (LEGAL)	The right of people to self-determination	French	50
Commission on Narcotic Drugs	International cooperation against the world drug problem	Russian	53
UNESCO Executive Board	United Nations Literacy Decade: Education for All	English	58
ILO Governing Body	Global Employment Crisis	English	56
League of Arab States	The Islamic State: the international terrorism threat	Arabic	22
