= Alexander Mashkevitch =

Kyrgyz-Israeli businessman and investor (1954–2025)

Alexander Mashkevich
- אלכסנדר משקביץ
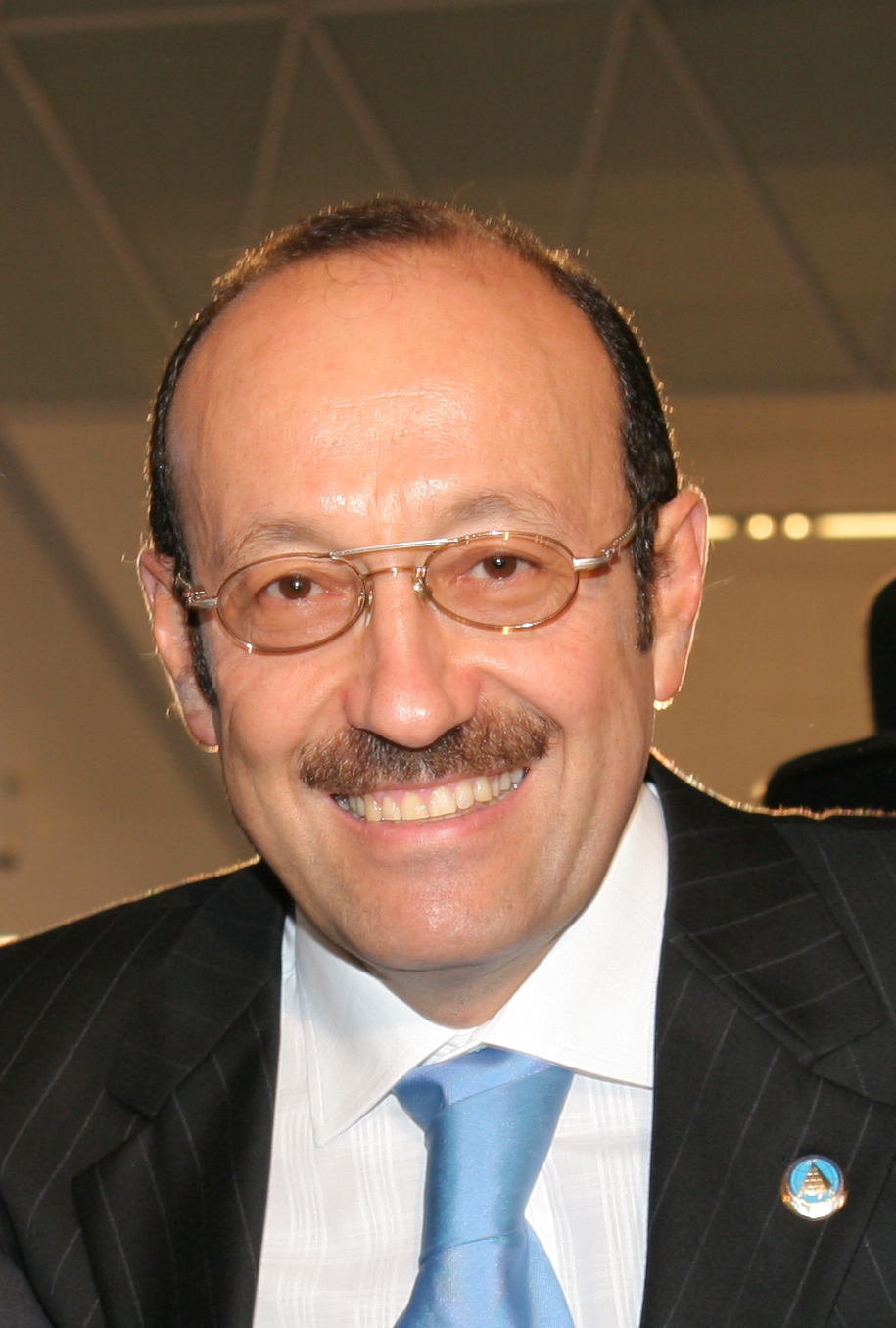
- Mashkevich in 2008
- Born: 23 February 1954; Frunze, Kyrgyz SSR, Soviet Union
- Died: 22 March 2025 (aged 71)
- Occupation: Major shareholder in Eurasian Natural Resources Corporation

Alexander Antonovich Mashkevich (Hebrew: אלכסנדר משקביץ; also transliterated Alexandr Mashkevic; Russian: Александр Антонович Машкевич; 23 February 1954 – 22 March 2025) was an Israeli-Kazakh businessman and investor who had major holdings and close political relationships in Kazakhstan. He held both Kazakh and Israeli citizenship.

Mashkevitch enriched himself in the aftermath of the collapse of the Soviet Union, as he, Patokh Chodiev, and Alijan Ibragimov obtained mineral and gas operations after those operations were privatized in Kazakhstan. They founded the company Eurasian Natural Resources Corporation.

== Background ==
Mashkevich was born in Frunze, Kyrgyz SSR, Soviet Union, on 23 February 1954. His father, Anton, a doctor born in Lithuania, and his mother, Rakhel Yoffe, a lawyer born in Vitebsk, in northern Belarus, were evacuated to Kyrgyzstan in 1941. His family background was Lithuanian Jewish. He was a graduate of Kyrgyz State University, where he studied philology. Mashkevich began his professional life as an academic but became a businessman during the Soviet era of perestroika.

Mashkevich served as president of the Euro-Asian Jewish Congress (EAJC) until 2011. The EAJC is one of the five regional branches of the World Jewish Congress (WJC). He was also the founding patron of the Alliance of Rabbis in Islamic States. He was also a major donor to the Israel lobby group European Friends of Israel.

In 2002, in apparent consultation with Israeli Defense Minister Binyamin Ben-Eliezer, Mashkevich asked Kazakhstan's President Nursultan Nazarbayev — a personal friend — to intervene with Iranian authorities to release Israeli soldiers captured by Hezbollah.

== Career ==
Mashkevich, Patokh Chodiev, and Alijan Ibragimov formed "the Trio", a group of Kazakh businessmen who became billionaires. The Trio gained control of the recently privatized chromium, alumina, and gas operations in Kazakhstan, which were among the largest in the world.

Mashkevich was a major shareholder in the Eurasian National Resources Corporation (ENRC), now one of the world's leading natural resources groups. ENRC, based in London, operates a number of metals assets in Kazakhstan and Africa, having acquired numerous mining operations in Eastern Europe and Africa. In 2009, ENRC generated a $1.464 billion profit on sales of $3.8 billion. ENRC was floated on the London Stock Exchange in December 2007, with a market capitalisation on admission of approximately £6.8 billion. In 2013, ENRC was privatized to form the Eurasian Resources Group.

Mashkevich was one of the owners of London-based Alferon Management, which acquired mining operations in Zambia, the Democratic Republic of Congo, Indonesia, Kosovo, Russia, and other countries.

In 2019, he was on the Forbes list of billionaires, with a worth of $2.4 billion.

On 6 April 2011, Mashkevitch announced his intention to found a Jewish version of Al-Jazeera.

== Personal life and death ==
Alexander Mashkevich was married and had two children. He was the owner of the luxury yacht Lady Lara.

Mashkevitch died on 22 March 2025, at the age of 71.
