= Jean Dabry =

French aviator

Jean Dabry (8 December 1901, Avignon – 5 July 1990, Montmorency) was a French aviator of the Aéropostale, then an airline pilot for Air France. He is buried in the Montmorency cemetery.

== Biography ==
Dabry gained his first officer-rank when he joined the Aéropostale in 1928 as navigator. Two years later on 12 April 1930 with Jean Mermoz as pilot and Léopold Gimié as radio-operator they made a closed circuit length record by floatplane. The aircraft, a Latécoère 28 fitted with a 600 hp Hispano-Suiza engine flew 4 345 km for 30h25.

On 12 and 13 May 1930 the same crew performed the first crossing of the South Atlantic Ocean with the floatplane Laté 28 "Compte de la Vault" fitted with an Hispano-Suiza engine (600 hp). They flew between Saint Louis, Sénégal to Natal (Brazil). They delivered 130 kg of mail during this 3200 km journey. During the flight two records would be established namely, distance in a straight line for a seaplane and mail delivery time as they flew for 20 hours and 15 minutes.

He became a captain at Air France in 1936. During his career he made more than 540 crossings of the North Atlantic Ocean. He became one of the executive directors of the company. He had logged 16,000 hours of flight time when he left Air France in 1957.

== Publications ==
- French book : Amicale des pionniers des lignes aériennes Latécoère-aéropostale, L'Aéropostale : l'histoire, les hommes : à Toulouse, terre d'envol, Castres, J. Gasc, 1983 (rédigé par Jean Dabry et Gaston Vedel)

== Awards ==
- Commandeur de la Légion d'Honneur
- Grand-croix de l'ordre national du Mérite
- Médaille de l'Aéronautique

== See also ==
- Aéropostale (aviation)

== Bibliography ==
- Marcel Catillon, Mémorial aéronautique : qui était qui, Paris, Nouvelles Editions latines, coll. « Mémorial de l'aéronautique » (no 2), 1997 (ISBN 978-2-723-32053-5), p. 57
