= Lady Lara =

Yacht

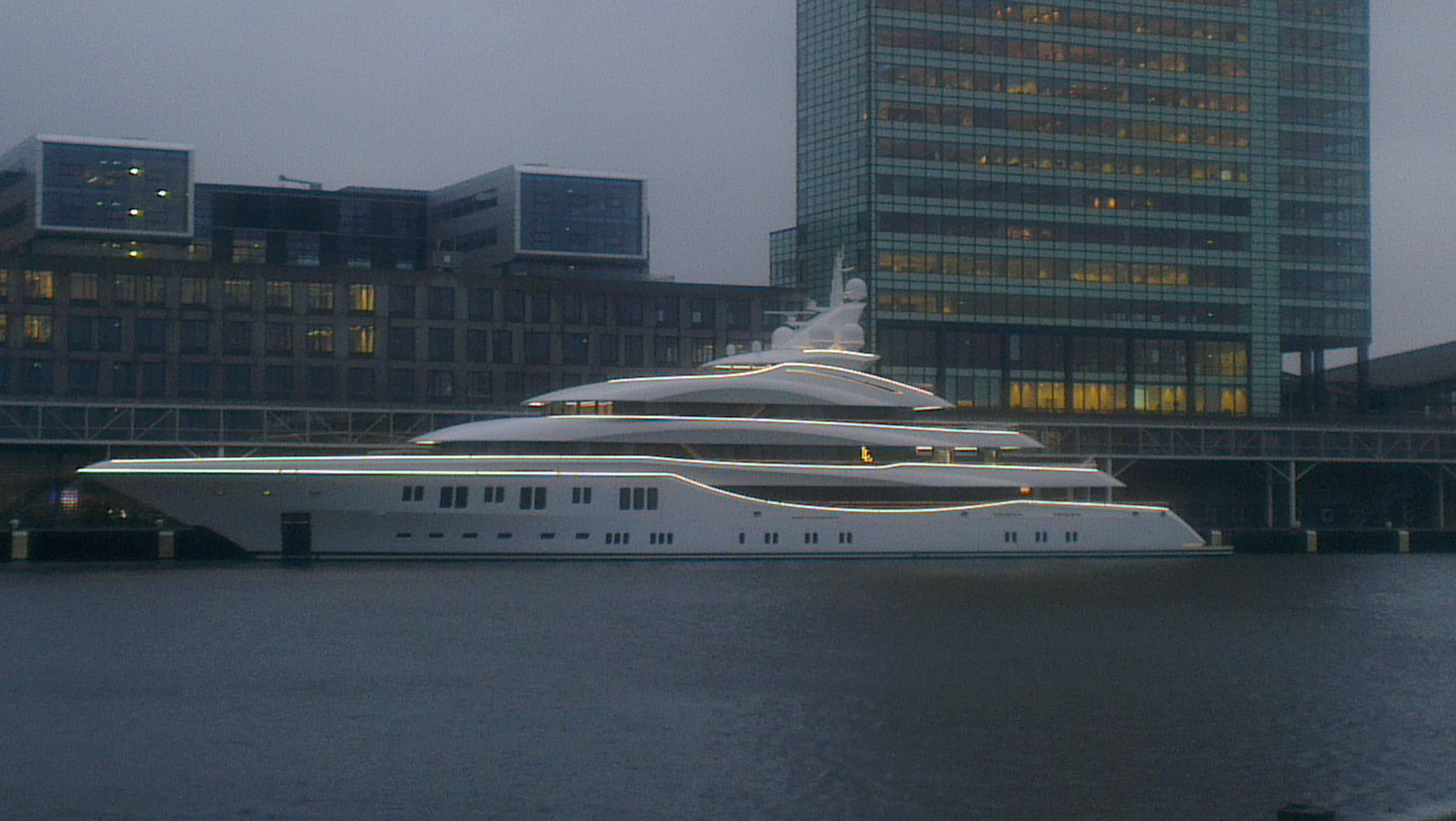

History

Cayman Islands
- Name: Lady Lara
- Operator: Alexander Mashkevitch
- Builder: Lürssen
- Launched: 2015
- In service: 2015
- Notes: IMO number: 1012311; MMSI number: 319082300; Call sign: ZGEZ3

General characteristics
- Class & type: Megayacht
- Tonnage: 2945 gross tons
- Length: 91.00 m (298.56 ft)
- Beam: 14.82 m (48.6 ft)
- Draught: 4.00 m (13.12 ft)
- Speed: 18 knots (33 km/h) (maximum); 12 knots (22 km/h) (cruising)
- Capacity: 14 passengers
- Crew: 19

Lady Lara is a motor yacht built in 2015 by Lürssen in Schacht-Audorf. She is owned by Israeli/Kazakh billionaire Alexander Mashkevitch. The vessel has an overall length of 91.00 m (298.56 ft) and a beam of 14.82 m (48.6 ft).

== Design ==
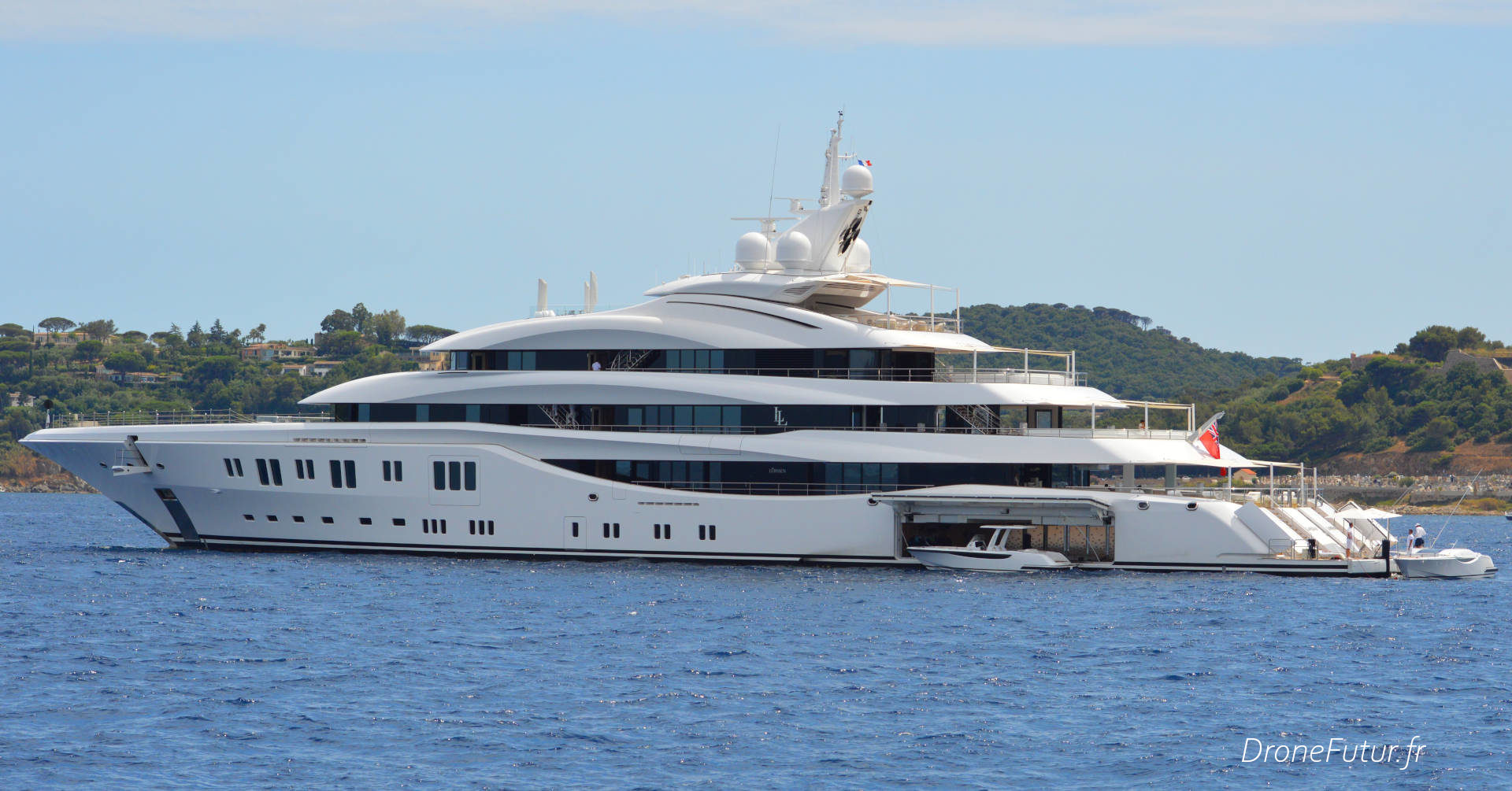
Lady Lara's exterior and interior were designed by Reymond Langton Design Ltd. The hull is built of steel and the superstructure is made of aluminium, with teak laid decks. The yacht is Lloyd's registered, issued by Cayman Islands.

=== Amenities ===
The yacht includes zero speed stabilizers, an elevator, beach club, helicopter landing pad on the bow, and spa. It also has a swimming platform, tender garage with tender, air conditioning, on deck jacuzzi, gym, and underwater lights.

== See also ==
- Luxury yacht
- List of motor yachts by length
- List of yachts built by Lürssen
