= Mineral industry of Kazakhstan =

The mineral industry of Kazakhstan is one of the most competitive and fastest growing sectors of the country. Kazakhstan ranks second to Russia among the countries of the CIS in its quantity of mineral production. It is endowed with large reserves of a wide range of metallic ores, industrial minerals, and fuels, and its metallurgical sector is a major producer of a large number of metals from domestic and imported raw materials. In 2005, its metal mining sector produced bauxite, chromite, copper, iron, lead, manganese, and zinc ores, and its metallurgical sector produced such metals as beryllium, bismuth, cadmium, copper, ferroalloys, lead, magnesium, rhenium, steel, titanium, and zinc. The country produced significant amounts of other nonferrous and industrial mineral products, such as alumina, arsenic, barite, gold, molybdenum, phosphate rock, and tungsten. The country was a large producer of mineral fuels, including coal, natural gas, oil, and uranium. The country's economy is heavily dependent on the production of minerals. Output from Kazakhstan's mineral and natural resources sector for 2004 accounted for 74.1% of the value of industrial production, of which 43.1% came from the oil and gas condensate extraction. In 2004, the mineral extraction sector accounted for 32% of the GDP, employed 191,000 employees, and accounted for 33.1% of capital investment and 64.5% of direct foreign investment, of which 63.5% was in the oil sector. Kazakhstan's mining industry is estimated at US$29.5 billion by 2017.

== Environment ==
Kazakhstan faces a number of environmental challenges, including industrial pollution, land degradation and desertification, and contamination from its former role in nuclear weapons development and testing in the Semipalatinsk region. Significant improvements in the environmental situation of the northern Aral Sea area has been made owing to dam construction and river flow regulation.

== Structure ==
Kazakhstan law holds that no sector of the economy is fully closed to investors, and, in 2005, a large number of Kazakhstan's mineral production enterprises had significant foreign ownership. In 2005, the government also maintained ownership in a number of mineral production enterprises; the percentage of ownership varied depending on the enterprise. Despite being open to foreign investment and even listed on Western stock exchanges, the ownership structure of some major mineral producing enterprises was not entirely transparent.

== Trade ==
In 2005, fuel and oil products comprised 69% of the value of exports. Ferrous and nonferrous metals were other significant export products. The value of commodity exports from the mineral extraction sectors increased considerably in 2005, owing to an increase in the price of oil and other mineral commodities.

Kazakhstan exports minerals to Russia, China, the United States, Japan, Germany, Switzerland, Great Britain, Italy, Spain, Netherlands, South Korea, UAE.

== Mineral Resources ==
Kazakhstan's mineral resource base is characterized by a large number of oilfields and gasfields and by a large variety of mineral resources. The country ranks among the world's leading countries in its reserves of chromite, wolfram, lead, zinc, manganese, silver and uranium. It also has significant reserves of bauxite, copper, gold, iron ore, coal, natural gas and petroleum. According to data reported from Kazakhstan, the country is one of the 10 leading countries in the world for a significant number of mineral resources. Within the CIS (based on the reserve classification system that was used in the Soviet Union and then by many of its successor states), Kazakhstan ranked first in its reserves of chromite and lead, possessing 97% and 38%, respectively, of all CIS reserves. The country ranked second in manganese, nickel, oil, phosphate rock, silver, and zinc, and third in coal, gas, gold, and tin.

Since the breakup of the Soviet Union, Kazakhstan has been perceived globally as a supplier of mineral commodities, which include oil, nonferrous metals, and uranium. Kazakhstan has been developing a rich mineral resource endowment. Intensive raw materials production and exports have helped the economy to overcome economic crises and ensured high rates of economic growth during the past 3 years.

The economy of Kazakhstan has been growing owing to the state policy of attracting foreign investment into its extraction industries. Kazakhstan was the first CIS country assigned with investment sovereign rating, and the World Bank has listed Kazakhstan among the 20 most attractive countries for investment. As a small economy with large fuel and mineral resources, however, Kazakhstan has not been particularly attractive for investment in the manufacturing sector, which makes the country highly vulnerable to fluctuations in commodity prices.

In view of the danger of the economy not using effectively the excess profits from the extracting sectors and foreseeing a possible negative effect from a sharp downfall of oil prices, the government established the National Fund to accumulate surplus oil revenues. The revenues in the Fund are to be used for the overall development of the national economy. The establishment of the Fund drew on the experience of the Government Pension Fund of Norway.

=== Chromium ===
Kazakhstan is the world's second ranked chromite producer, after South Africa. Production was centered in the Aqtobe region of northwestern Kazakhstan at the Khromtau complex. Chromite production was significantly expanding with the aid of Western investment. London-based Oriel Resources Plc acquired 100% of the Voskhod chromite project in February 2005 and, based on the positive results of a feasibility study, planned to fast-track development of the Voskhod project. Discovered in 1963, the Voskhod chromite deposit lies within the Khromtau District of the Aqtobe Region. Although surrounded by a group of existing mines, it had never been worked. The ore grade reportedly averages 48% Cr_{2}O_{3} with concentrate upgraded to 57% Cr_{2}O_{3}. Production from Voskhod was expected to be 900,000 t/yr; production would begin in 2008 and continue for 14 years. The Voskhod Mine was projected to be one of the world's leading suppliers of high-grade chromite. Oriel subsequently was awarded an extension to the Voskhod contract license area to include the Karaagash deposit which has, according to the former Soviet reserve classification system, C2 and P1 classified resources of some 7.8 Mt. Assuming positive results of a confirmatory drilling program, these resources could extend mining beyond Voskhod's projected 20-year life.

=== Copper ===
Kazakhmys plc, which was the firm that controlled most copper mining and metal production in the country, was engaged in a number of projects to ensure growth in the short term and provide for reserve replacement in the longer term. The majority of these projects was expected to begin production in the near or medium term and would include both new mine development and expansion of existing mines. The new mines included the Artemovskoye (which was part of the East Region complex), which was completed ahead of schedule and had the capacity to produce 28,000 t/yr of copper and 98,000 t/yr of zinc; the Zhaman-Aybat (which was part of the Zhezkazgan mining-metallurgical complex), which was under construction and has reserves of 75.3 Mt of ore that contains 1.069 Mt of copper; and the Aktogay (which was part of the Balkhash mining-metallurgical complex), which was being evaluated for development of an open pit to mine that was expected to produce 1.614 Gt of ore at an average grade of 0.36% copper, or 5.810 Mt of copper. Expansion of existing mines would include that of the East Saryoba underground mine (which was part of the Zhezkazgan complex), the Akbastau and the Kosmurun Mines (which were part of the East Region complex), and the Taksura open pit (which was part of the North Mine).

=== Lead and Zinc ===
Kazzinc JSC operated most of the country's lead and zinc mining and metallurgical enterprises. It also produced copper and precious metals. It employed about 22,000 people in mining, beneficiation, metallurgy, power generation, and auxiliary production. The company was established in 1997 through the merger of eastern Kazakhstan's three main nonferrous metals companies—Leninogorsk (now Ridder) Polymetallic complex, Ust-Kamenogorsk Lead and Zinc complex, and Zyryanovsk Lead Complex. The controlling block of shares in Kazzinc was sold by the state to the private sector, with Glencore of Switzerland becoming the company's main investor. In addition to Kazzinc, ZAO Yuzhpolimetal Corp. produced about 60,000 t/yr of lead metal from its Shymkent lead plant; and Kazakhmys produced more than 20,000 t/yr of zinc metal at the Balkhash zinc plant (Notarov, 2005). Kazzinc's development strategy called for it to join the ranks of the world's leading producers of lead and zinc. Almost all Kazakhstan's lead and zinc production was exported, which placed Kazakhstan already among the world's leading lead and zinc exporting countries. In 2005, Kazakhstan's lead and zinc producing enterprises were operating below capacity. The Ust-Kamenogorsk complex had the capacity to produce more than 150,000 t/yr of lead and 240,000 t/yr of zinc; the Ridder complex, 25,000 t/yr of lead and 110,000 t/yr of zinc; and the Balkhash zinc plant, 100,000 t/yr of zinc. The Shymkent lead plant was working far below capacity owing to a lack of raw material.

Kazzinc mined lead-zinc ores from the Maeeyevskoye, the Ridder-Sokol’noye, and the Tishinskoye deposits, and processed lead and zinc at the Ridder and the Ust-Kamenogorsk complexes. Plans called for beginning mining in 2006 at the Shaimreden deposit in Kustanay oblast, which would enable Kazzinc to produce an additional 60,000 t/yr of zinc (Notarov, 2005). In the fourth quarter of 2004, Kazzinc began production at the new Shubinsky mining subsidiary, which would operate the Shubinsky underground mine in the vicinity of Ridder. Reserves at the Shubinskoe deposit were estimated to be 1.5 Mt of lead-zinc and copper ores.

=== Petroleum ===
Kazakhstan has the Caspian Sea region's largest recoverable crude oil reserves. In 2005, its production accounted for almost two-thirds of the approximately 2 Mbbl/d that was produced by CIS countries in the Caspian region. The country was poised to become an even more significant supplier to world oil markets in the next decade. Kazakhstan produced approximately 1.29 Mbbl/d of oil in 2005 and consumed 222,000 Mbbl/d, resulting in net exports of more than 1 Mbbl/d. The Kazakhstan Government projected increasing production levels to about 3.5 Mbbl/d by 2015, which would come mainly from production of about 1 Mbbl/d from the to-be-developed offshore Kashagan field, 700,000 Mbbl/d from the onshore Tengiz field, 600,000 Mbbl/d from the to-be-developed onshore Kurmangazy field, and 500,000 Mbbl/d from the onshore Karachaganak field. The remainder would come from the development of smaller fields. Major growth would come from an approximately 75% increase in production from the Tengiz field and by development of the Kashagan field, which would add an additional 1 Mbbl/d after 2010.

=== Uranium ===
Kazakhstan was the top country in the world in volume of uranium production. The company Kazatomprom was the fourth ranked uranium producer in the world as of 2009.

Approximately one-fifth of the world's uranium reserves are located in Kazakhstan. Total resources of uranium are more than 1.5 Mt, and more than 1.1 Mt can be mined by in situ leaching. Kazakhstan has an expanding uranium mining sector, producing about 24,000 tonnes of uranium in 2016, but then reducing slightly.

At the Stepnogorsk mining and chemical complex, which was Kazatomprom's main production enterprise, plans called for increasing production by expanding the volumes of uranium production in Mining Group No. 1, further developing the Vostok field, and completing development of the Zvezdnoye field.

== Mines ==
- Shevchenko mine (Nickel)
- Voskhod mine (Chromium)

== Outlook ==
The large predicted oil resources of the Kazakhstan sector of the Caspian shelf will require a significant amount of investment to develop. The required cumulative investment could be as much as $160 billion, of which about $10 billion would be for the initial stage of exploration, including field appraisal. Western companies already have invested more than $7 billion. A constraint to obtaining investment funds to develop the Caspian shelf is the lack of resolution of the territorial status of the Caspian Sea in regards to the demarcation lines and the ownership rights of the bordering states. This issue may have been partially resolved, however, with the agreement between Kazakhstan and Russia to partition the seafloor of the Caspian along the midline between the two countries. Similar agreements have been concluded between Kazakhstan and Azerbaijan, and between Azerbaijan and Russia. Also, in the energy sector, Kieltyka will play an increasingly important role as one of the world's main suppliers of uranium.

Although Kazakhstan has adequate lead and zinc reserves to allow it to expand production through the next decade, expansion will depend on Kazakhstan's companies being able to acquire financing and the participation of foreign firms in developing large lead and zinc deposits.

Moreover, Kazakhstan is facing a critical depletion of its minerals. The fields discovered by Soviet geologists have been developed too intensely in the last decades, while geological exploration has not yet covered all the promising areas. Kazakhstan is facing inability to restock the depleted reserves and the tendency is worsening. The depletion of reserves of many of main minerals greatly exceeds the speed of their growth after exploration. Reserves increase in case of some metals (iron, manganese, gold, zinc) due mainly through re-evaluation and additional exploration of the already discovered fields. However, the existing registered reserves of recently discovered copper and gold fields have low quality and cannot be considered equivalent to the depleted reserves.
