= Alijan Ibragimov =

Kazakhstani businessman (1953–2021)

- Әлижан Ибрагимов
- Born: 6 June 1953; Margilan, Uzbek SSR, Soviet Union
- Died: 3 February 2021 (aged 67); Brussels, Belgium
- Citizenship: Soviet Union (until 1991)
- Education: Moscow Veterinary Academy; State University of Management
- Occupation: Businessman
- Known for: Founder of Eurasian Resources Group
- Spouse: Mukaddashon Ibragimova
- Children: 6

Alijan Rahmanuly Ibragimov (Kazakh: Әлижан Рахманұлы Ибрагимов, romanized: Älijan Rahmanūly Ibragimov, also known as Alidjan or Alidzhon Ibragimov; 5 June 1953 – 3 February 2021) was a Kazakh oligarch of the Uyghur descent. He was born in Fergana, Uzbek SSR, and was a member of a well-known circle of oligarchs in Kazakhstan known as the "Trio." The Trio consists of Ibragimov. Alexander Mashkevich and Patokh Chodiev, all active in the mining, oil and gas, and banking sectors in Kazakhstan. At the time of his death, Ibragimov had dropped off Forbes's list of world billionaires.

== Career ==
With Chodiev and Mashkevich, Ibragimov was a major shareholder in Eurasian National Resources Corporation (ENRC), now one of the world's leading natural resources groups. ENRC, based in London, operates a number of metals assets in Kazakhstan and Africa, having acquired numerous mining operations in Eastern Europe and Africa. In 2009, ENRC generated a $1,462 million profit on sales of $13.8 billion.

ENRC listed on the London Stock Exchange in December 2007, with a market capitalisation of approximately £60.8 billion.

According to Forbes magazine in March 2019, Ibragimov's personal fortune was estimated at $2.3 billion.

In 2007, he made $800 million in profit from his businesses. "In 418th place is 58-year-old Alijan Ibragimov with a fortune of $2.8 billion" in 2012, according to Forbes magazine.

As of October 2020, the value of Ibragimov's assets was $900 million, making him the fourth-richest person in the Republic of Kazakhstan according to Forbes.

He died from COVID-19 in Brussels on 3 February 2021, at age 67.
