= Patokh Chodiev =

Belgian-Uzbek oligarch and philanthropist (born 1953)

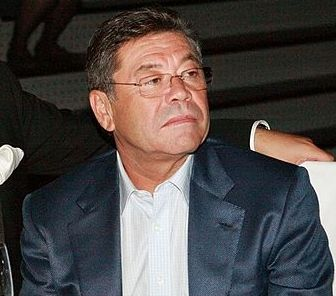
- Born: 15 April 1953 (age 73); Djizak, Uzbek SSR, Soviet Union
- Education: Moscow State Institute of International Relations
- Occupations: Entrepreneur and philanthropist
- Awards: Order of Kurmet and Order of Friendship

Patokh Chodiev (Russian: Фа́ттох Каюмович Шо́диев; Fáttoh Kayúmovich Shódiev; born 15 April 1953) is a Belgian-Uzbek oligarch and philanthropist.

He enriched himself in the aftermath of the collapse of the Soviet Union, as he, Alexander Mashkevich and Alijan Ibragimov, obtained mineral and gas operations when they were privatized in Kazakhstan. They founded the company Eurasian Natural Resources Corp.

Chodiev was on the Forbes list of billionaires, before dropping off in 2020. The Pandora Papers leaks revealed at least 25 offshore companies linked to Chodiev. He received several decorations from Russia and Japan for his philanthropic actions and patronage of education, intercultural relations and the arts.

== Biography ==
=== Early life and education ===
Patokh Chodiev was born in Uzbekistan. He studied international law and Japanese at the Moscow State Institute of International Relations (MGIMO), graduating with a doctorate in political science. Speaking Japanese fluently, he joined the diplomatic service specializing in Russian-Japanese commercial relations and subsequently lived in Tokyo for a few years.

=== Economic activities ===
Together with Alexander Mashkevich and Alijan Ibragimov, Chodiev runs various ventures in the minerals sector in Kazakhstan, Africa and Brazil. In 2007, their enterprise was floated on the London Stock Exchange and became part of the FTSE 100 in 2008. In 2009, Eurasian Natural Resources Corporation (ENRC), one of the world's leading natural resource companies, of which Chodiev is a major shareholder, generated a profit of $1.462 billion from a turnover of $3.8 billion. Based in London, ENRC exploited a number of mineral deposits in Kazakhstan and Africa after acquiring numerous mining operations in Eastern Europe and Africa. In November 2013, the company was renamed "Eurasian Resources Group" (ERG) and is registered in Luxembourg as a company specializing in natural resources. In 2017, ERG posted earnings before interest, taxes, depreciation and amortization of $2 billion, and received an improved credit rating by international rating agency Standard and Poor's from B− to B on 29 June 2018, following a "positive outlook" for the metals market.

=== Philanthropic actions ===
In 1996, he established an international charitable organization with the initial goal of providing grants and scholarship programs to assist students at the Moscow State Institute of International Relations (MGIMO). The International Chodiev Foundation has since evolved into an international philanthropic center for academic research, the arts, and children's causes (humanitarian and health assistance to orphanages, education, etc.).

ICF is one of the oldest charitable foundations in modern Russia. It operates in Ukraine, Russia, Kazakhstan, Uzbekistan and Japan.

In September 2017, the Chodiev Foundation registered a representative office in Uzbekistan, in order to provide humanitarian assistance and healthcare to orphanages in the country. Reports also stated that Chodiev plans to build several shopping malls as well as a metallurgical plant in Tashkent as part of an investment push into Uzbekistan.

=== Obtaining Belgian citizenship ===
On 27 June 1997 Patokh Chodiev acquired Belgian citizenship. This led to a debate in the media about how his naturalization was obtained, since Chodiev does not speak any of the three official languages of Belgium (Dutch, French or German) fluently. Furthermore, the Belgian State Security Service expressed concerns about Chodiev's relations to other Russian businessmen, but eventually found "nothing to report."

Patokh Chodiev was also accused of having received help in this matter from the mayor of Waterloo, Serge Kubla. His Belgian naturalization was finally the subject of an official inquiry in January 2017, about which the Belgian newspaper Le Soir wrote on 11 January 2017: "When Serge Kubla wrote to Claude Eerdekens on 16 May 1997, all the lights were already green for Chodiev: he had the support of the SPF Justice, the State Security Service, the Aliens Department, the Waterloo police and the Public Prosecutor's Office, and therefore also that of the naturalization service". On 8 March 2017, Serge Kubla assured "under oath" not to have intervened on Chodiev's behalf. Chief investigator of the case, Jean-François Kayser, stated that "there is no evidence of Mr. Kubla's physical intervention with Mr. Vandewalle", referring to the Chief Commissioner of the Waterloo police.

=== Legal action against Georges Gilkinet ===
Between 2017 and 2018 in the context of the parliamentary commission of inquiry on the expanded criminal transaction named "Kazakhgate commission", the conditions for obtaining the nationality of Patokh Chodiev are again debated. Georges Gilkinet, Ecolo deputy, then vice-chairman and very active member of the commission of inquiry, made a series of incriminating remarks, defaming the billionaire. He repeated his remarks in La Libre Belgique, Vif l'Express and Plus Magazine, immediately prompting several legal actions by the businessman.

On 30 April 2018, a parliamentary commission of inquiry concluded unanimously that Chodiev's naturalization procedures had not been influenced by Serge Kubla. The commission also cleared Chodiev of any involvement in the passing of the penal transaction law. Chodiev's lawyer has accused the commission of having been biased against Chodiev. However, through his lawyer, Chodiev said he is willing to drop a formal complaint against several commission members on the condition that he receive a letter from a representative of the Belgian authorities admitting that the commission had operated inappropriately, subjected Chodiev to "slander", and acknowledging the negative impact of the investigation on Chodiev and his family.

On 19 June 2019 the Namur court of first instance declared Chodiev's complaint against Ecolo MP Georges Gilkinet inadmissible and unfounded. During the following week, Chodiev's lawyers announced that their client would appeal the decision.

On 28 January 2021 the Court of Appeal of Liège condemned Georges Gilkinet, who had become Deputy Prime Minister, for his defamatory remarks. On 24 November 2022 the Court of Cassation confirms the basis of the judicial condemnation of Georges Gilkinet, thus giving reason to Patokh Chodiev.

== Other press quotes ==
In 1999, the energy company Tractebel lodged a complaint against two of its employees, accusing them of embezzling part of the $55 million in consulting fees paid by Tractebel to Patokh Chodiev and his two associates. Separate to this case, the three partners were under investigation in Belgium on suspicions of forgery and money laundering, but the Brussels public prosecutor dropped any proceedings on 17 June 2011, within the framework of the extension to the criminal transaction law. As such the three paid a lump sum settlement of 522,500 euros. A representative of the Brussels prosecutor's office confirmed to the Financial Times in August 2011 that no legal case against Chodiev and his associates had been active since June that year and that the case was considered settled. According to the representative, no judgement had been made against Chodiev, Mashkevich and Ibragimov who "are therefore presumed innocent."

Patokh Chodiev was named among the 732 Belgians linked to offshore companies when the Panama Papers scandal broke in April 2016.

In 2018, ENRC was accused of engaging in bribery to obtain mining rights in Kazakhstan and Africa.

In 2022, ENRC sued a British journalist for his book Kleptopia: How Dirty Money is Conquering the World. According to ENRC, the book suggested that ENRC was involved in the deaths of three ENRC employees. A judge dismissed the lawsuit.

=== Distinctions ===
In 2019, Chodiev receives the title of "Patron of the Year" from the Russian Ministry of Culture within the framework of the Eighth International Cultural Forum of the city of Saint Petersburg for financing the Russian tour of "Traditional Japanese Kabuki Theater".

In 2020, Patokh Chodiev was awarded the Order of Friendship (Russia), in recognition of his patronage of education, intercultural relations and the arts and the Order of the Rising Sun (First Class) (Japan) for its active and long-term contribution to the development of economic and cultural ties between Japan and Russia.
