= Eurasian Natural Resources Corporation =

UK natural resources company

Eurasian Natural Resources Corporation PLC
- Company type: Privately held company (1994–2007); Public limited company (2007–2013); Subsidiary (2013–present)
- Industry: Metals and Mining
- Founded: 1994 (in its current form from 2006)
- Fate: Taken private as Eurasian Resources Group in 2013
- Headquarters: London, United Kingdom
- Products: Ferrochrome; Ferroalloys; Iron Ore; Alumina; Aluminium; Coal; Power Generation; Copper; Cobalt
- Revenue: US$6,320 million (2012) (Note: Preliminary Results 2012)
- Operating income: US$ (374) million (2012)
- Net income: US$ (852) million (2012)
- Number of employees: Over 72,000 (2011)
- Website: www.enrc.com

Eurasian Natural Resources Corporation PLC (ENRC) was a public, Kazakhstan/Central African-focused, multinational leading diversified natural resources company headquartered in London, United Kingdom. It had activities in integrated mining, processing, energy, logistics and marketing.

ENRC was formed in 1994, listed on the London Stock Exchange in 2006, and delisted after a near six-year spell in November 2013. A secondary listing and subsequent de-listing also took place on the Kazakhstan Stock Exchange.

ENRC is now a fully owned subsidiary of the Eurasian Resources Group (ERG), a private natural resources company headquartered in Luxembourg. This private company incorporates the assets of former FTSE-100 group, ENRC PLC, which it acquired in November 2013.

== History ==
=== Major events ===
The company was founded by circle of oligarchs in Kazakhstan known as the "Trio" in 1994. The Trio consisted of Alijan Ibragimov, Alexander Mashkevitch and Patokh Chodiev, all active in the mining, oil and gas, and banking sectors in Kazakhstan. The assets of the company were acquired as part of the privatization process in Kazakhstan.

The company in its present form was established in 2006 as part of a re-organisation to consolidate a series of businesses into one group.

The company floated around 18% of its equity on the London Stock Exchange in December 2007.

In December 2009 the Company completed acquisition of the Central African Mining Exploration Company (CAMEC). CAMEC's operations incorporate the assets of copper and cobalt in the Democratic Republic of Congo, the development projects of coal in Mozambique, bauxite in Mali, platinum in Zimbabwe, and fluorspar in South Africa, as well as trucking and logistics business across the African continent. CAMEC's Mukondo Mine may be the richest cobalt reserve in the world. Copper from Mukondo is refined at the Luita plant, with planned capacity of 100,000 tonnes per year of copper cathode. In July 2009 CAMEC announced a long-term agreement under which CAMEC would deliver its entire annual production of cobalt in concentrate from Mukondo Mountain to Zhejiang Galico Cobalt & Nickel Materials of China.

In February 2010 ENRC acquired a 90% interest in Chambishi Metals PLC, a smelting facility in Zambia, together with a 100% interest in Comit Resources FZE, a Dubai-based marketing and sales company that historically has handled Chambishi's copper and cobalt sales. In August 2010 company acquired 50.5% of Camrose Resources Limited ('Camrose'). Camrose held five high quality copper and cobalt mining permits in the Democratic Republic of Congo (DRC). They include the Kolwezi tailings project, which the DRC government had confiscated from First Quantum Minerals (FQM). FQM had spent C$750 million developing the Kolwezi assets. ENRC paid $175 million for its majority stake in Camrose.

In September 2010 ENRC acquired the outstanding 50% interest in Bahia Minerals BV and in October 2010 – 100% of Mineração Minas Bahia SA (MIBA) and 51% of Mineração Peixe Bravo SA (MPB).

In March 2013 ENRC was forced to write down a US$1.5bn (£1bn) loss due largely to an "onerous" locked in contract with the Russian aluminium company, Rusal with whom they must provide aluminium at what is now below market price (Telegraph 2013).

On 21 April 2013, The Sunday Times revealed that three founders, Alexander Mashkevitch, Patokh Chodiev and Alijan Ibragimov, were behind a possible takeover bid for ENRC. Following this news, three senior executives resigned, and a fourth announced a leave of absence. These included the Head of Human Resources and the Company Secretary. On 23 April Mehmet Dalman, the chairman of ENRC, also resigned and next day the group confirmed that Gerhard Ammann, a non-executive director of ENRC and president of Bank Von Roll, a Swiss private bank, would replace Mr Dalman.

The Serious Fraud Office launched a criminal investigation into ENRC's business practices in April 2013.

ENRC annual report released on 30 April said that UK authorities are investigating whether ENRC breached Britain's rules for listed companies, specifically with acquisitions made in the Democratic Republic of Congo and a 2012 sale of railway line repair company Zhol Zhondeushi to a company connected to the family of one of the miner's co-founders.

In November 2013 ENRC de-listed from the LSE after the group's founders gained acceptances from 96.7 percent of shareholders for their offer - of $2.65 in cash and 0.23 of a Kazakhmys share for each one in ENRC - to acquire the company along with the Kazakh government.

In February 2014, it was reported that the firm would have to sell its international assets, including its lucrative copper mines in the Democratic Republic of Congo, after the company's founders came under increased pressure to repay the large loan they had taken out to privatise ENRC.

== Operations ==
ENRC operates in Kazakhstan, China, Russia, Brazil and Africa (the Democratic Republic of Congo, Zambia, Mozambique and South Africa). The group incorporates six Divisions (ENRC 2013): Ferroalloys, Iron Ore, Alumina and Aluminium, Energy, Other Non-ferrous, Logistics

=== Ferroalloys ===
ENRC's largest division is its Ferroalloys Division (ENRC 2013). ENRC is one of the world's largest ferrochrome producers (ENRC 2013). ENRC's Kazchrome in the Republic of Kazakhstan, integrates four operating companies: Donskoy Ore Mining & Processing Plant, Aktobe Ferroalloys Plant, Aksu Ferroalloys Plant and Kazmarganets Mining Enterprise. ENRC's Zhairem GOK, one of the "largest manganese ore mining and processing plants" in Kazakhstan, is a "major supplier of manganese and ferromanganese concentrates to customers throughout Russia, Ukraine, Central Asia and China (ENRC 2013)."

=== Energy ===
The ENRC is one of the largest electricity providers in Kazakhstan, accounting for approximately 16.3% of the country's recorded electricity production in 2011.

=== ENRC operations in the Republic of Kazakhstan ===
The ENRC's assets in the Republic of Kazakhstan comprise Kazchrome, Zhairem GOK, SSGPO, Aluminium of Kazakhstan, Kazakhstan Aluminium Smelter (KAS)

ENRC is one of the world's largest ferrochrome producers (ENRC 2013). ENRC's Kazchrome in the Republic of Kazakhstan, integrates four operating companies: Donskoy Ore Mining & Processing Plant, Aktobe Ferroalloys Plant, Aksu Ferroalloys Plant and Kazmarganets Mining Enterprise.

Contributing significantly to Kazakhstan's GDP, one of the world's significant exporters of iron ore; the world's ninth largest producer of traded alumina; and one of the largest electricity providers in Kazakhstan.

ENRC is one of Kazakhstan's largest companies, accounting for approximately 3% of Kazakhstan's GDP in 2009. ENRC currently employs over 70,000 people, of which 65,000 are located in Kazakhstan.

==== ENRC acquisition of Central African Mining Exploration Company (CAMEC) ====
In December 2009 ENRC acquired 95.40% of the shares of Central African Mining Exploration Company (CAMEC) CAMEC's operations incorporate the assets of copper and cobalt in the Democratic Republic of Congo, the development projects of coal in Mozambique, bauxite in Mali, platinum in Zimbabwe, and fluorspar in South Africa, as well as trucking and logistics business across the African continent. ENRC had made a £584-million cash offer in September 2008 (Webb 18 September 2009). The chairperson Phillippe Edmonds and CEO Andrew Groves both resigned when the deal was closed in November 2009.

CAMEC's Mukondo Mine may be the richest cobalt reserve in the world. Copper from Mukondo is refined at the Luita plant, with planned capacity of 100,000 tonnes per year of copper cathode. In July 2009 CAMEC announced a long-term agreement under which CAMEC would deliver its entire annual production of cobalt in concentrate from Mukondo Mountain to Zhejiang Galico Cobalt & Nickel Materials of China.

==== ENRC acquisition of Camrose Resources Limited ====
ENRC's acquisition 50.5% of Kolwezi Mine Tailings (KWT) a "multi-billion dollar copper and cobalt tailings reprocessing facility" that had been expropriated in 2009 by the DRC from Vancouver, Canada-based First Quantum Minerals through Dan Gertler's newly formed British Virgin Island-based company, Highwinds, was the last of a series of ENRC of Congolese mining asset acquisitions in roughly an 11-month period. First Quantum Minerals had completed 75 per cent of the construction and the lucrative facility was almost ready to be operational when it was seized by the government and handed to This led to First Quantum Minerals v Highwinds and others, a case concerning the expropriation of mining licences in the Democratic Republic of Congo. DRC passed the concession to a new joint venture Metalkol Sarl, encompassing state-owned Gecamines (30%) and Dan Gertler's newly formed British Virgin Island-based company, Highwinds (70%).

Camrose Resources Limited ('Camrose') "owned British Virgin Island-based new company, Highwind Group which had a 70% interest in the Metalkol Sarl, which in turn owned the exploitation licence for the Kolwezi tailings site (Law Expert 2 March 2012)." Camrose's other assets included a "64% stake in Canada listed Africo Resources which held a 75% interest in Kalukundi exploitation licence as well as 56% indirect interest in Comide Sprl, which held the exploitation licence for Mashitu, Pangalume and Kii tenements."

The Kolwezi tailings project, is a lucrative copper- and cobalt-extractions projects mining older mines' tailings ponds, partly owned and operated by First Quantum Minerals, a Vancouver, British Columbia based mining and metals company, until its forced closure in September 2009 when the DRC government revoked its license and confiscated the holdings. First Quantum spent $750 million on acquiring and developing the property. First Quantum took out an action against the DRC government in the International Chamber of Commerce Court of Arbitration.

Fasken Martineau, a leading international business law and litigation firm recovered an almost unprecedented US$1.25B in the dispute between First Quantum Minerals and the DRC. As part of the settlement Eurasian Natural Resources Corporation (ENRC) purchased First Quantum's residual claims and assets in the DRC.

In August 2010 ENRC acquired 50.5% of Camrose Resources Limited ('Camrose'), which at that time held a 70% indirect interest in Metalkol Sarl, owner of the Kolwezi copper tailings project. In 2010 ENRC paid $175 million for its majority stake in Camrose. On 28 December 2012, 99 percent of Eurasian Natural Resources Corp shareholders approved the US$550 million purchase of the remaining 49.5% per cent of Camrose Resources Limited still held by Dan Gertler's Gibraltar-registered (Wild et al. 2013 page 68) Fleurette Properties Ltd.

=== ENRC operations in Zambia ===
In February 2010 ENRC purchased a 90% interest in Chambishi Metals PLC, a copper and cobalt producer and smelter located in Zambia.

=== ENRC operations in Russia ===
On 4 April 2008 Eurasian Natural Resources Corporation PLC finalized the purchase, first signed on 4 December 2007, of the controlling interest in Serov Ferrochrome Producer (Serov SPA) in Sverdlovsk region, eastern Russia for US$210 million from various entities affiliated with Mr. P Chodiev, Mr. An Ibragimov and Mr. A Machkevitch, founding shareholders in ENRC. Sir David Cooksey, the Non-Executive Chairman of ENRC noted this was ENRC's first transaction outside of Kazakhstan. The purchase agreement (4 December 2007) gives ENRC the economic benefit from all dividends and distributions made after 4 December 2007. The acquisition will provide a strong platform for ENRC in Russia. The purchase provided vertical integration with companies that ENRC operates: Serov Ferrochrome Factory, Saranovskaya Mine Rudnaya and Serov Metalconcentrate Works. Dr. Johannes Sittard, chief executive officer of ENRC, described how the purchase of Serov gave ENRC an asset base and strong platform in Russia. (Note: "ENRC Regulatory News". Russia: ENRC. 4 April 2008.)

== Corporate affairs ==
In April 2008 the Founder Shareholders of Eurasian Natural Resources Corporation Group "ultimately indirectly owned equally" Industrial Metals Technology Limited, Chesswood Holdings Limited, Blackmore Holdings Limited, Prentice Holdings Limited, Cretown Corporate Advisory BV, International Mineral Resources BV ('IMR') Serov Ferrochrome Producer (Serov SPA). Mr. P Chodiev, Mr. An Ibragimov and Mr. A Machkevitch were Founder Shareholders of Eurasian Natural Resources Corporation Group. Johannes Sittard, was the chief executive officer of ENRC and Sir David Cooksey was the Non-Executive Chairman of ENRC.

=== Senior management ===
ENRC's senior management team consisted of:

Mr Mehmet Dalman	Chairman and non-executive director
Mr Felix Vulis	Chief Executive Officer
Ms Zaure Zaurbekova	Chief Financial Officer
Mr Jim Cochrane	Chief Commercial Officer, Head of Sales & Marketing and Logistics
Mr Beat Ehrensberger	General Counsel
Mrs Victoria Penrice	Company Secretary
Ms Mounissa Chodieva	Head of Investor & Public Relations

Upon the acquisition by ERG, many of the previous senior management did not transfer to the new group, left their positions or were replaced in a new structure.

=== Ownership ===
ENRC is now owned fully by ERG (Eurasian Resources Group), a private company headquartered in Luxembourg, Grand Duchy of Luxembourg. Alexander Machkevitch is chairman of the board of directors and Mr Benedikt Sobotka is chief executive officer. The ERG is 40% owned by the Kazakhstan government.

== See also ==
- Camrose Resources Limited
- Central African Mining and Exploration Company
- Ferroalloys
- Katanga Plateau
- Mining in the Democratic Republic of the Congo
- Mukondo Mine
