= Trafigura =

Singapore-based multinational commodity trading company

Trafigura Group Pte. Ltd.
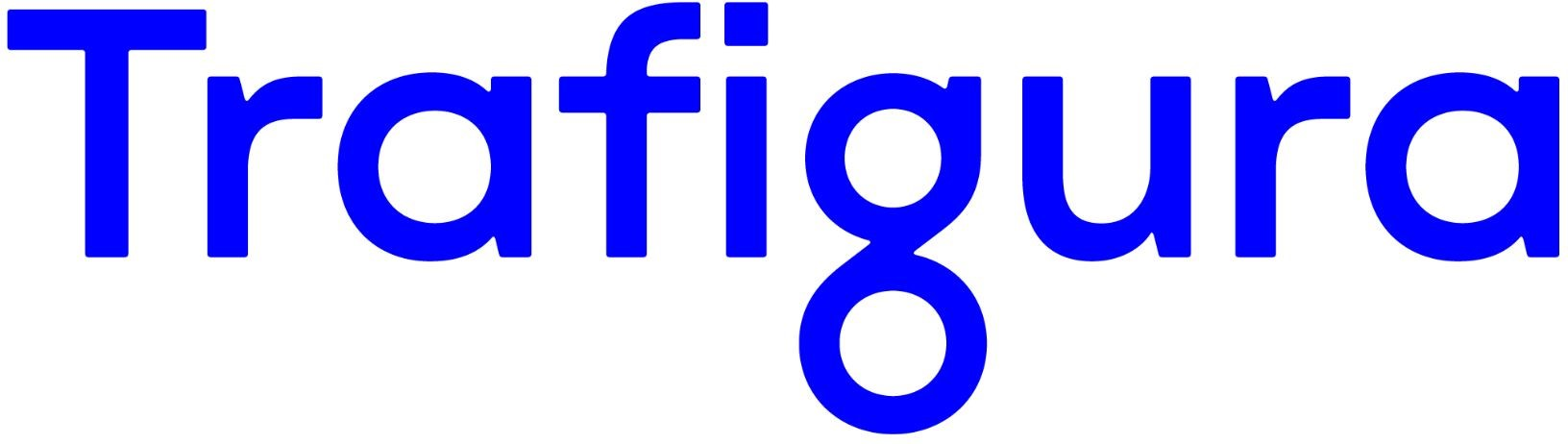
- Type: Private
- Industry: Commodity trading; Energy; Logistics
- Founded: 1993; 33 years ago
- Headquarters: Ocean Financial Centre, Singapore
- Area served: Worldwide
- Key people: Jeremy Weir (Group Chairman); Richard Holtum (CEO)
- Products: Crude oil & petroleum products; Natural gas & LNG; Non-ferrous metals & minerals; Renewable energy & power; Biofuels
- Services: Physical commodity trading; Supply chain management & logistics; Shipping & chartering; Terminals & warehousing; Asset management
- Revenue: ▼US$240.3 billion (FY2025)
- Operating income: ▼US$4.18 billion (FY2025)
- Net income: ▼US$2.67 billion (FY2025)
- Total assets: ▲US$79.5 billion (FY2025)
- Total equity: ▼US$16.2 billion (FY2025)
- Number of employees: ~12,000 (2025)
- Subsidiaries: Puma Energy; Nyrstar; Galena Asset Management; Impala Terminals; Nala Renewables; Greenergy
- Website: www.trafigura.com

Trafigura Group Pte. Ltd. is a Singaporean‑based multinational commodities company, founded in 1993, with major regional hubs in Geneva, Houston, Montevideo, and Mumbai. The company trades in base metals and energy. It is the world's largest private metal trader and the second‑largest oil trader, having built or purchased stakes in pipelines, mines, smelters, ports, and storage terminals.

Trafigura was formed in Geneva by Claude Dauphin and Eric de Turckheim in 1993, but quickly split off from a group of companies managed by Marc Rich.

Trafigura has been named in or been involved in several scandals, most notably the 2006 Ivory Coast toxic waste dump (which left up to 100,000 people with skin rashes, headaches, and respiratory problems) and the Iraq Oil‑for‑Food scandal.

== History ==
Trafigura Beheer BV was established as a private group of companies in 1993 by six founding partners: Claude Dauphin, Eric de Turckheim, Graham Sharp, Antonio Cometti, Daniel Posen, and Mark Crandall.

Initially focused on three regional markets – South America (oil and minerals), Eastern Europe (metals), and Africa (oil) – Trafigura has since diversified and expanded globally. In 1999, Trafigura Beheer BV, a unit based in the Netherlands, became the first company to obtain a contract to sell Sudan's oil internationally.

In November 2013, it was announced that the Tory peer and former leader of the House of Lords, Lord Strathclyde, would be joining Trafigura as a non‑executive director. He had previously stood down from the board of the group’s hedge fund arm following the 2009 controversy over the Côte d'Ivoire incident.

Executive chairman Claude Dauphin, the last remaining founder in an executive position, owned less than 20 per cent of the group’s equity at his death in September 2015, while more than 700 senior managers controlled the rest. Dauphin was succeeded by Jeremy Weir, who, in 2025, will assume the role of Group Chairman, while Richard Holtum will take the helm as CEO from January 2025, according to the company's succession plan. Holtum, a ten‑year veteran of the firm and its global head of gas, power, and renewables, will join Trafigura's board of directors in October 2024.

As of 2015, Trafigura operated in 65 offices across 36 countries. In 2023, revenue was $244.3 billion, net income was $7.4 billion, assets were $90.5 billion, and equity was $16.5 billion. In 2024, the company had around 12,000 employees operating in 150 countries, with 50 offices, and is wholly owned by approximately 1,400 of its employees.

In February 2023, Trafigura reported $577 million in losses from fraudulent shipments it had purchased that were supposed to contain nickel but instead contained much lower‑value materials such as carbon steel. The firm was alerted to possible fraud when cargoes it had purchased, purportedly containing nickel, began taking longer than expected to reach their destinations and were making more port calls than anticipated, while sellers delayed providing documentation. In December 2022, Trafigura investigators inspected purported nickel shipments in Rotterdam and discovered the fraud. The group's head of nickel and cobalt trading, Socrates Economou, left the company, but Trafigura stated that it did not believe anyone at the company was complicit in the fraud. The firm initiated legal action against the sellers involved. In January 2026, the London High Court ruled that "Trafigura was the victim of fraud on a grand scale devised and implemented by Prateek Gupta using the Corporate Defendants", and awarded Trafigura $500 million in relief plus substantial damages. The judge also ruled that the former Trafigura employees who had been embroiled in the case, Sokratis Oikonomou and Harshdeep Bhatia, were "wholly innocent of any wrongdoing". In February 2026, the London High Court increased the damages Gupta must pay to Trafigura to $700 million, plus legal costs.

In October 2024, the company reported that individuals in its Mongolian petroleum products supply business had, over a five‑year period, concealed overdue debts and manipulated data, resulting in inflated sums being paid by Trafigura. Local regulations require international fuel supplier deliveries to stop at the border, necessitating local operatives for deliveries to the domestic market. The company recorded a writedown of $1.1 billion resulting from the misconduct by staff in its Mongolian office. Banks asked Trafigura to include an explanation of events in Mongolia and its remediation plan in the presentation for its European revolving credit facility to be launched in early 2025. Trafigura said it discovered the problems in Mongolia through the compliance overhaul and tighter risk controls it had implemented as a result of the nickel fraud of which it had been the victim in 2023.

=== Investments ===
In 2003, the group established its fund management subsidiary, Galena Asset Management. In 2010, Trafigura bought 8% of Norilsk Nickel.

In 2007, an explosion in Sløvåg in Gulen Municipality, Sogn og Fjordane county, Norway in a tank owned by the company Vest Tank had severe environmental and health consequences for people living nearby. According to the Norwegian Broadcasting Corporation, Vest Tank was trying to neutralize chemical waste when the explosion occurred, and the owner of the waste was Trafigura, on whose behalf Vest Tank was working. Trafigura was not accused of direct responsibility, and refused requests by the Norwegian police to interview employees.

In February 2013, Trafigura invested $800 million in the Australian energy market, acquiring more than 250 petrol stations, two oil import terminals and five fuel depots in three separate acquisitions by its subsidiary Puma Energy. At the time, there was interest in Australia among energy traders due to a combination of rising demand and the closure of outdated, high-cost refineries. The same month, Trafigura joint venture DT Group partnered with Angola’s state oil firm Sonangol to form a new company, Sonaci DT Pte Ltd, to market Angola’s new liquefied natural gas (LNG) exports.

In March 2013, Trafigura announced a deal with South Sudan to export Dar Blend crude oil from Port Sudan. The agreement with South Sudan was a continuation of Trafigura's longtime presence in the Sudanese oil market and followed the resolution of a legal dispute between Sudan and South Sudan over transit fees and oil revenues.

In October 2013 Trafigura secured USD 1.5 billion in financing for an upfront loan to Russian oil producer OAO Rosneft. The prepayment facility, which provided a loan for advance payment for more than 10 million tons of products over five years, was the largest such deal ever completed by Trafigura. A month later Trafigura signed an agreement with Dallas-based pipeline operator Energy Transfer Partners to transport crude oil and condensate via a partially converted 82-mile pipeline from the Eagle Ford oil field in McMullen County, Texas, to Trafigura’s deep-water terminal at Corpus Christi Bay, near the Gulf of Mexico.

In February 2014, Trafigura signed an agreement to acquire a 30% equity stake in the Jinchuan Group's newly established 400,000 tonnes-per-year copper smelter in Fangchengang, China. In July, Trafigura launched Lykos, an online platform in India to sell metals to small and medium-sized manufacturers in the country. In September, Trafigura completed the $860 million sale of an 80% stake in a Corpus Christi Texas oil storage terminal to Buckeye Partners LP.

In June 2015, Trafigura announced a 50:50 joint venture with Abu Dhabi investment company Mubadala Development Company—to invest in base metal mining. As part of the agreement Mubadala also acquired 50% of Trafigura's Minas de Aguas Teñidas (Matsa) mining operation, which owns three mines in southern Spain that produce copper, zinc and lead concentrate ores. This followed a doubling of processing capacity at the company's MATSA mining operation in Andalusia, Spain, where two new satellite mines are also being developed.

In August 2015, it was reported that Trafigura subsidiary Impala Terminals is investing USD1 billion in Colombia to develop a new inland road, rail and river network connecting major coastal ports with Colombia's industrial heartland. The Magdalena River, which runs between Barrancabermeja inland and Barranquilla on the Atlantic coast, will allow transportation of crude oil and petroleum products, dry bulk, containerised and general cargo to and from inland Colombia.

In October 2016, it was announced that Trafigura and Russian investment group United Capital Partners would each take a 24 per cent stake in Essar Oil, which owns India’s second-biggest private refinery in the western state of Gujarat as well as a network of 2,700 filling stations. Trafigura was criticised in December 2022 for handing out "more than $1.7bn (£1.4bn) to its top traders and shareholders after the energy crisis, fuelled by the war in Ukraine".

In 2022, the Lobito Atlantic Railway (LAR), a joint venture between Trafigura, Mota-Engil of Portugal, and independent Belgian rail operator Vecturis, secured a 30-year concession to operate the Lobito rail corridor, which runs across Angola to the Democratic Republic of the Congo (DRC). To mark the transfer of the concession, a ceremony was held on 4 July 2023 in Lobito, with Presidents João Lourenço of Angola, Félix Tshisekedi of the DRC, and Hakainde Hichilema of Zambia in attendance. The concession encompassed the 1,300-kilometre Benguela railway corridor in Angola, extending it 400 kilometres into the DRC, and any potential service extensions in Zambia. The three countries signed an agreement to accelerate growth in domestic and cross-border trade along the corridor. The new company committed to upgrading infrastructure and services, investing US$455,000,000 in Angola and up to US$100,000,000 in the DRC.

The Lobito Corridor project is considered a G7 Partnership for Global Infrastructure and Investment (PGI) flagship investment in Africa. LAR’s mineral terminal at the Port of Lobito launched the venture's port operations in Angola with the docking of the MV Lindsaylou on July 12, 2024, with sulphur on board to be transferred to LAR cargo trains for shipment to the DRC for use in refined copper production in the Katanga region.

On January 11, 2023, the company sold its 24.5% stake in the Indian company Nayara Energy, which was a joint venture with Rosneft. The share was bought by Hara Capital Sarl, a subsidiary of Mareterra Group Holding. In May 2024, it was announced that Trafigura was investing in the company Greenergy.

=== Bond issuances and reported earnings ===
In 2008, the company had equity of more than $2 billion and a turnover of $73 billion that generated $440 million of profit. In March 2010, Trafigura made its first venture into capital markets, issuing Euro 400m ($539m) in five-year Eurobonds. The following month Trafigura listed its first perpetual subordinated bond on the Singapore Exchange (SGX) at a fixed rate of 7.625%. The issuance raised $500m in long-term capital that is treated as equity by international accounting rules, leaving existing shareholders undiluted. By 2011, its revenue had increased to $121.5 billion and its profits to $1.11 billion, with profits falling 11% in 2012. In 2013, as a consequence of the Singapore listing, Trafigura released financial statements for the first time, reporting Q1 profits of $216.1 million – up 3.2 per cent on the previous year. Revenue grew 7.9 per cent to USD 31.2 billion. In March 2016, Trafigura closed a 46 million yen ($413 million) three-year loan, doubling the size of its 2014 Samurai loan.

== Activities ==
In 2024, Trafigura operated in 150 countries and had 50 offices. Trafigura is the third‑largest physical commodities trading group in the world, behind Vitol and Glencore. Trafigura sources, stores, blends, and transports raw materials including oil, refined petroleum products, non‑ferrous metals, iron ore, and coal. It more recently added a third division, focused on gas, power, and renewables.

Trade in non‑ferrous and bulk commodities – mainly copper, lead, and zinc concentrate, alumina, refined metals (copper, lead, zinc, and aluminium), as well as the iron ore and coal trading books – made up 13% of Trafigura's overall trading turnover in 2016. The group traded 8.2 million tonnes of non‑ferrous metal concentrates and 6.6 million tonnes of non‑ferrous refined metal during the year. Overall volume across metals and minerals increased by 13% from 2015 to 59 million tonnes.

Trading volumes in oil and petroleum products totalled 4.3 million barrels per day in 2016, up 42% from 3 million barrels per day in 2015. In October 2016, Trafigura sold five medium‑range tankers to China's Bank of Communications Financial Leasing Co, marking its exit from owning product tankers. In support of its arbitrage‑based business model, Trafigura ensures a degree of control over supply, storage, and logistics through industrial subsidiaries, including the oil storage and distribution business Puma Energy, in which Trafigura holds a 49% interest. Trafigura is involved in paper trading through its subsidiary Galena Asset Management, which was set up in 2003 to invest in commodity funds.

The company was named in the Iraq Oil‑for‑Food scandal in connection with a Liberian‑registered turbine tanker, the Essex, which had UN approval to load Iraqi crude at Iraq's main export terminal at Mina al‑Bakr. The tanker was chartered by Trafigura Beheer BV. According to its captain, Theofanis Chiladakis, the Essex was 'topped off' at least twice, with a total of 272,000 barrels of crude, after UN monitors had signed off on the cargo. This occurred on 13 May and 27 August 2001. Elf Aquitaine employees had first discussed this scheme in February 1998.

In February 2013, Trafigura Maritime Ventures Limited – the Malta‑based subsidiary of Trafigura Maritime Logistics PTE Limited (based in Singapore) – and the oil trading arm of Total became involved in an oil price fixing controversy that led both to be barred from the tendering process at the Enemalta oil purchasing board. Between 1999 and 2012, Enemalta paid the two companies $3.2 billion for oil, accounting for 70% of the oil purchased by Enemalta during that period.

In May 2015, the Financial Times reported that Trafigura had become a major exporter of Rosneft crude oil from Russia despite sanctions. The company experienced a surge in such exports – almost 9 million barrels of crude in April 2015, mostly destined for Asian markets – financed by pre‑pay oil deals in the form of short‑term loans not subject to sanctions. While some commodity traders have been cautious in dealing with sanctioned companies, Trafigura, which works with a number of global banks financing the oil deals, has found a reliable partner in Rosneft for global business.

In 2016, the Swiss non-governmental organisation Public Eye published the results of its investigation showing how traders – especially Trafigura – prepare and sell 'African quality' toxic fuel to Africa, containing high levels of sulphur that cause particulate matter pollution, damaging human health. Subsequently, Ghana reduced the maximum limit of sulphur in imported diesel fuel from 3,000 to 50 parts per million from March 2017 (the European limit is 10 parts per million). Trafigura stated that the report was "misconceived", as it supplies only legal fuel, and that it is up to governments to set fuel specifications.

In November 2018, Global Witness asked the UK's Serious Fraud Office and the US authorities to investigate alleged ties between the Brazilian Operation Car Wash scandal and three oil trading companies, one of which was Trafigura. Trafigura stated that it was keeping the allegations "under review" and affirmed that it was "taking the allegations ... seriously", but denied that its management knew that payments would be used to make improper payments to employees of Petrobras.

Some 18 months later, in May 2020, the Guardian reported that Trafigura was under investigation by the US Commodity Futures Trading Commission (CFTC) for alleged corruption and market manipulation relating to oil trading. Subpoenas demanded information going back at least four years relating to "manipulation and corruption involving oil products and trading". It was unclear whether the CFTC investigation was related to Operation Car Wash. In March 2024, Trafigura agreed to plead guilty and pay a fine of approximately $127 million to resolve charges of bribery of government officials in Brazil by former employees or agents during previous decades, following a series of DOJ probes into oil industry practices.

In April 2023, the Washington Examiner claimed that the American government was enabling the commodity trader to funnel money back to Vladimir Putin's inner circle. In June 2024, Trafigura reached a settlement with the Commodity Futures Trading Commission and paid a $55 million civil fine to settle allegations of fraud, manipulation, and impeding whistleblowers related to the gasoline market in Mexico between 2014 and April 2019. As part of the agreement, Trafigura neither admitted nor denied the CFTC's charges, which dated back to 2014. Two CFTC commissioners took issue with the whistleblower component of the settlement.

In January 2026, Trafigura secured one of the first two special licenses issued by the United States to negotiate sales and export Venezuelan oil. During a White House meeting with President Donald Trump, the company's CEO, Richard Holtum, stated that Trafigura expected to load its first cargo the same week.

== Waste dumping in Ivory Coast ==
The 2006 Ivory Coast toxic waste dump was a health crisis in Ivory Coast in which the Probo Koala, a ship registered in Panama and chartered by Trafigura, hired a local contractor to offload waste in Abidjan after refusing to pay a €1,000 per cubic metre surcharge imposed by Amsterdam Port Services to discourage waste disposal in the Netherlands. The local contractor, Tommy, improperly dumped the waste materials at as many as twelve sites in and around the city of Abidjan in August 2006. The gas released by these chemicals is blamed by the UN and the government of Ivory Coast for the deaths of 17 people and the injury of over 30,000 Ivorians, with injuries ranging from mild headaches to severe burns of the skin and lungs. Almost 100,000 Ivorians sought medical attention after Prime Minister Charles Konan Banny offered free medical care in Abidjan's hospitals to the city's residents.

Trafigura maintains that the substance dumped consisted of 'slops', or waste water from washing the Probo Koala's tanks. An inquiry in the Netherlands in late 2006 confirmed that the substance consisted of more than 500 tonnes of a mixture of fuel, hydrogen sulfide, and sodium hydroxide. After the start of the health crisis in Abidjan, the Probo Koala arrived at the port of Paldiski in Estonia, where Trafigura permitted Dutch police to board the vessel to conduct an investigation.

Trafigura denied that any waste was transported from the Netherlands, stating that the substances contained only tiny amounts of hydrogen sulfide, and that the company did not know the substance was to be disposed of improperly. Trafigura officials, including Claude Dauphin and the company's West Africa regional director, travelled to Abidjan to assist in the cleanup effort but were arrested and imprisoned by the Ivorian government. While its executives were being held, the company agreed to pay US$198 million to the Ivorian government for the cleanup without admitting wrongdoing, and the Ivorian government pledged not to prosecute the company. Dauphin and his fellow executives were released following the settlement.

In 2008, a civil lawsuit in London was launched by almost 30,000 Ivorians against Trafigura. In May 2009, Trafigura announced that it would sue the BBC for libel after its Newsnight programme alleged that the company had knowingly sought to cover up its role in the incident. In September 2009, The Guardian obtained and published internal Trafigura emails showing that the traders responsible knew how dangerous the chemicals were. Shortly afterwards, Trafigura agreed to a settlement of £30 million to settle the suit. In 2010, a Dutch court found Trafigura guilty of illegally exporting toxic waste from Amsterdam. On 16 June 2016, the law firm Leigh Day, which had represented the Ivorian claimants, was found to have breached a contract and its duty of care after £6 million of the 2009 settlement funds were embezzled by a third‑party organisation, which had made a fraudulent claim against the funds.

== Bribery ==
=== Angola ===
In December 2023, Trafigura and its former chief operating officer, Mike Wainwright, were accused by Swiss investigators of arranging €4.3 million in bribes to an Angolan government official representing a subsidiary of Sonagol, Angola's state oil company, between 2009 and 2011. Prosecutors alleged that the funds were related to Trafigura's activities in Angola's petroleum industry, and that the government official favoured Trafigura in shipping contracts, which resulted in $151 million in profits for the company. In January 2025, the Federal Criminal Court of Switzerland convicted Wainwright and Trafigura on bribery charges; Wainwright was sentenced to 32 months' imprisonment, of which 20 months were suspended, and Trafigura was found guilty of not having sufficient systems in place to prevent bribery and was ordered to pay a $3.3 million fine plus $145.6 million in compensation. In late 2025, Trafigura appealed the Swiss court's decision, which under Swiss law is not yet legally binding during the appeals process.

=== Brazil ===
On 28 March 2024, Trafigura pleaded guilty to conspiracy to violate the anti‑bribery provisions of the Foreign Corrupt Practices Act (FCPA) in connection with bribes paid to Brazilian officials. The company agreed to pay approximately $127 million to settle the US Department of Justice investigation. The bribery scheme operated between 2003 and 2014, during which Trafigura paid bribes to Petrobras officials to secure and maintain contracts. The illicit payments amounted to up to 20 cents per barrel of oil products bought from or sold to Petrobras. These bribes were concealed using shell companies and intermediaries with offshore bank accounts.

Trafigura's involvement in this case is connected to Brazil's largest political corruption scandal, known as 'Operation Car Wash' or 'Lava Jato'. This is the first time Trafigura has admitted to being involved in the Car Wash scandal, although its rivals Glencore and Vitol had previously admitted to bribery in relation to the same scandal.

Settlement details

The settlement includes:

- a criminal fine of approximately $80.5 million;
- forfeiture of $46.5 million in proceeds derived from the conspiracy; and
- credit of up to $26.8 million for amounts paid to resolve a related Brazilian investigation.

As part of the agreement, Trafigura is required to submit annual reports on its remediation efforts and the implementation of compliance measures, and to participate in quarterly meetings with the DOJ over a three‑year period.

== Corporate structure ==
Some of Trafigura's major international units include:

- Trafigura Beheer BV, based in the Netherlands.
- Impala Group of Companies, which operates the group's worldwide oil storage and distribution assets and investments, has been a wholly owned subsidiary since 2001.
- Puma Energy, which operates in more than 20 countries, mainly in Central America and Africa, and supplies a network of just over 600 service stations. On 7 May 2012, Puma agreed to buy out the key shareholders in KenolKobil, the largest independent oil marketing company in East and Central Africa, which could have added 400 stations to its network. However, Puma Energy later terminated its bid to acquire the oil marketer.
- EMINCAR, based in Havana until 2010, dedicated to consulting and mineral logistics administration.
- Galena Asset Management, based in Switzerland, is the subsidiary through which Trafigura has established and manages a fund management business. Lord Strathclyde is a non‑executive director on the board.

== See also ==
- Lobito Atlantic Railway, a joint venture including Trafigura

== Literature ==
- Ammann, Daniel (2009). The King of Oil: The Secret Lives of Marc Rich. New York: St. Martin‘s Press. ISBN 978-0-312-57074-3.
