= Pincus Green =

American commodities trader (born 1934)

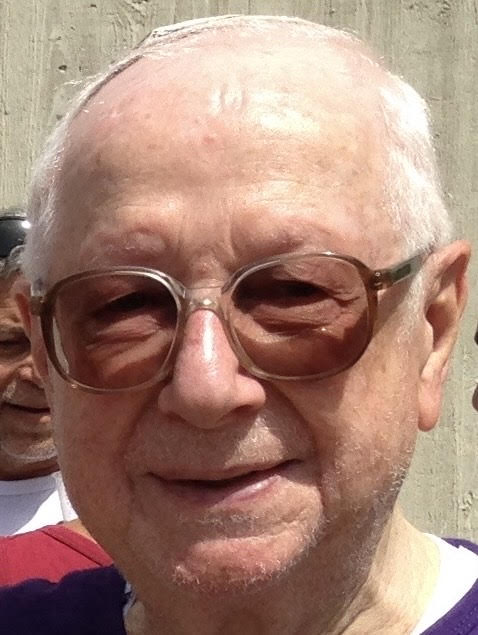
- Born: July 5, 1934 (age 92); Brooklyn, New York, U.S.

Pincus Green (born July 5, 1934) is an American oil and gas commodities trader. In 1983 Green and his business partner Marc Rich were indicted on charges of tax evasion relating to illegal trading with Iran, including deals that were done while the Ayatollahs were holding Americans hostage in Tehran. At the time, it was the largest tax-fraud case in US history. In order to avoid prosecution, Green and Rich fled the United States and moved to Switzerland. However, in 2001 Green and Rich received a controversial presidential pardon from President Bill Clinton, which prompted fierce public criticism as well as a bipartisan Congressional investigation.

== Early life ==
Green was born to an Orthodox Jewish family, the seventh of eight children, and raised in Flatbush, Brooklyn. His father was a distributor of confectionery. As a youth, Green attended Jewish parochial schools but dropped out of high school to support his family when he was 16.

== Career ==
In 1953, at the age of 17, he got a job working the mailroom at the commodity trading firm, Philipp Brothers. In 1954, Philipps hired Marc Rich in the mailroom and they soon became friends. Both quickly advanced in the company and eventually became top traders in Europe especially in oil trading, Rich in Spain and Green in the Philipps' office in Zug. In 1974, they left Philipp Brothers to form their own company, Marc Rich AG, headquartered in Zug, Switzerland.

== Indictment and pardon ==
In September 1983, a federal grand jury in New York returned a 51-count indictment against Marc Rich, Pincus Green, and their companies. A superseding indictment adding an additional 14 counts for a total of 65 was filed in March 1984. It included a variety of serious charges such as evading taxes on more than $100 million in revenues, mail and wire fraud, racketeering and trading with an enemy, Iran, during the Iranian hostage crisis. Green along with his partner Marc Rich, were indicted by U.S. Attorney and future mayor of New York City Rudolph Giuliani. Then they sold the U.S. affiliate of Marc Rich AG (renamed Clarendon Ltd) to Alec Hackel, a partner to Green and Rich. U.S. legal authorities determined that the sale was false and froze the assets of the company, which hurt Marc Rich AG's. In 1984, Clarendon paid the U.S. government $150 million to settle tax charges and Marc Rich AG's trading volume recovered. The three partners divided their responsibilities with Rich trading oil, Hackel trading metals and minerals, and Green responsible for shipping, finance, and administration.

Green received a presidential pardon along with Rich, from United States President Bill Clinton in 2001. The pardon was sharply criticized, with the New York Times calling it "a shocking abuse of presidential power". An investigation by Salon found "an extraordinary tale of international influence peddling and wheeling and dealing" behind the pardon, and Time magazine noted that the pardon of Rich and Green "sparked an investigation into whether it was bought by the hefty donations Rich's ex-wife, Denise, had given to the Clintons and the Democrats." The announcement of the pardon led to an investigation by the US Attorney's Office in New York and the FBI and it also prompted the Congressional House Government Reform Committee to launch a bipartisan investigation, and in May 2002 the committee issued a report which stated:

Marc Rich and Pincus Green have a history of illegal and corrupt business dealings contrary to the security interests of the United States.

Rich and Green have had extensive trade with terrorist states and other enemies of the United States. Despite clear legal restrictions on such trade, Rich and Green have engaged in commodities trading with Iraq, Iran, Cuba, and other rogue states that have sponsored terrorist acts. By engaging in these activities, Marc Rich and Pincus Green demonstrated contempt for American laws, as well as the well- being of Americans who were harmed or threatened by these states....

...Because of the strength of the case against them, Marc Rich and Pincus Green fled the country rather than face trial. Rich's own lawyer told him that by fleeing the country, Rich had "spit on the American flag" and that "whatever you get, you deserve". For the 17 years leading up to his pardon, Marc Rich was one of America's 10 most wanted international fugitives ....

... In order to avoid extradition or apprehension by United States law enforcement, Marc Rich and Pincus Green attempted to renounce their United States citizenship. While this attempt was rejected by the United States, it demonstrated that Rich and Green had no loyalty to the United States and viewed their citizenship as a liability to be discarded at will.

Rich and Green's crimes were so serious that for seventeen years, the U.S. government devoted considerable resources to apprehending them and closing down their business activities. Rich and Green were such high-profile fugitives that on a number of occasions in the 1980s and 1990s, the United States Marshals Service attempted to arrest them in various foreign countries. A number of countries from the United Kingdom to Russia attempted to assist the United States in these efforts.

The pardons of Rich and Green have sent a message that individuals can go from the FBI's most wanted list to a Presidential pardon if they spend money and have the proper connections. This message undermines U.S. efforts to apprehend fugitives abroad.

It has been reported that Green has been in retirement since he underwent heart surgery in late 1990.

In 2005, his net worth was estimated by Forbes magazine at US$1.2 billion.

== See also ==
- List of people pardoned or granted clemency by the president of the United States

== Other reading ==
- Ammann, Daniel (2009). The King of Oil: The Secret Lives of Marc Rich. New York: St. Martin's Press. ISBN 978-0-312-57074-3.
