= Claude Dauphin (businessman) =

French billionaire (1951–2015)

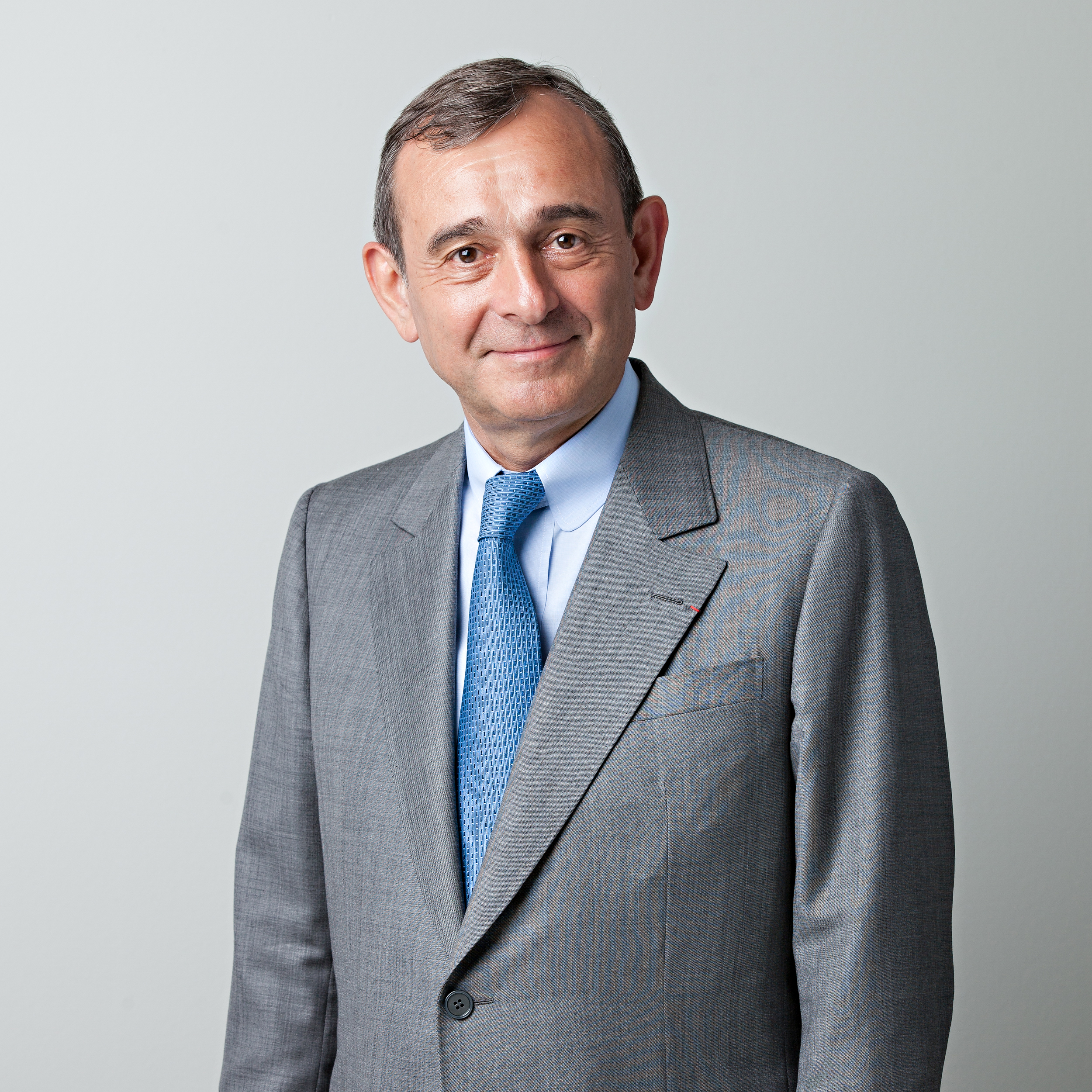
- Dauphin in 2011
- Born: 10 June 1951; Houlgate, France
- Died: 30 September 2015 (aged 64); Bogotá, Colombia
- Occupations: Executive chairman, Trafigura Beheer BV
- Known for: Billionaire commodities trader
- Spouse: Catherine (m. 1976)
- Children: 3

Claude Dauphin (10 June 1951 – 30 September 2015) was a French billionaire businessman and executive chairman of Trafigura Beheer BV, a company specialising in commodity trading (oil, metals, ores). He was a founding partner of Trafigura and its CEO for a time. In March 2013, his net worth was estimated at $1 billion by Forbes.

== Early life ==
Claude Dauphin was born on 10 June 1951 in Houlgate, Normandy in northern France. He went to school at the Ecole St. Laurent in Bayeux, leaving at 16 to work for his father's scrap metal business in Rocquancourt before moving to Paris to join the London Metal Exchange brokerage Brandeis Goldschmidt as a ferro-alloys trader.

== Career ==
In 1977, he met Felix Posen, head of non-ferrous trading at the commodities trading firm Marc Rich + Co. Posen hired him to work at Marc Rich, where Dauphin's first post was in La Paz as country manager for Bolivia.

He moved to New York and subsequently Zug, Switzerland to take up positions as head of zinc and lead trading. In 1988, Dauphin joined the executive committee as head of the petroleum trading division in London.

In 1992, as a result of the controversy surrounding Marc Rich and his indictments in the United States, Dauphin left the company following his father's death. He took over management of the family firm, which he renamed and grew to become international waste management company Ecore. He remained closely involved with the family business for the remainder of his life.

In early 1993, Dauphin formed a partnership with five senior Marc Rich employees who had left the company, which was bought out by senior managers and renamed Glencore.

In March of that year, he acquired an existing shell business based in the Netherlands, Trafigura Beheer B.V., to form a rival commodities trading firm. In its first year of business Trafigura set up a profitable oil trading book and won oil contracts in Argentina. The company also profited as a supplier of raw materials to China, growing to become the third largest global oil trader.

In 2000 Trafigura acquired Puma Energy, a Latin American mid- and downstream company which subsequently expanded and by 2014 operated from 45 countries and had revenues of $13.4 billion. By that time, Trafigura had brought in Sonangol as a 30% shareholder in Puma, and had also reduced its own stake to 49%.

Dauphin never took Trafigura public, believing private company status was the best model for a trading firm.

Trafigura's revenue rose tenfold in the period from 2005 to 2014 to reach $127 billion.

In his leadership position with the company, Dauphin was involved in Trafigura's response to the 2006 Ivory Coast toxic waste dump environmental disaster. After local contracting company Tommy dumped 500 tonnes of waste at landfill sites around the port of Abidjan, Dauphin led a Trafigura delegation to Ivory Coast. He and four others were arrested and imprisoned in the city's Maca Prison for five months on charges of dumping toxic waste. Trafigura denied responsibility and culpability for the dumping incident but, with the executives still in custody, agreed to pay $198 million in order to secure the release of its employees on February 12, 2007. Three days later, Dauphin and Valentini were released and the Ivorian government dropped its charges against them.

Diagnosed with cancer in 2014, Dauphin worked to a hectic schedule to the end of his life. During his illness, he named former risk manager Jeremy Weir as Trafigura's new chief executive officer and continued to travel. In the weeks prior to his death, Dauphin traveled to Nigeria to secure an oil swaps contract with the government of Muhammadu Buhari and to Angola to maintain Trafigura's status as the country's refined products supplier.

== Personal life ==
Dauphin married his wife Catherine in July 1976 in Caen, France. The couple had three children: Aurélie, Guillaume, and Charlotte.

Dauphin died in hospital in Bogotá, Colombia, on 30 September 2015, during a business trip. In addition to his wife and three children, he was also survived by his five young grandchildren Maya, Alexander, Farah, Sebastian and Victoria and other members of his family.

Dauphin was known to be a tough, disciplined boss, who continued to recycle metals after his father's death. A private man, Dauphin was also known to communicate with lenders and bondholders in the company's annual report, but not to speak publicly. The only public speech he gave throughout his life was after receiving the Chevalier de la Légion d’Honneur from French President Jacques Chirac in 2001.

Dauphin was active in the philanthropic work of the Trafigura Foundation.
