= Gary Nagle =

South African business executive

- Born: 1974 or 1975 (age 50–51)
- Education: University of the Witwatersrand
- Title: CEO of Glencore
- Term: July 2021-
- Predecessor: Ivan Glasenberg

Gary Nagle (born 1975) is a South African business executive, and the CEO of Glencore.

Nagle earned degrees in commerce and accounting from the University of the Witwatersrand, South Africa. He qualified as a chartered accountant in South Africa in 1999.

Nagle joined Glencore in 2000, rising to head up its coal assets, and succeeded Ivan Glasenberg as CEO on July 1, 2021. He planned to relocate from Australia to Switzerland in 2021.

In 2023, Nagle, in his first major business decision as CEO, proposed a $23 billion takeover of Teck Resources, and plans to form two new companies after the acquisition, with one focusing on the metals industry and the other producing coal.
