= Glencore =

Multinational commodity trading and mining company

Glencore plc
- Type: Public
- Traded as: LSE: GLEN; JSE: GLN; ASX: GLC; FTSE 100 Component
- Industry: Mining; Metals; Commodity trading; Natural resources
- Founded: 1974; 52 years ago (as Marc Rich + Co AG)
- Founder: Marc Rich
- Headquarters: Baar, Switzerland (headquarters); London, United Kingdom (head office – oil & gas); Saint Helier, Jersey (registered office)
- Area served: Worldwide
- Key people: Kalidas Madhavpeddi (Chairperson); Gary Nagle (CEO)
- Products: Metals and minerals (copper, cobalt, zinc, nickel, lead, ferroalloys, aluminium, iron ore, gold, silver); Energy products (thermal & steelmaking coal, crude oil, petroleum products, natural gas)
- Services: Commodity trading & marketing; Logistics & freight; Commodity financing; Recycling
- Revenue: ▲US$247.535 billion (2025)
- Operating income: ▼US$5.978 billion (2025)
- Net income: ▲US$363 million (2025)
- Total assets: ▲US$142.199 billion (2025)
- Total equity: ▼US$33.606 billion (2025)
- Owner: Ivan Glasenberg (9.52%); Qatar Holding LLC (8.22%); Aristotelis Mistakidis (3.10%)
- Number of employees: ~150,000 (employees and contractors, 2025)
- Website: www.glencore.com

Glencore plc is an Anglo-Swiss multinational commodity trading and mining company with headquarters in Baar, Switzerland. Glencore's oil and gas headquarters are in London, England, as well as its primary listing being on the London Stock Exchange, and it is one of the largest components of the FTSE 100 by market capitalization.

The company's registered office is in Saint Helier, Jersey, a Crown Dependency of the United Kingdom. By some estimates, it is the world's largest commodity trader, and among the world's largest companies.

The company was formed in 1994 by a management buyout of Marc Rich + Co AG (itself founded in 1974). The company merged with Xstrata in 2013, increasing its size substantially. Before that, the company was already one of the world's largest integrated producers and marketers of commodities.

Glencore was the largest company in Switzerland as well as the world's largest commodities trading company, with a 2010 global market share of 60% in internationally tradable zinc, 50% in internationally tradable copper, 9% in the internationally tradable grain market and 3% in the internationally tradable oil market.

Glencore has a number of production facilities all around the world and supplied metals, minerals, crude oil, oil products, coal, natural gas and agricultural products to international customers in the automotive, power generation, steel production and food processing industries. It was listed on the London Stock Exchange in May 2011 and was a constituent of the FTSE 100 Index.

It had a secondary listing on the Hong Kong Stock Exchange, but withdraw it in January 2018. Glencore's shares started trading on the Johannesburg Stock Exchange in November 2013. The Qatar Investment Authority was its biggest shareholder as of 2016. In March 2022, Qatar's Sovereign Wealth Fund announced it would sell a stake worth £812 million (US$1.1 billion) in Glencore Plc.

Glencore was listed on the Australian Securities Exchange on 14 October 2026, trading as GLC.

== History ==
=== 1974–1994: formation and sale ===
The company was founded in 1974 as Marc Rich & Co. AG by commodity traders Marc Rich and Pincus Green. In 1993, some Marc Rich employees, led by Claude Dauphin, left to set up another trading company, Trafigura. In 1994, after failing to take control of the zinc market and losing $172 million, Rich was forced to sell his majority share in the company to Glencore International, the commodities trading and industrial company. Glencore's name is an abbreviation of "Global Energy Commodity Resources".

=== 2005: dealings with "rogue states" ===
The Australian Broadcasting Corporation's Radio National reported in 2005 that Glencore "has been accused of illegal dealings with rogue states: apartheid South Africa, USSR, Iran, and Iraq under Saddam Hussein", and has a "history of busting UN embargoes to profit from corrupt or despotic regimes". Specifically, the CIA alleged Glencore had paid $3,222,780 in illegal kickbacks to obtain oil in the course of the UN oil-for-food programme for Iraq. The company denied these charges, according to the CIA report quoted by ABC.

=== 2005–2011: Glencore, Dan Gertler, and the Congo ===
In 2005, proceeds from an oil sale to Glencore were seized as fraudulent gains as part of an investigation into corruption in the Democratic Republic of Congo. In 2007, Katanga Mining (later acquired by Glencore) announced that its acquisition of a rival mining company, Nikanor plc, in a transaction valued at US$3.3 billion.

In May 2011, the company launched an IPO which valued the business at US$61 billion and created five new billionaires. Trading was limited to institutional investors for the first week and private investors were not allowed to buy shares until 24 May 2011.

=== 2011: financial and accounting manipulations ===
In 2011, five non-government organisations filed a complaint to the OECD against a subsidiary of Glencore over allegations that a mine it owns in Zambia may not be paying enough tax on its profits. This complaint was due to alleged financial and accounting manipulations that had been supposedly performed by the two companies' subsidiary, Mopani Copper Mines Plc (MCM), to evade taxation in Zambia.

A draft Grant Thornton report alleged that tax avoidance by Glencore in Zambia cost the Zambian Government hundreds of millions of dollars in lost revenue. The avoidance was allegedly facilitated through transfer pricing and inflated costs at Glencore's Mopani Copper Mine, which is controlled through the British Virgin Islands, a recognised tax haven. Glencore and its own auditor, Deloitte, rejected these allegations. As of 2013, Glencore's payments to Zambia's government had increased.

Due to weak global prices for the assets Glencore owned, particularly coal and copper producers, and for the commodities in which Glencore traded, the company showed a net operating loss of $676 million for the first half of 2015, and the company's stocks fell, as a result. Concerns cited by financial analysts to explain the falling stock price included a weak global commodity market and Glencore's high level of debt $30 billion. The company reduced its debt by selling off stock and assets.

=== 2011: Associations with other mining companies ===
Glencore is also a large shareholder in globalCOAL, the online physical coal trading platform.

Glencore owns 44% of Century Aluminum Co., 70.5% of Minara Resources, and 8.8% of United Company Rusal.

=== 2011–2012: initial public offering ===
Glencore was the subject of an initial public offering (IPO) in May 2011 in a dual listing in London and Hong Kong valued at about $US60 billion. The 1,637-page document revealed invaluable information about this private company that had remained discreet for thirty-seven years. Ivan Glasenberg's shareholding was diluted from 18.1% before the IPO percent to 15.8% afterwards. Daniel Mate and Telis Mistakidis, zinc, copper, and lead co-directors were diluted from 6.9% to 6%. Glencore went public to raise gross proceeds of around $10 billion. According to Reuters, Glencore is known for its "opportunistic but lucrative acquisition strategy."

In May 2011, United Arab Emirates state-owned Aabar Investments confirmed an investment of $850 million in Glencore International plc as a cornerstone investor with an intention to invest an additional $150 million in the Global Offer. The investment made Aabar the largest cornerstone investor in the initial public offering (IPO) and the largest new shareholder of Glencore after its IPO, giving Aabar a 1.4% stake. The two firms intend to explore areas of co-operation.

In November 2012, Abu Dhabi's Aabar Investments, a unit of Abu Dhabi's state-owned United Arab Emirates International Petroleum Investment Company, wrote off more than $392-million of its $1-billion investment into Glencore's IPO less than two years after investing it. Aabar Investments was the largest new shareholder in Glencore.

=== 2012–2013: merger with Xstrata ===
Prior to its merger with Xstrata, Glencore is reported to have served as a marketing partner for the company. As of 2006, Glencore leaders Willy Strothotte and Ivan Glasenberg were on the board of Xstrata, which Strothotte chaired. According to The Sunday Times, by 2006, Glencore controlled 40% of Xstrata stock and appointed Xstrata CEO, Mick Davis.

In February 2012, Glencore International Plc, agreed to buy Xstrata Plc for £39.1 billion (US$62 billion) in shares. Glencore offered 2.8 new shares for each Xstrata share in agreed all-share "merger of equal". It is the biggest mining takeover ever, and after approval would create an entity with 2012 sales of US$209 billion. In June 2012, Glencore and Xstrata began to reconsider the proposed retention package for their merger, following shareholder opposition to a huge payout for executives. In total, 73 key executives stood to receive over GBP 170 million under the initial retention package.

In October 2012, BBC News reported that Glencore had more ships than the British Royal Navy. Glencore's operations in 40 countries handled 3% of the world's oil consumption. Xstrata's operations in more than 20 countries employed 70,000 people. According to mining analyst John Meyer, if the two companies merged into Glencore Xstrata, they would be the 4th largest commodities trader in the world.

Just before completing its forced April 2013 takeover of mining rival Xstrata as it awaited Chinese regulatory approval for its long-planned merger, the world's largest diversified commodities trader, the annual income of Glencore fell 25% percent, as its trading division offset the impact of weak commodity prices. Including the impact of an impairment related to a reclassification of its holding in Russian aluminium producer RUSAL, net income fell 75%.

On 2 May 2013, it completed the merger with Xstrata. On 20 May 2014, Glencore Xstrata changed its name to Glencore plc. After the merger with Glencore, Xstrata CFO Trevor Reid announced that he would no longer work as employee but would become a consultant. After 11 years of involvement, this marked a massive shift in the company's strategy and Xstrata was entering a post-Reid era.

=== 2013–2020: further investment ===
"In Ecuador, the current government has tried to reduce the role played by middlemen such as Glencore with state oil company Petroecuador" due to questions about transparency and follow-through, according to Fernando Villavicencio, a Quito-based oil sector analyst, writing in 2011.

In May 2014 the company announced it would close its underground Newlands coal mine in Queensland, Australia in late 2015. The mine, begun in 1983, produced 2.8 million tonnes of thermal coal in 2013. The company had earlier suspended operations at its Ravensworth underground mine following falling coal prices, escalating production costs, and a higher Australian dollar.

In 2017, Glencore bought Chevron's Southern African assets for R1 billion. Glencore then began rebranding Caltex gas stations in South Africa and Botswana to Astron Energy - a then-new petroleum company based in Cape Town. Glencore also commenced with major infrastructure upgrades at the Astron Refinery (formerly the Caltex Refinery) in Milnerton, Cape Town, bringing production capacity for Western Cape use and African export markets up to 100,000 barrels per day.

In June 2018 Glencore purchased a 78% stake in Ale Combustíveis S.A., a Brazilian fuel distribution company. Through Ale Glencore aimed to expand its fuel distribution network by forging agreements with unbranded gas stations.

In February 2019, Glencore announced it would reduce production at one of its biggest copper and cobalt mines operations in Congo. The country's Mutanda mine produced 199,000 tons of copper and 27,000 tons of cobalt in 2018, accounting for roughly one-fifth of global cobalt production. The production curbs are likely temporary, as the company is exploring new mining techniques for the site.

GlencoreXstrata operates a gold mine in Nunavut, and nickel mines in Nunavik in Canada. In October 2020, Glencore provided $10 million in bridge financing to Falco Resources, a gold and copper miner operating in Quebec.

=== 2020–present ===
In October 2020, Glencore CEO Ivan Glasenberg argued that there was no environmental benefit in divesting from coal assets since the spun-off coal mines would likely be taken over by other players without any regard for the Paris climate goals. He instead argued for capping coal mine production, thereby running them down, and using the thus generated cash to increase the production of other raw materials in high demand due to the global energy transformation, such as nickel, copper and cobalt. Two months later, in December 2020, Glasenberg announced that he will be retiring in 2021 thus stepping out of the CEO position after nearly 20 years. He will be succeeded by South African Gary Nagle, who is currently running the firm's coal business.

In February 2022, Glencore acquired Newmont's 18.75% interest in the MARA project in Argentina, which increased Glencore's interest to 43.75%. Glencore will pay $124.9 million at closing and $30 million in installments upon commercial production at an annual interest rate of 6% (not to exceed $50 million). MARA is a joint venture between Yamana Gold, Glencore and Newmont in the Catamarca province of Argentina. Proven and probable mineral reserves - 5.4 million tons of copper and 7.4 million ounces of gold.

In 2023, Glencore acquired a 56.25% interest in the MARA project from Pan American Silver. The company paid $475 million plus a royalty of 0.75% of the net smelter return (NSR). Once commissioned, MARA will be one of the world's top 25 copper producers, with a capacity of 200,000 tonnes per annum for the first 10 years.

In August 2022, the market predicted that Glencore would deliver a record profit due to its ability to thrive in volatile markets, and particularly because of its coal business that was growing rapidly during the 2022 global energy crisis. The use of coal, even in Europe, is increasing by double digit percentages as it replaces expensive natural gas from Russia. While traditional mining companies such as BHP and Rio Tinto have experienced a slowdown due to a lower demand for iron and copper ores by China, Glencore was able to increase its business mostly with coal, despite the dirty image this form of energy has. Business analysts forecasted that Glencore's dividends could exceed $10 billion in total in 2022.

In September 2022, Glencore said it planned to reach net-zero carbon emissions by 2050 aiming at a 40% reduction in carbon footprint by 2035 compared to its 2019 levels, making them on track with the Paris agreement on climate change.

In November 2023, Glencore acquired the steelmaking coal business of Teck Resources for $9 billion. At the same time, Glencore announced its intention to spin off its coal assets by 2025 into a separate entity that would be listed on the New York Stock Exchange with secondary listings on the Toronto and Johannesburg exchanges. The acquisition of Teck Resources' steelmaking coal business completed in July 2024, and Glencore announced the following month that the planned spin off of its coal assets had been abandoned.

In August 2024, Glencore announced its decision to retain its coal business, reversing previous plans for a spin-off. This decision came after extensive consultation with shareholders, with over 95% of those expressing a preference supporting the retention of the coal and carbon steel materials business. The company cited the potential for enhanced cash generation and the ability to fund opportunities in transition metals as key reasons for this strategy.

The acquisition of Elk Valley Resources (EVR) in July 2024 significantly expanded Glencore's coal operations. This addition is expected to increase the company's potential saleable coal by over 30% through to the end of mine life, with EVR's metallurgical coal mines having an average life of 31 years, extending beyond 2050. Despite retaining its coal assets, Glencore maintains its commitment to achieving climate neutrality by 2050. However, the company's climate plan now requires updating to account for the increased coal exposure resulting from the EVR acquisition.

In March 2025, Glencore acquired a 20% interest in CAPGC Pte. Ltd. for approximately US$147 million. CAPGC subsequently acquired Aster Chemicals and Energy, which operates the former Shell refining and petrochemicals complex in Singapore, expanding Glencore's interests in the Asian downstream energy sector.

In July 2025, Glencore completed the merger of its agricultural trading subsidiary Viterra with Bunge Global SA. In exchange for its approximately 50% interest in Viterra, Glencore received 32.8 million Bunge shares, representing a 16.4% stake in the enlarged company, and approximately US$940 million in cash. The transaction ended Glencore's direct ownership of Viterra while retaining an indirect interest in agricultural commodities through its Bunge shareholding.

In December 2025, it was announced that Glencore had acquired a majority stake in FincoEnergies, a Netherlands-based fuel supplier, for an undisclosed amount. The acquisition expanded Glencore's interests in downstream fuel distribution in north-west Europe.

== Controversies ==
=== Colombia ===
In 2006, Swiss public television (TSR) reported that allegations of corruption and severe human rights violations were being raised against Glencore due to the alleged conduct of its Colombian Cerrejón mining subsidiary. Local union president Francisco Ramirez accused Cerrejón of forced expropriations and evacuations of entire villages to enable mine expansion, in complicity with Colombian authorities. A representative of the local Wayuu community also accused Colombian paramilitary and military units, including those charged with Cerrejón mining security, of forcibly driving Wayuu people off their land in what she described as a "massacre".

In 2012, a BBC investigation uncovered sale documents showing the company had paid the associates of paramilitary killers in Colombia. In 2011, a Colombian court was told by former paramilitaries that they stole the land so they could sell it to Glencore's subsidiary Prodeco, to start an open-cast coal mine; the court accepted their evidence and concluded that coal was the motive for the massacre. Glencore disputed the court's ruling.

In 2009, Glencore/Xstrata's "huge coal operation in Colombia, Prodeco, was fined a total of nearly $700,000 for several environmental violations [running in earlier years], including waste disposal without a permit and producing coal without an environmental management plan".

Glencore/Xstrata's activities in Colombia under their subsidiary, Prodeco, was investigated by the Netherlands-based NGO, Pax for Peace. They found that "From 1996 to 2006, residents of the Cesar mining region of Colombia, from which European power utilities source most of their coal, have suffered greatly from paramilitary violence ... Prodeco mining companies have supported the paramilitary forces with finance, equipment, and information. The mining companies deny any involvement, but those victims of human rights violations who stand up for their rights, are still being threatened." The coal mined by Prodeco is termed "Blood Coal". Pax released a report and included the testimony of victims and the paramilitary that attacked the indigenous population.

=== Democratic Republic of the Congo ===
The company's Luilu copper refinery uses acid to extract the copper. For three years after taking over the mine, it continued to allow the waste acid to flow into a river. The chief executive, Ivan Glasenberg, was interviewed for Panorama by John Sweeney and said 'It was impossible to remedy any way faster' Glencore said the pollution started long before the company took over the refinery and that it has now ended.

A reporter for The Guardian found children as young as ten years underground at the Tilwezembe mine, which the company had said in a 2008 prospectus that it had closed due to falling copper prices. Prices rebounded later. CEO Glasenberg said the company does not profit from child labor, and the child miners went with artisanal mining by nearby residents that Glencore was trying to prevent. But Panorama tracked a shipment of copper from the mine to Groupe Bazano plant and from that plant to a Glencore smelter in Zambia.

Glencore was also accused of acquiring illicit "conflict minerals" In a detailed letter sent to Global Witness, the company denied any wrongdoing.

Glencore acquired stakes in the Kansuki mine in Congo's southern Katanga Province in 2012. According to Global Witness, Congo's government transferred a 75% stake in Kansuki mine in secret and at vastly undervalued prices in July 2010 to a company in which Dan Gertler, who is a close friend of President Joseph Kabila, has an interest. Just a month later, in August 2010, Glencore took half the shares of the company that acquired that 75% stake, becoming the operator of the mine. Glencore is financing the entire development of the Kansuki mine, thereby carrying the costs for the other partner companies, which are associated with Mr. Gertler. Glencore said at the time "During the period when these transactions took place, Glencore had decided in general not to increase its shareholdings in DRC projects."

Glencore acquired a 50% share in SAMREF Congo SPRL in 2007, a Congolese-registered company holding 80% of the Mutanda Mine. According to Global Witness, SAMREF recommended on 1 March 2011 that Congo's state-run company Gécamines, holding the other 20% of the Mutanda Mine, sell this share to an entity also associated with Dan Gertler and went on to question the links between Glencore and Dan Gertler. Glencore has been designated operator of the Mutanda Mine. Glencore has responded a number of times to Global Witness regarding these allegations.

In March 2018, it was reported that Glencore would sell one third (13,800 tonnes) of its cobalt output to China's battery recycler GEM. 18,000 tonnes are to be sold in 2019, and 21,000 in 2020. In December 2020, the company extended the agreement with GEM to at least 2029. During the FT Commodities Global Summit in Lausanne, Switzerland, CEO Glasenberg stated "if cobalt falls into the hands of the Chinese, yeah you won't see EVs being produced in Europe etc." Yet, Glasenberg then said that he was prepared to sell DRC cobalt mines to China if the price was good. Concurrently, a Chinese take-over of some of the mines became a real possibility due to a legal dispute about royalty payments to Gertler and Gécamines.

The DRC supplies 60% of the world's cobalt ore, while China produces more than 80% of the world's refined cobalt. In December 2018, Bloomberg reported that the Chinese battery firm GEM withdrew from its purchase contract with the commodities trader due to a price crash and oversupply of cobalt ore and recycled sources. In November 2018, export stopped due to oversupply and uranium contamination at the Kamoto Project; the company planned to fix this with a US$25 million ion-exchange refining plant.

In a June 2018 "debt-for-equity swap", Glencore's Katanga Mining agreed to a recapitalization plan involving a US$5.6 billion debt write-off and a $150 million payment to the Congolese state mining company Gécamines. According to company sources, Gertler will receive a royalty of about 25 million euros in 2018.

Later in June 2018, Glencore also announced that it had resumed paying royalties to Gertler's Ventora Development in unpaid and future royalties from the subsidiaries Mutanda Mining ($695 million) and Kamoto Copper Co ($2.28 billion). Gertler had sued Glencore in a Congolese court after payments stopped when he was sanctioned by the U.S. government in December 2017. The mines produce copper and cobalt, needed for lithium-ion batteries in mobile devices and electric vehicles. Glencore and Gertler were in a legal dispute, threatening the strategic supply of the metals and ownership of the mining entities. Glencore paid the royalties in a currency other than dollars to skirt sanctions and discussed the deal with Swiss and U.S. authorities. Glencore also settled a dispute involving the Kamoto copper and cobalt mine, but differences remain about tax and royalty payment.

In July 2018, the DRC enforced a new mining code, which forced Glencore to pay higher taxes. In response, the company began talks with the Congolese government. In August, CEO Glasberg announced that Glencore was considering legal action.

On 22 June 2021, the company reported the Mutanda mine would be reopened towards the end of 2021 and return to production in 2022. Earlier, Glencore officials discussed the re-opening of the mine with Congo's mining ministry in Kinshasa. Cobalt prospects for the company increased significantly since the inception of a long-term battery supply contract with Tesla Motors in mid-2020.

From 2007 to 2018, Glencore paid $27.5 million to third parties to bribe government officials in Congo. In December 2022, the company agreed to pay $180 million to Congo to settle the case.

=== Morocco ===
In 2013 and 2014, a subsidiary of Glencore Xstrata was awarded two offshore drilling licences off the coast of Western Sahara.

=== Zambia ===
According to a Reuters article in 2011 "[O]fficials in Zambia believe pollution from Glencore's Mopani mine is causing acid rain and health problems in an area where 5 million people live." The upgrade of the Mopani Mines asset plant was completed in March 2014 eliminating the emissions of 97 per cent of sulphur dioxide emissions in line with the recommended international standards by the World Health Organisation (WHO). The emissions were reported to exceed the WHO-recommendations by a factor of 70 up to 2013. The emissions now exceed the recommendations by 3% of 70 = 210%. (Note: The article cited states that (i) 3% (100%–97%) of the sulfur-dioxid still passes through the filters and (ii) that the total amount before the filter is 7000% of the WHO-recommendation. As 3% x 7000% is 210%, the emissions are over twice the recommendation.)

In January 2019, a delegation from the Federal Department of Foreign Affairs under the leadership of Ignazio Cassis made a controversial visit to the Mopani Copper Mines that also produce cobalt ores. The Swiss government had previously issued human rights guidelines for firms operating in the commodity sector, which is of strategic importance to both countries. The visit was heavily criticised by Amnesty International and Swiss watchdog groups while the federal councilor defended his stance, pointing out the modernisation of production facilities, improved health care and better training for young workers.

=== Paradise Papers ===
On 5 November 2017, the Paradise Papers, a set of confidential electronic documents leaked from Bermuda-based legal services provider Appleby relating to offshore investment, revealed that Glencore loaned $45 million to Israeli billionaire Dan Gertler in exchange for his help with officials of the Democratic Republic of Congo in negotiations over a joint venture with state-owned Gécamines at the Katanga copper mine, in which one of the board members was Glencore major shareholder Telis Mistakidis. Glencore, which had effectively taken over Katanga, agreed to vote for the joint venture. The loan document specifically provided that repayment would be owed if agreement was not reached within three months. Gertler and Glencore have denied wrongdoing. Appleby had worked for Glencore and its founder Marc Rich on major projects in the past, even after his indictment in 1983. Rich was indicted in the United States on federal charges of tax evasion and making controversial oil deals with Iran during the Iran hostage crisis. He received a controversial presidential pardon from U.S. President Bill Clinton on 20 January 2001, Clinton's last day in office.

In 2024, it was reported that the Chilean tax authorities were initiating the process of recouping more than $1.5 billion in unpaid taxes from Glencore.

The Australian branch of Glencore has been demonstrated to have carried out some $25 billion in cross-currency interest rate swaps, complex financial instruments the Australian Taxation Office suspects of being used to avoid paying taxes in Australia. Glencore is also a co-owner of large coal freighters fleet Swiss-Marine.

=== Reactions to U.S. sanctions ===
In April 2018, the company started to limit its exposure to Oleg Deripaska by canceling the plan to swap an 8.75 percent stake in aluminum producer United Co. Rusal for shares in another one of Deripaska's companies, London-listed En+ Group Plc. The commodities trader also announced that Chief Executive Officer Ivan Glasenberg had resigned from Rusal's board. In March 2022, the company leadership strongly condemned the 2022 Russian invasion of Ukraine; it would "review business activities in the country including our equity stakes in En+ and Rosneft." Glencore owns a 10.55% stake in En+ Group International PJSC, the controlling shareholder of aluminum giant United Co. Rusal International, and less than 1% in Rosneft. The company also stated it had "no operational footprint in Russia". British news outlets, however, noted that Swiss-based Glencore, among other commodity companies, loaded cargoes of oil products onto tankers at Russian ports in mid-March 2022. While some oil companies such as BP Plc and Shell Plc were pressured to halt Russian oil purchases, Glencore remained in the lucrative business for trading Russian crude.

=== Investigation by U.S. Department of Justice ===
On 3 July 2018, the company announced that it received a subpoena from the U.S. Department of Justice "to produce documents and other records with respect to compliance with the Foreign Corrupt Practices Act and the United States money laundering statutes". The requested documents relate to the Glencore Group's business in Nigeria, the Democratic Republic of Congo, and Venezuela from 2007 to present. In May 2018, Bloomberg reported that Britain's Serious Fraud Office may also open a bribery investigation into Glencore's dealing with Dan Gertler and DRC President Joseph Kabila.

On 24 May 2022, Glencore pleaded guilty to multiple counts of bribery and agreed to pay penalties of about $1.5 billion.

=== International Rights Advocates v. Apple, Microsoft, Dell, Tesla ===
The International Rights Advocates groups filed a lawsuit, International Rights Advocates v. Apple, Microsoft, Dell, Tesla, on 15 December 2019 against Apple, Microsoft, Dell, and Tesla that names Glencore. The lawsuit claims that the named companies benefited from and aided and abetted child labor in mining companies' cobalt operations. It is argued that Glencore-owned mines sold cobalt to Umicore, which then sold the cobalt to be used in lithium batteries in Apple, Microsoft, Dell, and Tesla products. Glencore released a statement through a spokesperson noting the allegations and stating that "[Glencore] does not tolerate any form of child, forced, or compulsory labour."

The case was dismissed, and International Rights Advocates appealed in 2022.

=== U.S. Commodities Futures Trading Commission investigation ===
In April 2019 the U.S. Commodity Futures Trading Commission notified the company of an investigation into whether the company violated parts of the Commodity Exchange Act, or regulations concerning corrupt practices related to commodities. In May 2022, Glencore pled guilty to charges of corrupt dealings with foreign governments, and agreed to pay a $1.8 billion fine. The corrupt practices occurred from 2007 to 2018, and included actions to "make and conceal corrupt payments and bribes through intermediaries for the benefit of foreign officials across multiple countries".

In August 2020, Glencore suspended its dividend payments to investors, saying it will instead prioritise paying down its debt in the immediate term. It was the first major mining company to shelve its dividend owing to the business impacts of the COVID-19 pandemic.

=== Long-term supply contract with Tesla ===
In June 2020, it was reported that Tesla Motors partnered with Glencore for the future supply of cobalt in their lithium-ion batteries. Just a year earlier, BMW did the same with Glencore and the Bou Azzer mine in Morocco. Initially Tesla wanted to eliminate the controversial metal from its battery formula, but then the company decided for its continued use, boosting cobalt prospects significantly, according to industry experts.

=== UK SFO charges and continued investigations ===
In 2022, Glencore's UK subsidiary twice pleaded guilty to corruption charges levelled by the Serious Fraud Office (SFO). These charges accused Glencore of paying over US$53 million of bribes between 2011 and 2016 to officials in Africa to "secure access to oil and make illicit profit".

On May 24, Glencore Energy UK Limited indicated in court that it would plead guilty to five counts of bribery and two counts of failure to prevent bribery under the UK Bribery Act 2010. The SFO found that over US$25 million in bribes were paid in Cameroon, Equatorial Guinea, Ivory Coast, Nigeria, and South Sudan between 2011 and 2016 for preferential access to oil, and accused Glencore of "profit-driven bribery and corruption".

Glencore executives acknowledged the "unacceptable practices" and "misconduct identified in these investigations", but argued that the company had been making efforts to improve its ethics and compliance program since before it knew of the US DOJ investigation. The company predicted that fines for the seven corruption charges would not exceed the US$1.5 billion it set aside in 2021 for resolving the investigations undertaken by various national authorities.

On June 21, a British subsidiary of Glencore again pleaded guilty to seven counts of bribery. These charges pertained to oil operations in Nigeria, Cameroon, Equatorial Guinea, Ivory Coast and South Sudan between 2012 and 2016. The SFO found that over US$28 million in bribes were paid for officials to "perform their functions improperly". Glencore again predicted that fines would not exceed the US$1.5 billion it had previously set aside.

Glencore faces continued investigations from the Office of the Attorney General of Switzerland and the Dutch Public Prosecution Service. It is possible that these continued investigations may be linked to Vitol, a Swiss-based Dutch commodity trading company and Glencore's largest competitor that is often claimed to be equal or greater in size to Glencore and has been linked to similar legal challenges in resource-rich countries.

=== Human rights abuse accusations ===
Since 2010 there were over 70 human rights abuse accusations against Glencore documented by Business & Human Rights Resource Centre.

=== Lobbying ===
On 6 March 2019, The Guardian Australia accused Glencore, aided by consulting firm CT Group, of engaging in a large-scale, globally coordinated lobbying campaign to promote coal use "by undermining environmental activists, influencing politicians and spreading sophisticated pro-coal messaging on social media." The campaign was started in 2017 and ran until 2019, when it was shut down in February, according to Glencore.

=== Australian water supply damage ===
In November 2023, Glencore controversially announced a plan to inject up to 110,000 tonnes of carbon dioxide per year into the Australian groundwater basic. Hydrogeologist Ned Hamer stated that the carbon dioxide would increase the acidity of the water to the extent that it would dissolve the rock, releasing heavy metals into the water and making it unusable as a water source for farmers and people living in the Australian outback.

== Business trend ==
| | 2016 | 2017 | 2018 | 2019 | 2020 | 2021 | 2022 | 2023 | 2024 | 2025 |
|---|---|---|---|---|---|---|---|---|---|---|
| Total revenue (USD bn) | 153 | 205 | 220 | 215 | 142 | 204 | 256 | 218 | 231 | 248 |
| Operating income (USD bn) | 2.1 | 6.0 | 6.6 | 2.5 | −1.8 | 9.8 | 23.8 | 8.7 | 3.3 | 3.3 |
| Net income (USD bn) | 1.4 | 5.8 | 3.4 | −0.4 | −1.9 | 5.0 | 17.3 | 4.3 | −1.6 | 0.4 |
| Total assets (USD bn) | 125 | 136 | 129 | 124 | 118 | 128 | 133 | 124 | 130 | 142 |
| Total equity (USD bn) | 43.8 | 49.6 | 45.4 | 39.2 | 34.4 | 36.9 | 45.2 | 38.2 | 35.7 | 33.6 |
| Number of employees | 155,000 | 146,000 | 158,000 | 89,090 | 87,820 | 81,280 | 81,710 | 83,430 | 84,150 | 80,420 |

== Board of directors ==
As of July 2025:

- Kalidas Madhavpeddi (non-executive chairman)
- Gary Nagle (CEO)
- Martin Gilbert (non-executive director)
- Liz Hewitt (non-executive director)
- Gill Marcus (non-executive director)
- Cynthia Carroll (non-executive director)
- John Wallington (non-executive director)
- María Margarita Zuleta (non-executive director)
