= Ivan Glasenberg =

South African-Swiss billionaire businessman

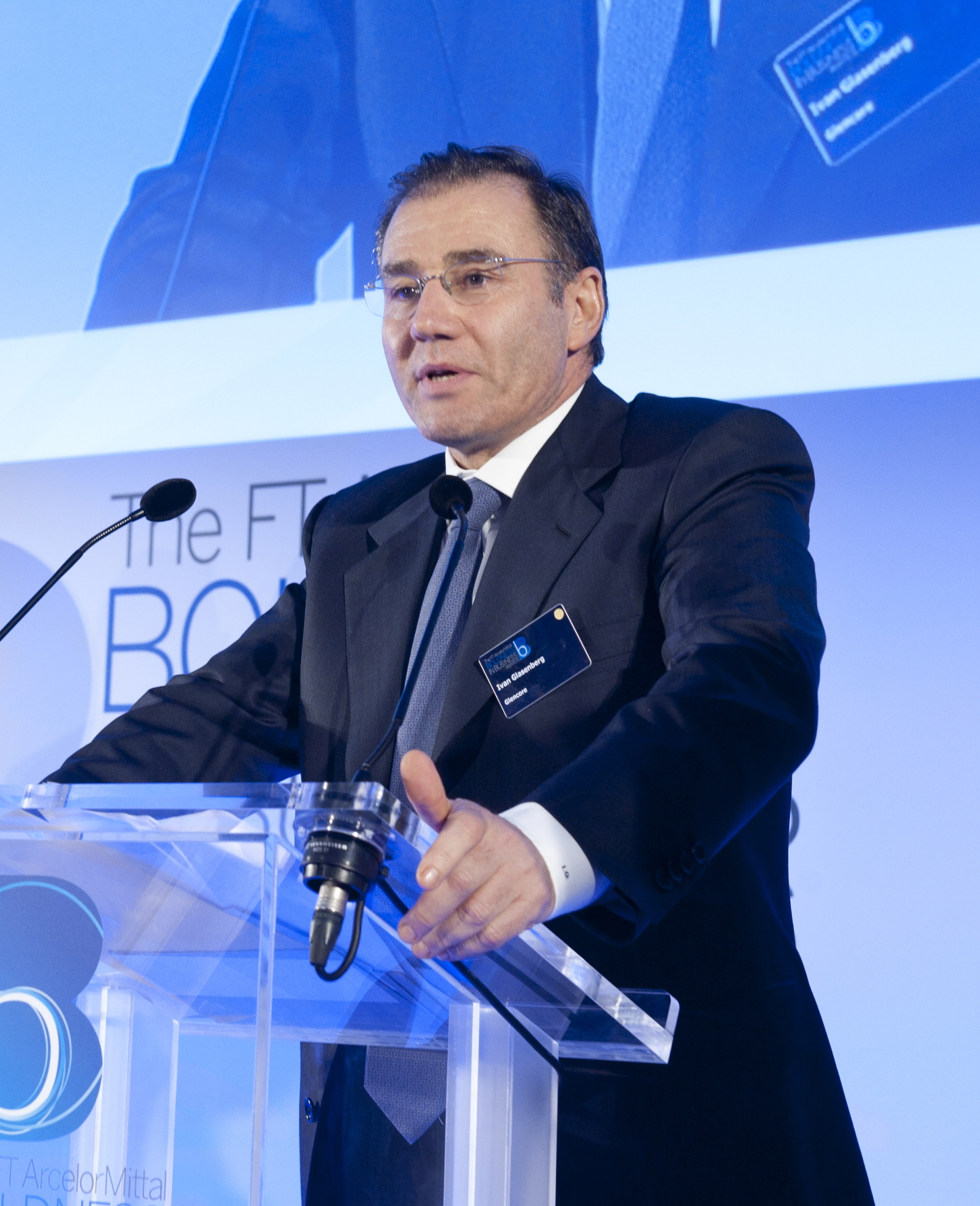
- Glasenberg in 2013
- Born: 7 January 1957 (age 69); Johannesburg, South Africa
- Education: University of Witwatersrand (BCom, BAcy); University of Southern California (MBA)
- Occupation: Businessman
- Known for: President & CEO of Glencore

Ivan Glasenberg (born 7 January 1957) is a South African business executive and former chief executive officer of Glencore, one of the world's largest commodity trading and mining companies. He was the company's CEO from 2002 to 2021. Glasenberg has or had citizenship of South Africa and Australia. He became a Swiss citizen in 2011. As of 2026, his net worth was assessed at approximately US$13.9 billion by Forbes ; and at A$13.3 billion in the Australian Financial Review 2025 Rich List.

== Background and early career ==
Glasenberg was born 7 January 1957 in South Africa to a Jewish family. His father, Samuel Glasenberg, was a luggage manufacturer and importer born in Lithuania, and his mother, Blanche Vilensky, was South African. The family lived in Illovo, a suburb of Johannesburg. He began attending Hyde Park High School in 1974. Glasenberg was an athlete, and by his early 20s was national junior champion in race walking.

Glasenberg graduated with a Bachelor of Commerce and a Bachelor of Accountancy from the University of the Witwatersrand, South Africa. Glasenberg was with Nexia Levitt Kirson, a firm of chartered accountants, for five years and is a Chartered Accountant, South Africa [CA (SA)]. He received his MBA from the IBEAR program at University of Southern California in 1983.

== Business career ==
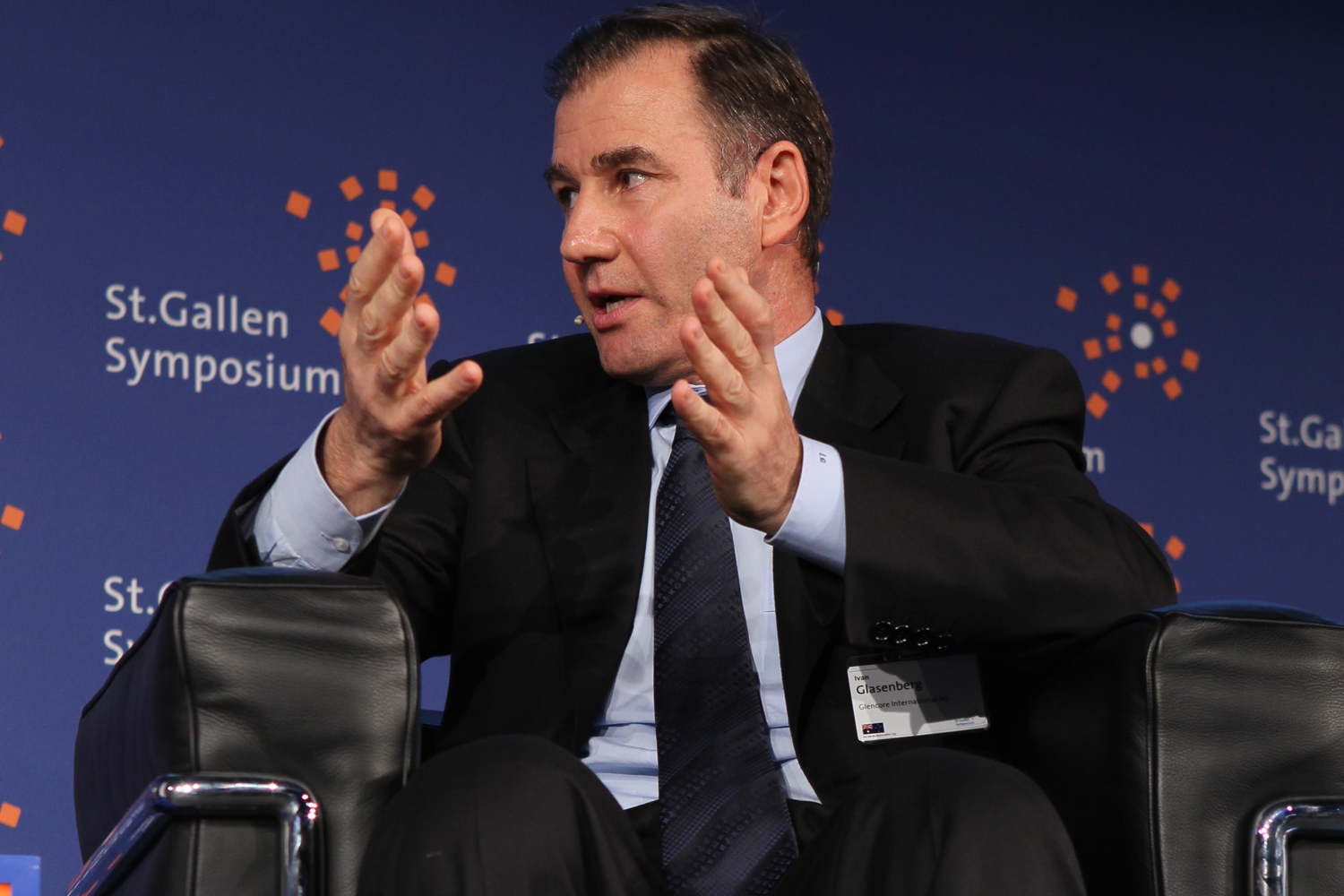
Glasenberg

=== Glencore ===
Glasenberg joined Glencore in 1984, working in the coal department in South Africa and Australia. He managed Glencore's Hong Kong and Beijing offices from 1989 to 1990, and became head of the company's coal department in 1991. He was named CEO in 2002.

In 2005, BusinessWeek referred to Glasenberg as a key figure in the secretive commodities trading of Marc Rich's company Mark Rich & Co. Rich was a billionaire commodities trader, who was charged with tax evasion and illegal deals with Iran, but later pardoned by US President Bill Clinton. Glencore is the corporate successor to Marc Rich & Co.

In September 2011, using his own dividends, Glasenberg started buying a larger share of Glencore, buying up to an additional US$54 million of Glencore stock. In April 2012 it was reported that Glasenberg held more than 15 per cent of Glencore's stock, placing him as the 20th richest mining billionaire, with Forbes estimating his net worth at US$7.3 billion.

Glasenberg has also been an executive director of Xstrata (since 2002); and as a non-executive director of Minara Resources (since 2000); of Rusal (since 2007); and Century Aluminum Co (between 2010 and 2011).

=== Glencore and Xstrata merger ===
Glasenberg became CEO of the merged entity created when Glencore and Xstrata finalised one of the largest mining company mergers in history creating an US$88 billion company. Originally, Xstrata CEO Mick Davis was to be CEO while Glasenberg would be President in a merger-of-equals transaction; however, due to the holding out of major Xstrata shareholder Qatar, it became a takeover target, with a 3.05 Glencore to 1 Xstrata share exchange to create the new entity Glencore Xstrata, with Glasenberg becoming CEO. Davis left the company in July 2013. The merger also caused a rift between Glasenberg and Davis.

=== Retirement ===
In December 2020, Glasenberg announced that he will be retiring in 2021 thus stepping out of the CEO position after nearly 20 years. Glasenberg's final activities as the CEO of Glencore were holding presidential meetings in Kazakhstan and Tajikistan, overseeing the appointment of a new chair and he closed a deal to buy out the company's other partners in a large Colombian coal mine. He was succeeded by fellow South African Gary Nagle, who was running the firm's coal business. As of January 2025, Glasenberg was the largest shareholder of Glencore.

== Personal life ==
Glasenberg has been a champion race-walker for both South Africa and Israel, and runs and swims daily to maintain his fitness. Glasenberg is a resident of the village of Rüschlikon in Switzerland. Glasenberg paid 360 million SFr (£240m) in taxes to Rüschlikon following Glencore's flotation on the London Stock Exchange. The money enabled the residents to cut their taxation rate by 7%, which was approved by large majority after a public vote, and attracted criticism from some villagers about Glencore's alleged controversial business practices.

=== Net worth ===
| Year | Financial Review Rich List | | Forbes Australia's 50 Richest | |
| Year | Rank | Net worth (A$) | Rank | Net worth (US$) |
|---|---|---|---|---|
| 2022 | 9 ▼ | $12.20 billion ▼ | | |
| 2023 | 8 ▲ | $17.60 billion ▲ | | |
| 2024 | 9 ▼ | $14.86 billion ▲ | | |
| 2025 | 8 ▲ | $13.30 billion ▼ | | |

Legend
| Icon | Description |
|---|---|
| Steady | Has not changed from the previous year |
| ▲ | Has increased from the previous year |
| ▼ | Has decreased from the previous year |

== Honours ==
- Russia
  - Recipient of the Order of Friendship (2017)
