= Jeremy Weir =

Australian businessman

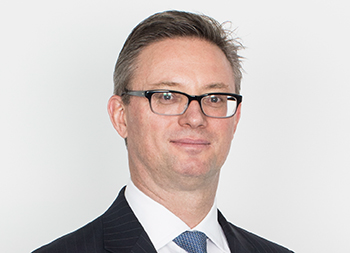
- Born: 1964 (age 61–62); Melbourne, Australia
- Education: University of Melbourne
- Occupations: CEO, Trafigura
- Term: March 2014-
- Predecessor: Claude Dauphin

Jeremy Weir (born 1964) is an Australian businessman, the CEO of Trafigura since March 2014, when he succeeded Claude Dauphin.

== Early life ==
Weir was born in Melbourne, Australia in 1964. He has a bachelor's degree in geology from the University of Melbourne, Australia.

== Career ==
Weir worked for at N M Rothschild & Sons from 1992 to 2000, in Australia and London, and was responsible for commodity trading, marketing and their international metals derivatives business.

Prior to becoming the CEO, Weir was head of mining and market risk.

Since becoming CEO, Weir has made efforts to make Trafigura's operations more open to public scrutiny, and in April 2015 was the first Trafigura CEO to speak in public.
