= 2006 Ivory Coast toxic waste dump =

Health crisis in the Ivory Coast

The 2006 Ivory Coast toxic waste dump was a health crisis in the Ivory Coast in which a ship registered in Panama, the Probo Koala, chartered by the Singaporean-based oil and commodity shipping company Trafigura Beheer BV, offloaded toxic waste to an Ivorian waste handling company which disposed of it at the port of Abidjan. The local contractor, a company called Tommy, dumped the waste at 12 sites in and around the city in August 2006. The dumping, which took place against a backdrop of instability in Abidjan as a result of the country's first civil war, allegedly led to 17 deaths and 20 hospitalisations, with a further 26,000 people treated for symptoms of poisoning.

In the days after the dumping, almost 100,000 Ivorians sought medical attention after Prime Minister Charles Konan Banny opened the hospitals and offered free healthcare to the capital's residents.

Trafigura originally planned to dispose of the slops – which resulted from cleaning the vessel and contained 500 tonnes of a mixture of fuel, caustic soda, and hydrogen sulfide – at the port of Amsterdam in the Netherlands. The company refused to pay the Dutch company Amsterdam Port Services (APS) for disposal after APS raised its charge from €27 to €1,000 per cubic meter (equivalent to €38 and €1,420 in 2023). The Probo Koala was reportedly turned away by several countries before offloading the toxic waste at the Port of Abidjan. An inquiry in the Netherlands in late 2006 confirmed the composition of the waste substance.

Trafigura denied any waste was transported from the Netherlands, saying that the substances contained only tiny amounts of hydrogen sulfide, and that the company did not know the substance was to be disposed of improperly. After two Trafigura officials who traveled to Ivory Coast to offer assistance were arrested and subsequently attacked in jail, the company paid US$198 million (equivalent to US$320 million in 2025) for cleanup to the Ivorian government, without admitting wrongdoing in early 2007. A series of protests and resignations of Ivorian government officials followed this deal.

In 2008, a group of almost 30,000 Ivorians launched a civil lawsuit against Trafigura in London. Trafigura agreed to a settlement of £30 million (US$42.4 million, equivalent to £49 million in 2025 or US$63 million in 2025) to end the suit. Law firm Leigh Day, which represented the Ivorian claimants, was later ruled to have been negligent in the way it paid out the settlement, £6 million of which was embezzled by Ivorian government officials.

== Incident ==
=== Background ===
In 2002, Mexican state-owned oil company Pemex began to accumulate significant quantities of coker gasoline, containing large amounts of sulfur and silica, at its Cadereyta refinery. By 2006 Pemex had run out of storage capacity and agreed to sell the coker gasoline to Trafigura. In early 2006, Pemex trucked the coker gasoline to Brownsville, Texas, where Trafigura loaded it aboard the Panamanian registered tanker Probo Koala, which was owned by Greek shipping company Prime Marine Management Inc. and chartered by Trafigura.

Trafigura was dealing with coker naphtha, a dirty by-product of refining crude oil containing high levels of mercaptans. Mercaptans themselves are organic compounds containing sulphur with an exceptionally strong odor. Trafigura used a process known as "caustic washing" to combine caustic soda with coker naphtha to capture the mercaptans and create a refined, sellable gasoline allowing the company to turn a high profit while simultaneously avoiding the high costs of proper refinery processes. This process had never been tried at sea before Trafigura had done so on Probo Koala, ultimately leading to the accumulation of hazardous waste and the remains of coker naphtha on board the ship. The waste resulting from the caustic washing would typically include hazardous substances such as sodium hydroxide, sodium sulfide and phenols.

=== Dumping ===
Without the proper knowledge of how to dispose of the toxic waste generated, Trafigura contacted various countries as a means of offloading the waste, primarily through the disguise of waste due to normal ship operations. On 2 July 2006, Trafigura attempted to dispose of the waste aboard the Probo Koala in Amsterdam. The transfer of half the waste at the port triggered an environmental incident after people in the surrounding areas complained of the pungent smells and experienced nausea, dizziness, headaches, and breathing difficulties. At high concentrations, hydrogen sulphide gas, responsible for the odors released by the transfer of this waste, can have severe consequences, including coma, convulsions, and sometimes death. In response to the odor, Amsterdam Port Services (APS) took samples of the waste for testing, however the results of these tests were not returned until October 2006-- well past the dumping of waste in Abidjan. On the basis of early test results, APS increased their processing fees from 27€ per m^{3} (approximately $34 USD) to 1,000€ (approximately $1,300 USD), more than 37 times their original asking. After rejecting this offer, Trafigura requested the slop previously unloaded to be pumped back into the tanks on the vessel.

The Probo Koala departed Amsterdam on 5 July 2006 for Paldiski, Estonia, with the full knowledge and approval of the Dutch authorities but without the intention of dumping their waste. After taking on unleaded gasoline in Paldiski, the ship left Estonia on 13 July 2006 on a previously-planned voyage to Lagos, Nigeria. However, according to international and European law on the movement of waste, the lack of proper inspection of waste, and the lack of information provided on the intended destination of the waste, the ship itself should have triggered further investigation prior to its departure from Estonia. Information regarding a third-party disposal company quoting a cost of 5,500€ (approximately $7,000 USD) influenced the decision of Trafigura to dump their hazardous waste in Lagos. In Lagos it unloaded the gasoline. Two offers to unload the slops in Lagos were refused by the captain and on 17 August 2006, new orders directing the ship to Abidjan, Côte d'Ivoire were carried out.

An agreement with a small, local, newly licensed company known as Compagnie Tommy was made prior to the illegal dumping of waste with a per unit cost of $30-35 USD per m^{3}. On 19 August 2006, the Probo Koala offloaded more than 500 tons of toxic waste at the Port of Abidjan, Côte d'Ivoire. Trucks and drivers contracted by Compagnie Tommy were responsible for transport of the waste to Akouédo, the agreed upon dumping site as per the contract. However, after the emanating smells began making workers at the dumping site sick, the site closed several hours earlier than originally indicated and prevented further trucks from discharging their waste. As a result of the site closure, truckers began dumping waste across Abidjan at random locations near houses, workplaces, schools, fields of crops, and the city prison. Even today, there are only 18 known dumping points from this event due to data released by the UN Operational Satellite Applications Program, with a complete picture of the location of all the waste dumped in Abidjan still missing.

=== Immediate effects ===
The health impact was immediate following the dumping of waste across the region. The morning of the 20th, the day after the offloading, a suffocating and rotten smell was reported by residents around Abidjan. People began entering the hospital in waves with similar complaints of headaches, breathing difficulties, and burning sensations of the eyes, skin and nose, requiring immediate medical attention. As more dump sites were uncovered, more people began seeking medical treatment. In response, the Minister of Health declared a medical emergency that expanded in accordance with the further discoveries of dump sites across the city. Over the following days and weeks, more extreme health problems, including neurological, respiratory, and ophthalmological effects and symptoms, overwhelmed existing medical infrastructure and led to dependence on newly designated treatment facilities per the medical emergency response declaration. At the peak of this crisis, nearly 8,000 people per day sought medical attention and treatment.

== Aftermath ==
=== Deaths and illnesses ===
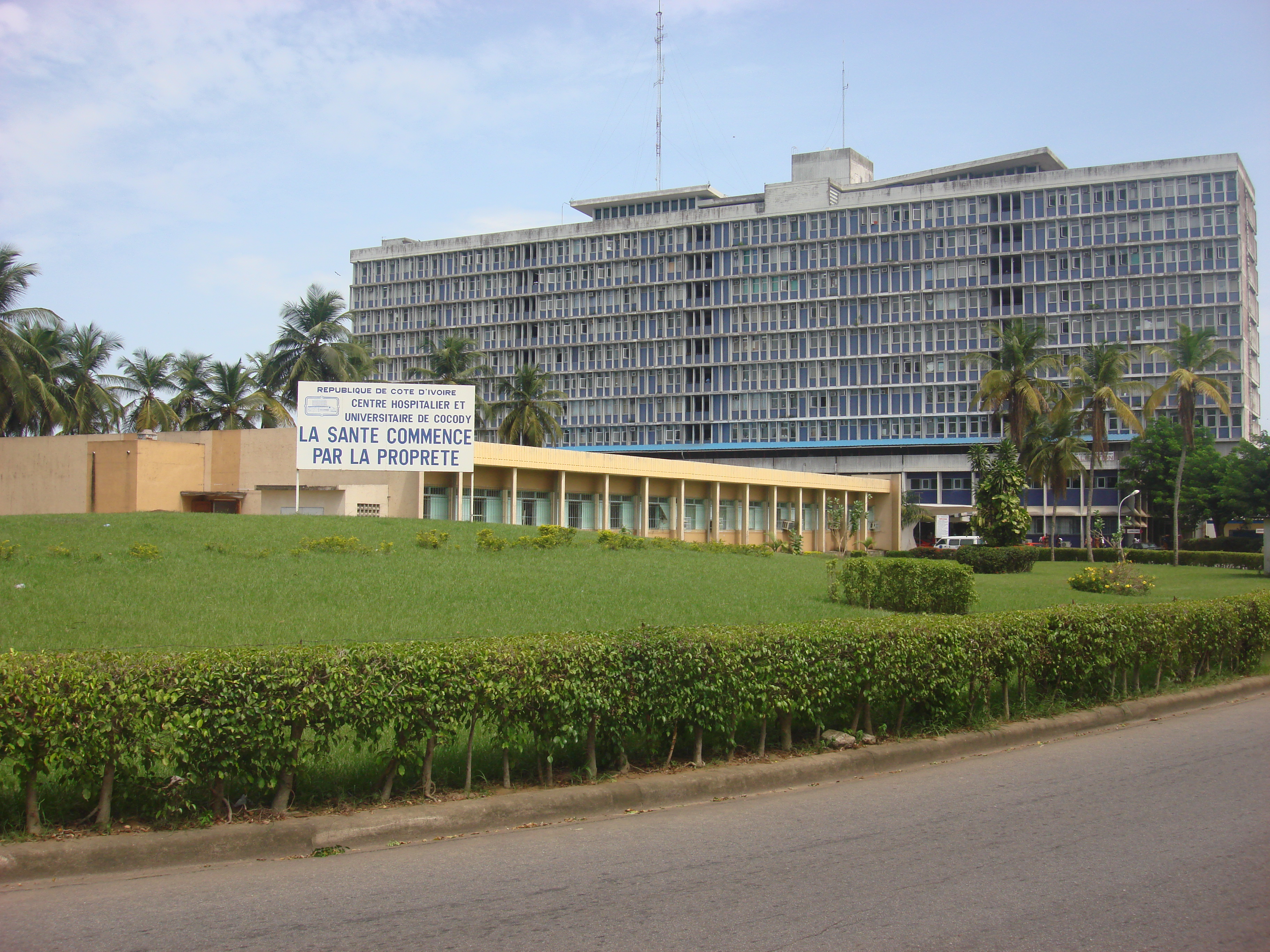
University of Cocody Hospital Centre Abidjan, one of the hospitals which received thousands of patients in August and September 2006 following the dumping of 500 tonnes of toxic waste products around the city

In the weeks following the incident the BBC reported that 17 people died, 23 were hospitalized, and a further 40,000 sought medical treatment (due to headaches, nosebleeds, and stomach pains). These numbers were revised upward over time, with the numbers reported by the Ivorian government in 2008 reaching 17 dead, dozens severely ill, 30,000 receiving medical treatment for ailments connected to the chemical exposure, of almost 100,000 seeking medical treatment at the time. While the company and the Ivorian government continue to disagree on the exact make up of the chemicals, specialists from the United Nations, France, and the Dutch National Institute of Public Health and the Environment (RIVM) were sent to Abidjan to investigate the situation.

=== Company claims ===
In response to the health crisis unfolding in Abidjan, Trafigura claimed that the waste was dirty water ("slops") used for cleaning the ship's gasoline tanks, but a Dutch government report, as well as an Ivorian investigation, disputed this, finding it to be toxic waste. Further company claims insinuated lack of proper waste disposal to be the fault of Compagnie Tommy rather than their own. Additionally, citing evidence from their own testing, Trafigura claimed the waste disposal could not have caused the death and ongoing health concerns throughout Abidjan, no matter how poorly their third-party contractor may have handled the situation. During an ongoing civil lawsuit by over 30,000 Ivorian citizens against Trafigura, a Dutch government report concluded that the liquid dumped contained two 'British tonnes' of hydrogen sulfide. Trafigura, following an investigative report by the BBC's Newsnight program, announced on 16 May 2009 that they would sue the BBC for libel.

=== Fall of government ===
Following revelations by local press and government on the extent of the illnesses involved, the nine-month-old transitional government of Prime Minister Charles Konan Banny resigned. The government vowed to provide treatment and pay all medical costs associated with the waste dump.

In the aftermath of the crisis, many top government figures resigned. This mass resignation has been called "unprecedented" in Côte d'Ivoire's history. In an effort to prevent the contamination of the food chain, large numbers of livestock (among them 450 pigs) affected by the dump were culled.

=== Lawsuits ===
On 11 November 2006, a £100 million lawsuit was filed in the High Court in London by the UK firm Leigh Day & Co. alleging that "Trafigura were negligent and that this, and the nuisance resulting from their actions, caused the injuries to the local citizens." Martyn Day, of Leigh Day & Co said, "This has been a disaster on a monumental scale. We hold Trafigura fully to account for all the deaths and injuries that have resulted from the dumping of their waste." In response, Trafigura announced on Monday 13 November 2006 that it had started libel proceedings against British lawyer Martyn Day, of Leigh Day & Co.

On 20 September 2009, both cases were dropped in an out-of-court settlement. Trafigura announced it would pay more than $46 million to claimants, noting that 20 independent experts had examined the case but were "unable to identify a link".

The package would be divided into groups of $1,546 which would then be paid to 31,000 people. The deal came soon after a report by the UN claimed there was "strong prima facie evidence" that the waste was responsible for injuries. The company responded by saying they were "appalled at the basic lack of balance and analytical rigour reflected in the report." The Ivorian National Federation of Victims of Toxic Waste said Trafigura was trying to avoid a legal case. Trafigura claimed that at least 75% of the receivers of money agreed with the deal.

In January 2010, The Guardian reported that solicitors Leigh Day, working for the victims of toxic poisoning, had been ordered by a Côte d'Ivoire court to transfer victim's compensation to a "shadowy local organisation", using the account of Claude Gouhourou, a "community representative". Martyn Day, a partner in the firm, feared that the cash would not reach the victims.

=== Arrests ===
Shortly after it became apparent that the toxic waste from the Probo Koala had led to the outbreak of sickness, two Trafigura executives, Claude Dauphin and Jean-Pierre Valentini, travelled to Abidjan. They were arrested on 18 September, four days after their arrival, and were held in Abidjan's Maca prison, charged with breaking Côte d'Ivoire's laws against poisoning. There were several reported attacks of the two executives during their imprisonment. Trafigura called for their immediate release, but this did not occur until a settlement for the cleanup was paid to the Ivorian government.

Seven Ivorians were eventually brought to trial in Abidjan for their part in the dumping. The head of the Ivorian contractor who dumped more than 500 tonnes of toxic liquid was sentenced to 20 years in prison in November 2008.

=== European response ===
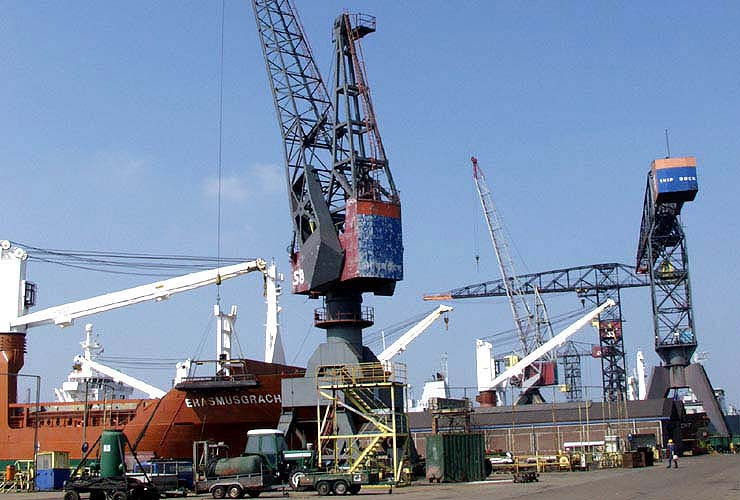
The industrial docks at Amsterdam-Noord, Netherlands.

The Probo Koala had its cargo rejected in Europe by Amsterdam Port Services BV, and was to be charged €500,000 in nearby Moerdijk. On 19 August it offloaded a liquid waste in Abidjan, paying around €18,500 for its disposal.

According to the City of Amsterdam's report, before it dumped the waste in Abidjan, the Probo Koala was in port in the Netherlands from 2 to 5 July 2006. There the ship attempted to have the waste processed in Amsterdam, but Amsterdam Port Services BV, the company that had contracted to treat the waste, refused after its staff reported a noxious odor coming from the waste, which sickened several workers. A company specializing in the disposal of chemical waste, Afvalstoffen Terminal Moerdijk in nearby Moerdijk, tendered for the disposal of the waste (based on the samples it received) for €500,000. Instead, the material was pumped back into the Probo Koala, which then left port on 5 July, appearing on 19 August in Côte d'Ivoire, where Compagnie Tommy, which was registered only days before the arrival of the Probo Koala, was contracted for €18,500 to dispose of the waste.

The company contends that no waste was transported from Europe, and the incident was an accident caused by the mishandling by an Ivorian company of waste water used to wash the ship's storage tanks. A Dutch newspaper reported on this possibility, saying the waste could have been generated as a result of attempted on-board desulfurisation (removing mercaptans) of naphtha in a Merox-like process. In this way high mercaptan-laden gasoline is upgraded to meet certain country-specific specifications. This would explain the water/caustic soda/gasoline mix and also the presence in trace amounts of a certain catalyst called ARI-100 EXL (cobalt phthalocyanine sulphonate), generally used in this process. It would on the other hand not explain the presence of hydrogen sulfide, as the final stage of the Merox process is an organic disulfide unless the attempt at desulfurisation had failed. The company has always contended that the amount of hydrogen sulfide in the waste was small. Press and government findings contend there was a substantial amount of hydrogen sulfide dumped, some 2 tonnes, of the 500 tonnes of dumped liquid.

== Investigative inquiries ==
=== Ivorian government findings ===
A November 2006 Ivorian government report into the incident said that Trafigura was to blame for the dumping of waste, and was aided by Ivorians. A government committee concluded that Trafigura knew that the nation had no facilities to store such waste and knowingly transported the waste from Europe to Abidjan.

The report further claimed that the "Compagnie Tommy" which actually dumped the substance "shows all the signs of being front company set up specifically to handle the Trafigura waste", and was "established in a period between Trafigura's decision not to pay for expensive waste disposal in Amsterdam and its ship's arrival in Abidjan."

The government fact-finding committee had no prosecutorial powers, and its findings were rejected by the company. The committee also found that officials in the Port of Abidjan and a variety of local and national bodies either failed to plug holes in environmental laws or were guilty of ignoring laws through corruption.

=== Dutch inquiry ===
On 6 December 2006, an independent inquiry launched by the City of Amsterdam concluded that the city was negligent when they allowed Trafigura to take waste back on board the Probo Koala in Amsterdam in July. Part of the Probo cargo was offloaded with the intent to have it processed with an Amsterdam waste processing company but when this turned out too expensive Trafigura took it back. The responsible local civil servants were reportedly unaware of existing Dutch environmental laws that would not allow its export given these circumstances. On 19 December 2006, a majority of the Dutch House of Representatives expressed their desire for a new investigation into the Probo Koala. On 8 January 2007, The Guardian reported that the legal team for Leigh Day had arrived in Abidjan, and would begin taking statements from thousands of witnesses in the area.

In late 2008, a criminal prosecution was begun in the Netherlands by the Dutch Public Prosecutors office. While the trial was not scheduled to begin until late 2009, the head of Trafigura, Claude Dauphin, was specifically cited as not under indictment. Rather the company itself, the captain of the Probo Koala, and Amsterdam port authorities would be charged with "illegally transporting toxic waste into and out of Amsterdam harbour" and falsification of the chemical composition of the ship's cargo on documents.

The Dutch Supreme Court ruled on 6 July 2010, that the Court of Appeal should review again whether Claude Dauphin can be prosecuted for his part in the Probo Koala case, specifically for leading the export of dangerous waste materials. Earlier the Court of Appeal had ruled that this was not possible.

On 23 July 2010, Trafigura were fined €1 million for the transit of the waste through Amsterdam before being taken to the Côte d'Ivoire to be dumped. The court ruled that the firm had concealed the problem when it was first unloaded from a ship in Amsterdam. While previous settlements had been made in the case this was the first time Trafigura have been found guilty under criminal charges over the incident. On 16 November 2012, Trafigura and the Dutch authorities agreed to a settlement. The settlement obliged Trafigura to pay the existing 1 million euro fine, and in addition, the company must also pay Dutch authorities a further 300,000 euros in compensation - the money it saved by dumping the toxic waste in Abidjan rather than having it properly disposed of in the Netherlands. The Dutch also agreed to stop the personal court case against Trafigura's chairman, Claude Dauphin, in exchange for a 67,000 euro fine.

=== Company payment ===
On 13 February 2007, Trafigura agreed to pay the Ivorian government £100 million (US$198m) for the clean-up of the waste; however the group denied any liability for the dumping, and as a part of the deal the government would not pursue further action against the group. The Trafigura employees Claude Dauphin, Jean-Pierre Valentini and Nzi Kablan, held by the Côte d'Ivoire authorities after the incident, were then released and charges were dropped against them. Further prosecutions against Ivorian citizens not employed by Trafigura continued.

== Suppression of information ==
=== Legal controversy ===
In September 2006, Trafigura commissioned the internal "Minton Report" to determine the toxicity of the waste dumped in Abidjan. The Minton Report was subsequently leaked to the WikiLeaks web site and remains available there.

On 11 September 2009, Trafigura, via lawyers Carter-Ruck, obtained a secret "super-injunction" against The Guardian, banning that newspaper from publishing the contents of the Minton report. Trafigura also threatened a number of other media organisations with legal action if they published the report's contents, including the Norwegian Broadcasting Corporation and The Chemical Engineer magazine. On 12 October, Carter-Ruck warned The Guardian against mentioning the content of a parliamentary question that was due to be asked about the Minton Report. Instead the paper published an article stating that they were unable to report on an unspecified question and claiming that the situation appeared to "call into question privileges guaranteeing free speech established under the 1689 Bill of Rights". The suppressed details rapidly circulated via the Internet and Twitter and, amid uproar, Carter-Ruck agreed the next day to the modification of the injunction before it was challenged in court, permitting The Guardian to reveal the existence of the question and the injunction. The 11 September 2009 injunction remained in force in the United Kingdom until it was lifted on the night of 16 October.

The report contains discussion of various harmful chemicals "likely to be present" in the waste—sodium hydroxide, cobalt phthalocyanine sulfonate, coker naphtha, thiols, sodium alkanethiolate, sodium hydrosulfide, sodium sulfide, dialkyl disulfides, hydrogen sulfide—and notes that some of these "may cause harm at some distance".

The report says potential health effects include "burns to the skin, eyes and lungs, vomiting, diarrhea, loss of consciousness and death", and suggests that the high number of reported casualties is "consistent with there having been a significant release of hydrogen sulphide gas".

The version published on WikiLeaks, which has been republished by The Guardian, appears to be a preliminary draft, containing poor formatting and one comment in French. Trafigura has stated that the report was only preliminary and was inaccurate.

=== BBC report ===
Faced with a libel case which under British law could drag on for years and cost millions of pounds on 10 December 2009, the BBC removed the original story entitled "Dirty Tricks and Toxic Waste in the Ivory Coast", along with accompanying video, from its website. The story featured interviews with victims in Côte d'Ivoire, including relatives of two children who, it claimed, died from the effects of the waste. The story also claimed that Trafigura brought "ruin" on the country in order to make a "massive profit". The stories remain available on WikiLeaks. On 15 December 2009, the broadcaster agreed to apologise to Trafigura for the "Dirty Tricks" report, pay £25,000 to charity, and withdraw any allegation that Trafigura's toxic waste dumped in Africa had caused deaths.

But at the same time, the BBC issued a combative statement, pointing out that the dumping of Trafigura's hazardous waste had led to the British-based oil trader being forced to pay out £30m in compensation to victims. "The BBC has played a leading role in bringing to the public's attention the actions of Trafigura in the illegal dumping of 500 tonnes of hazardous waste", the statement said. "The dumping caused a public health emergency with tens of thousands of people seeking treatment."

The BBC did not agree to remove further allegations about the dumping such as 16 September article:- "Trafigura knew of waste dangers"; this quoted from internal Trafigura emails which showed that the company knew the waste was toxic before they dumped it. In one, a Trafigura employee says "This operation is no longer allowed in the European Union, the United States and Singapore" it is "banned in most countries due to the 'hazardous nature of the waste'" and another says "environmental agencies do not allow disposal of the toxic caustic."

=== Awards ===
On 24 April 2010, the International Consortium of Investigative Journalists presented the Daniel Pearl Award for Outstanding International Investigative Reporting to the team of journalists who had revealed the story of Trafigura and the Côte d'Ivoire toxic waste dump. The award went to the British journalists Meirion Jones and Liz MacKean from BBC Newsnight and David Leigh from The Guardian, Synnove Bakke and Kjersti Knudsson from Norwegian TV, and Jeroen Trommelen from the Dutch paper De Volkskrant. The citation says the award was for reports "which exposed how a powerful offshore oil trader tried to cover up the poisoning of 30,000 West Africans".

== Probo Koala ==
The vessel (renamed Gulf Jash) was initially heading to Chittagong, Bangladesh for dismantling. However, the Government of Bangladesh imposed a ban on the ship from entering into its waters and therefore, as of June 2011, the ship was reportedly headed for Alang, India. In August 2011 it was again renamed the Hua Feng. In 2012 the ship, renamed to Hua Wen, was operating between China and Indonesia, and in 2013 she entered a ship breaking yard in Taizhou, China where she was due for demolition.

== See also ==
- Health crisis
