= Marc Rich =

Belgian-American commodities trader (1934–2013)

- Born: Marcell David Reich; December 18, 1934; Antwerp, Belgium
- Died: June 26, 2013 (aged 78); Lucerne, Switzerland
- Citizenship: Belgium, Bolivia, United States, Israel, Spain
- Occupation: Founder of Glencore
- Known for: Banking, trading activities
- Spouses: Denise Eisenberg (m. 1966; div. 1996); Gisela Rossi (m. 1996; div. 2005)

Marc Rich (born Marcell David Reich; December 18, 1934 – June 26, 2013) was a Belgian-American commodities trader, financier, and businessman. He founded the commodities company Glencore and was later indicted in the United States on federal charges of tax evasion, wire fraud, racketeering, and selling Iranian oil to Israel during the Iran hostage crisis. He fled to Switzerland at the time of the indictment and never returned to the United States.

He received a widely criticized presidential pardon from President Bill Clinton, on his last day in office. Rich had donated large sums to Israeli officials and organizations, which had pleaded extensively on his behalf. Rich's ex-wife Denise had also made donations to the Democratic Party.

== Early life ==
Rich was born in 1934 to a Jewish family in Antwerp, Belgium. In 1941 his parents emigrated with their son to the United States to escape the Nazis. They traveled via Vichy France, Spain, Portugal, and the liner Serpa Pinto.

His father opened a jewelry store in Kansas City, Missouri, then moved the family to Queens, New York City in 1950, where he started a company that imported Bengali jute to make burlap bags, and later started a business trading agricultural products and helped found the American Bolivian Bank (Banco Boliviano Americano S.A). Rich attended high school at the Rhodes Preparatory School in Manhattan. He later attended New York University, but dropped out after one semester to work for Philipp Brothers (now known as Phibro LLC) in 1954 where he worked with Pincus Green.

== Business career ==
At Philipp Brothers, he eventually became a dealer in metals, learning about the international raw materials markets and commercial trading with poor, third world nations. He helped run the company's operations in Cuba, Bolivia, and Spain. In 1974, he and co-worker Pincus Green set up their own company in Switzerland, Marc Rich + Co. AG, which would later become Glencore Xstrata Plc.

Nicknamed "the King of Oil" by his business partners, Rich was said to have expanded the spot market for crude oil in the early 1970s, drawing business away from the larger established oil companies that had relied on traditional long-term contracts for future purchases. As Andrew Hill of the Financial Times put it, "Rich's key insight was that oil – and other raw materials – could be traded with less capital, and fewer assets, than the big oil producers thought, if backed by bank finance. It was this leveraged business model that became the template for modern traders, including Trafigura, Vitol, and Glencore". (Note: Ronald Greenwald, an Orthodox rabbi from Brooklyn, was Rich's commodity trader in New York.)

His tutelage under Philipp Brothers afforded Rich the opportunity to develop relationships with various dictatorial régimes and embargoed nations. Rich would later tell biographer Daniel Ammann that he had made his "most important and most profitable" business deals by violating international trade embargoes and doing business with the apartheid regime of South Africa. He also counted Fidel Castro's Cuba, Marxist Angola, the Nicaraguan Sandinistas, Muammar Gaddafi's Libya, Nicolae Ceaușescu's Romania, and Augusto Pinochet's Chile among the clients he served. According to Ammann, "he had no regrets whatsoever.... He used to say 'I deliver a service. People want to sell oil to me and other people wanted to buy oil from me. I am a businessman, not a politician.'"

Later, following the overthrow of Mohammad Reza Pahlavi, the Shah of Iran, during the Iranian Revolution in 1979, Rich used his special relationship with Ayatollah Khomeini, the leader of the revolution, to buy oil from Iran despite the American embargo. According to Forbes Magazine, Asadollah Asgaroladi was also the secret business partner of Rich in helping bypass U.S. sanctions against Iran after the Iranian revolution. Iran would become Rich's most important supplier of crude oil for more than 15 years. Rich sold Iranian oil to Israel through a secret pipeline. Due to his good relationship with Iran and Ayatollah Khomeini, Rich helped give Mossad's agents contacts in Iran.

He popularised the use of letters of credit in the oil trade.

His real estate company, Marc Rich Real Estate GmbH, was involved in large developer projects (e.g., in Prague, Czech Republic). Rich and Marvin Davis bought 20th Century Fox in 1981. Due to the indictment filed against Rich for violating U.S. trade sanctions against his deals with Iran while Rich was living in Switzerland, his assets including his holding in 20th Century Fox were frozen. Davis was permitted by authorities to purchase Rich's holding and subsequently sold this to Rupert Murdoch for $232 million during March 1984.

Rich had ties to many mafia associates in the Soviet Union and, subsequently, the former Soviet Union, such as the Georgian-Israeli Grigori Loutchansky who owns the Austrian-based oil exporting company Nordex and who was involved in the Iridium satellite constellation, (Note: Roger Tamraz, a Lebanese-American who is close to Grigori Loutchansky, spearheaded the Baku to Ceyhan pipeline lobbying effort during the Clinton administration. He also made a key donation to the Democratic Party.) (Note: Loutchansky is close to Aslan Abashidze who is fiercely opposed to Eduard Shevardnadze.) and especially in the Russian Mafia, such as Marat Balagula, who was convicted of gasoline price fixing.

Business Insider reported Rich had an estimated net worth of US$2.5 billion.

== U.S. indictment and pardon ==
2001 The Controversial Pardon of International Fugitive Marc Rich

In 1983, Rich and partner Pincus Green were indicted on 65 criminal counts, including income tax evasion, wire fraud, racketeering, and trading with Iran during the oil embargo (at a time when Iranian revolutionaries were still holding American citizens hostage). The charges would have led to a sentence of more than 300 years in prison had Rich been convicted on all counts. The indictment was filed by then-U.S. Federal Prosecutor (and future mayor of New York City) Rudolph Giuliani. At the time, it was the biggest tax evasion case in U.S. history.

Learning of the plans for the indictment, Rich fled to Switzerland and, always insisting that he was not guilty, never returned to the U.S. to answer the charges. (Note: In 1989 the U.S. Justice Department ceased using statutes of the Racketeer Influenced and Corrupt Organizations Act (otherwise known as the RICO Act) in tax cases such as the one in which Rich and Green were indicted, and began relying instead on civil lawsuits.) Rich's companies eventually pleaded guilty to 35 counts of tax evasion and paid $90 million in fines, although Rich himself remained on the Federal Bureau of Investigation's Ten Most-Wanted Fugitives List for many years, narrowly evading capture in Britain, Germany, Finland, and Jamaica. Fearing arrest, he did not even return to the United States to attend his daughter's funeral in 1996.

On January 20, 2001, hours before leaving office, U.S. President Bill Clinton granted Rich a controversial presidential pardon. Leonard Garment, Richard Nixon's acting Special Counsel who had replaced John Dean during Watergate, had both Rich and Rich's business partner Pincus Green as a client since spring 1985 with Scooter Libby representing them as their attorney for the pardon until spring 2000 when Jack Quinn became their attorney. (Note: According to a House Committee on Government Reform report, however, "The arguments made by Garment, [William Bradford] Reynolds and Libby [in their testimony] focused on the claim that Rudy Giuliani of the SDNY was criminalizing what should have been a civil tax case. They did not make, compile, or in any other way lay the groundwork for, or make a case for a Presidential pardon. When former President Clinton stated that they 'reviewed and advocated' 'the case for the pardons,' he suggested that they were somehow involved in arguing that Rich and Green should receive pardons. This was completely untrue". (p. 162)) Several of Clinton's strongest supporters distanced themselves from the decision. Former President Jimmy Carter, a fellow Democrat, said, "I don't think there is any doubt that some of the factors in his pardon were attributable to his large gifts. In my opinion, that was disgraceful." Clinton himself later expressed regret for issuing the pardon, saying that "it wasn't worth the damage to my reputation."

Clinton's critics alleged that Rich's pardon had been bought, as Denise Rich had given more than $1 million to Clinton's political party (the Democratic Party), including more than $100,000 to the Senate campaign of the president's wife, Hillary Rodham Clinton, and $450,000 to the Clinton Library foundation during Clinton's time in office.

Clinton also cited clemency pleas he had received from Israeli government officials, including then-Prime Minister Ehud Barak. Rich had made substantial donations to Israeli charitable foundations over the years, and many senior Israeli officials, such as Shimon Peres and Ehud Olmert, argued on his behalf behind the scenes. Many leading figures of the Jewish world such as Abraham Foxman, the head of the Anti-Defamation League (ADL), whose organization had received over $250,000 from Rich over the years also wrote to President Clinton for Rich's pardon. Among other leading Jewish leaders writing to Clinton were Shlomo Ben-Ami, Israel's former foreign minister; Michael Steinhardt, a philanthropist and CEO of Steinhardt Associates; and Rabbi Irving Greenberg, chairman of the United States Holocaust Memorial Council, which oversees the U.S. Holocaust Memorial Museum. Although none of the figures other than Foxman were investigated for their support of Rich's pardon, Clinton later claimed on more than one occasion that pressure from Jewish communities and the Israeli government contributed to his decision to pardon Rich. He stated in an interview with The New York Times that "Israeli officials of both major political parties and leaders of Jewish communities in America and Europe urged the pardon of Mr. Rich." He made similar comments off camera to CNBC's Geraldo Rivera that "Israel did influence me profoundly".

Speculation about another rationale for Rich's pardon involved his alleged involvement with the Israeli intelligence community. Rich reluctantly acknowledged in interviews with his biographer, Daniel Ammann, that he had assisted the Mossad, Israel's intelligence service, a claim that Ammann said was confirmed by a former Israeli intelligence officer. According to Ammann, Rich had helped finance the Mossad's operations and had supplied Israel with strategic amounts of Iranian oil through a secret oil pipeline. Avner Azulay, a former high-ranking Mossad agent and executive director of two of Rich's philanthropic foundations in Israel since 1993, who played a central role in coordinating the pardon effort, was the one who persuaded Rich's ex-wife (divorced in 1996) Denise to personally ask President Clinton to review Rich's pardon request. Azulay was also the one who asked Ehud Barak, whom he knew through his prior work at Mossad, to appeal to President Clinton on behalf of Rich for clemency. Barak subsequently raised the issue with Clinton on several occasions. A former Mossad chief, Shabtai Shavit, had also urged Clinton to pardon Rich, who he said had routinely allowed intelligence agents to use his offices around the world.

Federal Prosecutor Mary Jo White was appointed by Attorney General John Ashcroft to investigate Clinton's last-minute pardon of Rich. She stepped down before the investigation was finished and was replaced by James Comey, who was critical of Clinton's pardons and of then-Deputy Attorney General Eric Holder's pardon recommendation. Rich's lawyer, Jack Quinn, had previously been Clinton's White House Counsel and chief of staff to Clinton's vice president, Al Gore, and had had a close relationship with Holder. According to Quinn, Holder had advised that standard procedures be bypassed and the pardon petition be submitted directly to the White House. (Note: Holder, however, during his Senate confirmation hearing to become Attorney General in 2009, denied that he had attempted to circumvent the standard procedures for consideration of presidential pardons. Holder did say that he had "made mistakes" and "made assumptions that turned out not to be true" while managing the pardon request.) Congressional investigations were also launched. Clinton's top advisors, Chief of Staff John Podesta, White House Counsel Beth Nolan, and advisor Bruce Lindsey, testified that nearly all of the White House staff advising the president on the pardon request had urged Clinton to not grant Rich a pardon. Federal investigators ultimately found no evidence of criminal activity.

As a condition of the pardon, it was made clear that Rich would drop all procedural defenses against any civil actions brought against him by the United States upon his return there. That condition was consistent with the position that his alleged wrongdoing warranted only civil penalties, not criminal punishment. Rich never returned to the United States.

In a February 18, 2001, op-ed essay in The New York Times, Clinton (by then out of office) explained why he had pardoned Rich, noting that U.S. tax professors Bernard Wolfman of the Harvard Law School and Martin Ginsburg of Georgetown University Law Center had concluded that no crime had been committed, and that Rich's companies' tax-reporting position had been reasonable. In the same essay, Clinton listed Lewis "Scooter" Libby as one of three "distinguished Republican lawyers" who supported a pardon for Rich. (Libby himself later received a presidential commutation from President George W. Bush, and later a presidential pardon from President Donald Trump for his involvement in the Plame affair.) During Congressional hearings after Rich's pardon, Libby, who had represented Rich from 1985 until the spring of 2000, denied that Rich had violated the tax laws but criticized him for trading with Iran at a time when that country was holding U.S. hostages.

A New York Times editorial called the Marc Rich pardon "a shocking abuse of presidential power."

On November 1, 2016, the FBI released documents related to the pardon, stating it was an FOIA release.

== Paradise Papers ==
On November 5, 2017, the Paradise Papers, a set of confidential electronic documents relating to offshore investment, revealed that the Appleby law firm had worked for Rich and Glencore on major projects in the past, even after his indictment in 1983.

== Legacy ==
Glencore International AG was a corporate successor to "Marc Rich + Co AG." At the end of 1993, Rich lost control of the company when a disastrous attempt to corner the world zinc market led to a number of the Rich Boys insisting he give up his majority stake. After a management buyout, Marc Rich + Co was renamed Glencore on 1 September 1994.

Ivan Glasenberg was appointed chief executive in 2002. Glencore merged in 2013 with Xstrata (formerly Südelektra Holding AG) to become Glencore Xstrata, headquartered in Baar, Switzerland. Until the 2011 Glencore IPO, and the Glencore/Xstrata merger of 2013, Glencore was run as a private partnership. Following the merger, Glencore's website says that the company was founded in 1974 as Marc Rich + Co AG, and also refers to the management buyout from Marc Rich in 1993. In 2001, the Zug based Crown Resources AG, which is associated with Alfa Group, merged with the Zug-based Marc Rich & Co. Investment AG (MRI), which is the Swiss-based commodities trading arm of the Marc Rich Holding company, to create a commodities trading house. Trafigura Beheer BV, based in Netherlands, is another corporate successor, though not ever owned or directly managed by Rich. It was created in March 1993, the name acquired from an existing company registered in Amsterdam. Its founding partners, alongside Claude Dauphin, were former Marc Rich top brass. Trafigura AG is now the main office, and is located in Geneva, Switzerland.

== Citizenship ==
Although Rich believed that he had relinquished his United States citizenship when he became a citizen of Spain, an appeals court ruled in 1991 that, for purposes of U.S. law, Rich remained a citizen and therefore was still subject to U.S. income taxes. He also held Belgian, Bolivian, Israeli, and Spanish passports.

== Support for Israel ==
Rich was a strong supporter of Israel throughout his life, having donated around $150 million to institutions such as the Israel Museum, Tel Aviv Museum, research centers, theaters, as well as numerous other documented causes over the years.

In 1985, Rich helped with the compensation to the families of the Israeli victims of the Ras Burqa massacre in the Sinai. He contributed tens of millions of dollars for the absorption of Jewish immigrants from Ethiopia and Russia, he contributed to Project Discovery, he founded the museum wing for Israeli and international art in the name of his late daughter Gabriela, he contributed to the establishment of the new building of the Tel Aviv Cinematheque called "Marc Rich Israeli Cinema Center," and the establishment of the main library at IDC Herzliya University, which bears his name. Rich was also an advocate for coexistence between Israelis and the Palestinians, establishing health and education programs in the West Bank and Gaza, as well as by fulfilling his commitment to making President's Conference contributions each year. Rich also contributed to the Center for Sloan-Catherine, The Medical Research Center at Yale University, The Rabin Medical Center, and the center of the Dana Farber Cancer Institute.

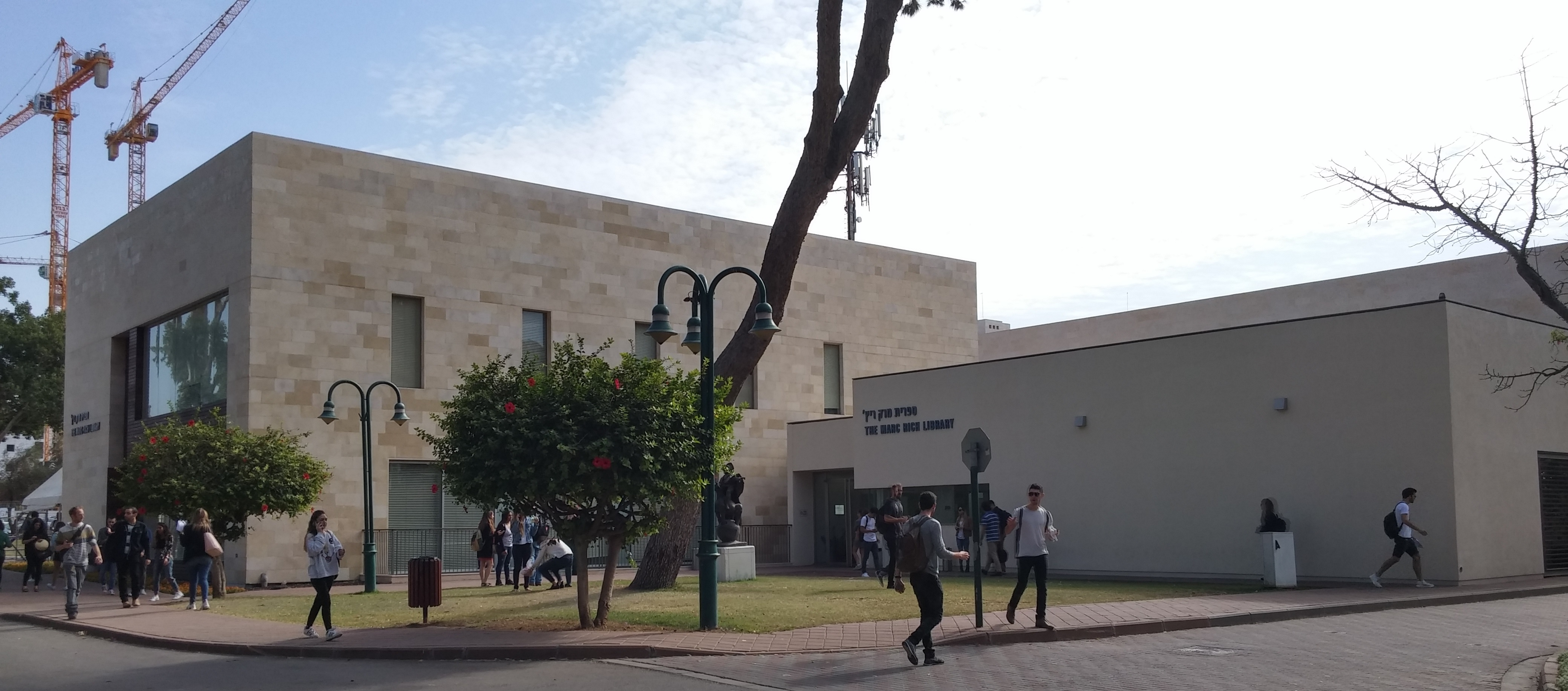
The Marc Rich Library (c. 2016) at Reichman University

Rich created the Rich Foundation, one of the largest funds operating in Israel, which has invested more than $135 million in the last two decades. The fund was established with the assistance of Avner Azulay, who wrote to Clinton for the Rich pardon, Rich's ex-wife Denise, and his business partners, Elka Acle and Pincus Green. The fund has contributed over the years to cultural, educational, and other Israeli programs in support of Humanities and Social Sciences at Tel Aviv University, the Israel Philharmonic Orchestra, the Tel Aviv Cinematheque, the city of Beersheba, the Reichman University, the Shaare Zedek Medical Center, the Beit Berl settlement, the Tel Aviv Museum of Art, and the Israel Museum. Rich also financed the construction of the Bioengineering building at Bar Ilan University.

== Awards ==
In May 2007, Rich received an honorary doctorate from Bar Ilan University, Ramat Gan, Israel, in recognition of his contribution to Israel and to the university's research programs. He received the same honor from Ben-Gurion University of the Negev, Beersheba, Israel, on 18 November 2007. The Chaim Sheba Medical Center at Tel Hashomer in suburban Tel Aviv, Israel, honored Rich with the Sheba Humanitarian Award 2008. Former recipients of this award include actor Michael Douglas, actress Elizabeth Taylor, and former U.S. President Gerald R. Ford.

== Personal life ==
In 1966, Rich married Denise Eisenberg, a songwriter and heir to a New England shoe manufacturing fortune. They had three children, one of whom, Gabrielle Rich Aouad, was diagnosed with leukemia and died in Seattle aged 27, in 1996, reportedly never having been visited by her father while in treatment due to the likelihood of him being arrested if he had come to the United States. Another daughter, Ilona Rich, married Kenny Schachter, and lost her oldest son, Kai, to suicide in 2019. Marc Rich and Denise divorced in 1996; she continued to use the name Denise Rich. Six months later, he married German-born Italian widow Gisela Rossi; they divorced in 2005.

After spending several years in Zug, Switzerland, Rich moved to Meggen, a city in the Canton of Lucerne, Switzerland, residing in a house called "La villa rose" (the pink villa) on the shores of lake Lucerne, where he zealously guarded his privacy. Rich owned property in the ski resort of St. Moritz, Switzerland, and in Marbella, Spain. He was an art collector, and friends said that he lived surrounded by Renoirs, Monets, and Picassos.

Rich died of a stroke on June 26, 2013, at a Lucerne hospital. He was 78 and survived by two daughters, Ilona Schachter-Rich and Danielle Kilstock-Rich. His body was buried in Israel.

== See also ==
- Bill Clinton pardon controversy
- List of people pardoned by Bill Clinton

== Bibliography ==
- Ammann, Daniel (2009). The King of Oil: The Secret Lives of Marc Rich. New York: St. Martin's Press. ISBN 978-0-312-57074-3.
- Copetas, A Craig (1985). Metal Men: Marc Rich and the 10-Billion-Dollar Scam. New York: Putnam. ISBN 0-399-13078-0.
