= Daniel Ammann =

Swiss journalist and author

Daniel Ammann (born 1963) is a Swiss journalist and author. He was educated at University of Zurich, UC Berkeley and Fondation Post Universitaire Internationale in Paris. He holds an MA in political science, history and constitutional law.

Ammann is best known for his biography of Marc Rich, the controversial commodities trader and founder of Glencore who received a presidential pardon from U.S. President Bill Clinton. The King of Oil – The Secret Lives of Marc Rich became an international bestseller and was published in nine languages. The book is to be cinematized by Universal Pictures with Matt Damon slated to portray the fugitive billionaire. John Krasinski would be a producer through his Sunday Night Productions.

Ammann's research into unlawful methods of investigation by the Office of the Attorney General of Switzerland triggered one of the biggest judicial scandals in the country's recent history and led to the resignation of Attorney General Valentin Roschacher.

== Recognition ==
In 2010, Ammann was named Swiss Business Journalist of the Year. In 2007 he won the renowned Georg von Holtzbrinck Prize for Business Journalism. In 2006, he was awarded the Swiss Media Prize for Finance Journalism.

== Books ==
- The King of Oil: The Secret Lives of Marc Rich, St. Martin's Press 2009, ISBN 978-0-312-57074-3
