= The King of Oil =

2009 book by Daniel Ammann

The King of Oil: The Secret Lives of Marc Rich
- Hardcover edition
- Author: Daniel Ammann
- Language: English
- Subject: Marc Rich, commodity trading
- Genre: Non-fiction
- Published: October 13, 2009
- Publisher: St. Martin's Press
- Publication place: United States
- Media type: Print, e-book
- Pages: 320 pages
- ISBN: 978-0312570743
- OCLC: 695771883

The King of Oil: The Secret Lives of Marc Rich is a non-fiction book by Swiss investigative journalist Daniel Ammann. The book was initially released on October 13, 2009 by St. Martin's Press. It became an international bestseller and was published in nine languages.

== Synopsis ==
The book focuses on the biography of Marc Rich, a prominent international financier and commodity trader, who became a billionaire in the 1970s, arguably inventing the spot market for oil, grain, and metals. His Switzerland-based corporation Marc Rich + Co. AG actively traded with the apartheid regime of South Africa, Iran under Ayatollah Khomeini, Cuba, Nigeria under dictator Sani Abacha, China, the Soviet Union, and later Russia. Indicted on some 65 criminal counts, including income tax evasion, wire fraud, racketeering, and trading with Iran during the oil embargo, Rich, nevertheless, received a widely criticized presidential pardon from U.S. President Bill Clinton on his last day in office.

== Reception ==
Bloomberg named the book one of the best business books of the year and called it a "must-read". The Daily Beast called it a "journalistic coup". A reviewer of The New York Times wrote "the usually tight-lipped Mr. Rich gave an extensive account of his oil trading". Le Monde commented "The book reads like a thriller". A reviewer of Kirkus Reviews stated "A walking-on-eggshells attempt to shed light on arguably the most influential oil trader of our time... A flawed biography that reveals more about capitalist societies’ willful ignorance and ethical conundrums than the secret lives of its inscrutable subject." A reviewer of Publishers Weekly commented "An empathetic look at the notorious Marc Rich, one of the most successful and controversial commodities traders in recent history and a key figure in the invention of the spot market... This meticulous account sets the record straight on a reluctant public figure who lost in the court of public opinion, but escaped being tried in a court of law."

== Film ==
The book is rumoured to be cinematized by Universal Pictures with Matt Damon slated to portray the fugitive billionaire. John Krasinski will be a producer through his Sunday Night Productions.
