= Democratic Republic of the Congo–United States relations =

- DR Congo: United States

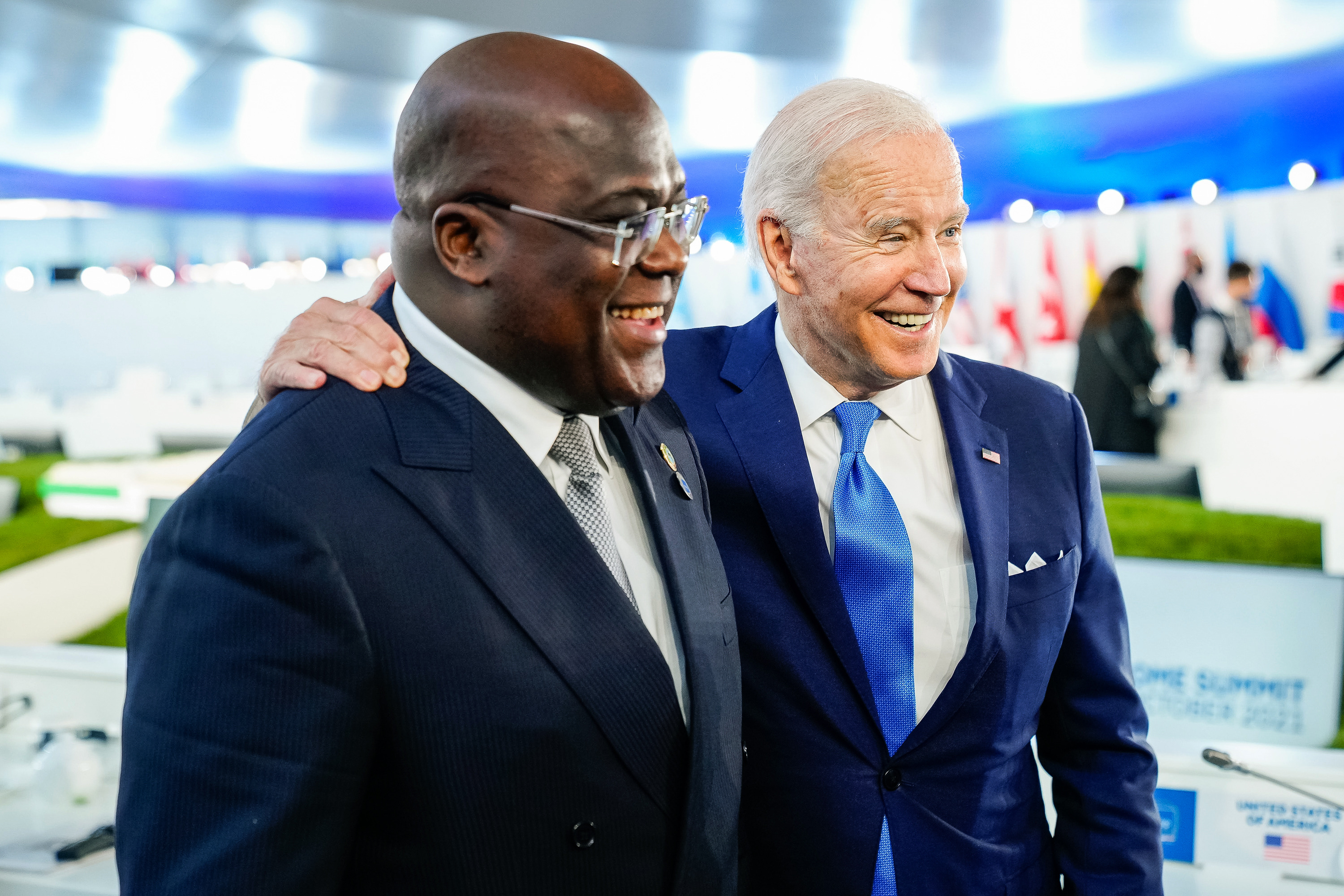
Félix Tshisekedi with Joe Biden at the 2021 G20 Rome summit

Democratic Republic of the Congo–United States relations refers to international bilateral relations between the Democratic Republic of the Congo and the United States of America.

== Historical relations ==
=== Early relations ===
Relations between the United States and the DR Congo began in the midst of the Cold War, when the Congo gained independence from Belgium on June 30, 1960. Shortly after independence, the Congo fell into crisis: in the province of Katanga, Moïse Tshombé declared the secession of Katanga on July 11, 1960, supported by Belgian, British, and French interests. The US provided diplomatic support for the territorial integrity of the young state and the United Nations operation in Congo. By January 1963, international and Congolese troops, with US support, had succeeded in ending the Katanga conflict and reintegrating the province into the Congo. At the same time, the US played a controversial role in the overthrow and assassination of Patrice Lumumba, the Congo's first prime minister. Lumumba was considered a risk factor by the US because of his neutralist and Pan-African orientation and his contacts with the Soviet Union, and he was suspected of being close to communism. President Eisenhower reportedly gave the order to assassinate Lumumba in August 1960. The CIA then examined several options for killing Lumumba, including poisoning his food and even his toothpaste. On September 5, 1960, President Kasavubu dismissed Lumumba from office, presumably on US advice; Lumumba initially resisted. A few days later, on September 14, 1960, Colonel Joseph-Désiré Mobutu, encouraged by CIA station chief Lawrence Devlin, staged a coup against Lumumba and effectively took control of Léopoldville (Kinshasa). Lumumba was ultimately assassinated by separatist forces in Belgian-backed Katanga on January 17, 1961. The exact circumstances remained controversial for decades, but it is clear that American, Belgian, and Congolese actors collaborated in Lumumba's downfall. In the years that followed, the DR Congo experienced various governments, with the US attempting to create a pro-Western state through aid payments and military support against the separatists.

=== Under Mobutu Sese Seko and Zaire (1965–1997) ===
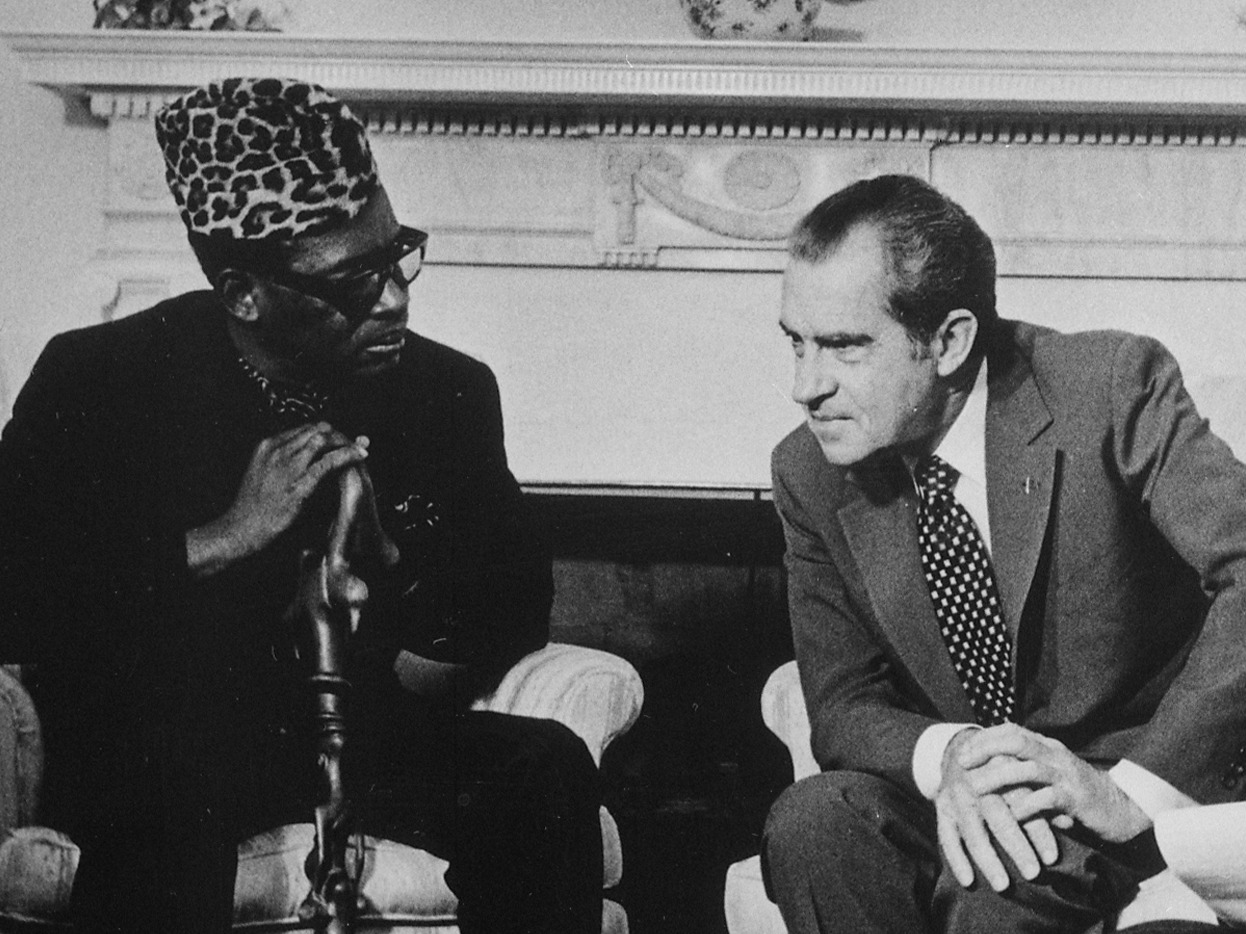
Mobutu Sese Seko with Richard Nixon in the White House (1973)

On November 24, 1965, Mobutu – now a general – staged a second coup and seized absolute power in Congo. He established an authoritarian regime and renamed the country Zaire in 1971. His reign was also marked by unprecedented corruption and looting of the state. During the three decades of his rule, relations between the US and Mobutu Sese Seko were characterized by close, interest-driven cooperation. Washington viewed Mobutu as a reliable bulwark against communism in Africa during the Cold War and provided his regime with extensive economic and military aid. From 1965 onwards, Mobutu received hundreds of millions of US dollars in aid until the US Congress largely stopped this support in 1990 due to human rights concerns. The CIA, also worked closely with Mobutu: Zaire served as a supply base for Western-backed rebel movements in neighboring countries. For years, the CIA funneled money and weapons through Mobutu's channels to anti-communist guerrillas in Angola. Mobutu was effectively considered the “CIA's man” in Central Africa – observers assumed that his rise had been largely orchestrated by US intelligence agencies. Mobutu also established discreet links to Western elite networks. He was a member of the exclusive “1001 Club” – a circle of business magnates and politicians founded by Prince Bernhard of the Netherlands, which financed the environmental foundation WWF and facilitated informal contacts.

While security cooperation often took place behind the scenes, Mobutu also maintained close official contacts with the US government. He visited the United States several times on state visits or for working meetings. US President Ronald Reagan, for example, received Mobutu in Washington in August 1983 and praised him as “a voice of reason and goodwill” in Africa. On the world stage, Mobutu repeatedly sought opportunities to present his country in a positive light to the West. A famous example of this is the “Rumble in the Jungle” in 1974: Mobutu financed this spectacular boxing match between Muhammad Ali and George Foreman with US$10 million, bringing a global media event to Kinshasa. The fight, organized by promoter Don King, took place in Zaire on the condition that Mobutu's government would provide the prize money. The regime staged the event as a sign of African strength and a symbol of friendship with the US, as Ali was an American sports hero. The “Rumble in the Jungle” brought Zaire worldwide attention and, in retrospect, can be seen as the high point of the relations between Mobutu's regime and the United States.

=== The fall of Mobutu and the Congo Wars (1990s) ===
After the end of the Cold War, Mobutu and his regime lost their strategic value for the US. Under pressure from calls for democratization and due to his increasingly desolate style of government, Washington's support for Mobutu declined significantly. In 1990, the US government largely stopped direct aid, and from 1993 onwards, Mobutu was openly regarded as an obstacle to stability in the region. In the 1990s, resistance grew in Zaire while Mobutu fell seriously ill. The US took on a role in the diplomatic transition process as Mobutu's rule drew to a close. In April 1997, shortly before rebel troops under Laurent-Désiré Kabila reached the capital, the White House publicly declared that Mobutu's era was inevitably coming to an end. In an unusually sharp tone, it called for political change in Kinshasa. Presidential spokesman Mike McCurry spoke of “Mobutism” as nothing more than a chapter in history and emphasized that Zaire now needed a government that would meet the needs of the people. In May 1997, Mobutu fled into exile and Kabila took power in Kinshasa, which was approved by the US, which had long since abandoned its old ally.

Shortly after Mobutu's fall, however, the Second Congo War (1998–2003) broke out, involving numerous African states. Kabila fell out with his former allies Rwanda and Uganda in 1998, who then invaded the Congo. This complex confrontation – often referred to as the “African World War” – presented diplomatic challenges for the US. Rwanda and Uganda were considered partners of the US in the 1990s, with Rwanda's President Paul Kagame in particular under American protection after the Rwandan genocide of 1994. Initially, US observers were sympathetic to Rwanda's intervention in eastern Congo, as it was officially aimed at pursuing genocide militias. However, as the bloody conflict progressed, international accusations grew that Rwanda and Uganda were systematically plundering Congo's natural resources. Washington's stance shifted accordingly: US diplomats signaled to Kigali and Kampala that their continued military presence would no longer be tolerated.

At the same time, the US supported peace efforts for the DR Congo. After Laurent Kabila was assassinated in 2001, his son Joseph Kabila took over the presidency. The young president quickly sought support from the international community. In February 2001, Joseph Kabila met with Rwandan President Kagame in Washington to explore a peaceful solution. With diplomatic backing from the US and other actors, the Second Congo War, which had claimed up to five million lives, formally ended in 2003, after the signing of different peace agreements. The US subsequently supported the UN mission (MONUC) and reconstruction in Congo and provided humanitarian aid to the war-torn country.

=== Recent times ===
In the 2000s, the Kabila government cooperated with the US primarily in development projects, health programs (such as those to combat HIV/AIDS) and in building the new Congolese army. President Joseph Kabila visited the US several times, meeting with President George W. Bush in 2003 and 2007 and with President Barack Obama at the United States–Africa Leaders Summit 2014. American diplomacy urged Kabila to implement economic reforms and measures against corruption in order to open up the war-torn country to investment. However, relations remained tense. Joseph Kabila came under international criticism, particularly from 2015 onwards, as signs multiplied that he intended to remain in power beyond his constitutional term of office. The US called for a democratic transfer of power and threatened sanctions against Kabila's inner circle. In November 2016, the US Congress passed a bill almost unanimously that provided for targeted sanctions against Congolese government officials who obstructed a “peaceful democratic transition through credible elections.” Washington's clear stance, together with pressure from the EU and the African Union, contributed to presidential elections finally taking place at the end of 2018, after two postponements. In 2019, Félix Tshisekedi succeeded Kabila as president of the Congo.

Under President Tshisekedi, diplomatic ties between Kinshasa and Washington deepened once again. Tshisekedi actively sought the support of Western partners to implement reforms and resolve the ongoing conflicts in eastern Congo. In May 2024, however, relations were thrust into the spotlight by an explosive incident: on May 19, 2024, an armed group led by exiled Congolese opposition figure Christian Malanga attempted a coup against Tshisekedi in Kinshasa. Malanga was killed in the fighting; several people, including bystanders, died during the failed coup attempt. Among those arrested were three US citizens who had apparently been involved in Malanga's mercenary group. In September 2024, a military tribunal in Kinshasa sentenced a total of 37 defendants, including the three Americans, to death for “murder, terrorism, and conspiracy.” In April 2025, the Democratic Republic of the Congo (DRC) commuted the death sentences of three American citizens convicted of participating in a failed coup attempt in May 2024, reducing their sentences to life imprisonment. Among those convicted were Malanga's son, Marcel Malanga, and two other Americans, Tyler Thompson Jr. and Benjamin Zalman-Polun. The commutations came amid ongoing U.S.-DRC negotiations on mineral deals and security cooperation, including plans for a U.S. delegation visit to support peace efforts in eastern DRC. Tshisekedi pardoned the three US citizens in April 2025 and had them transferred to the US, where they were charged.

In 2025, President Félix Tshisekedi proposed a deal to U.S. President Donald Trump, offering mining opportunities in exchange for assistance in combating the M23 rebel group. This proposal underscores the DRC's vast reserves of minerals like cobalt, lithium, copper, and tantalum, which are vital to American tech industries. Additionally, the U.S. signed a Memorandum of Understanding with the DRC and Zambia to jointly develop a supply chain for electric vehicle batteries, highlighting the strategic importance of the DRC's mineral wealth. In addition, The United States served as a mediator in the talks that led to a Congolese peace agreement with neighboring Rwanda.

In April 2026, the Democratic Republic of Congo agreed to accept third-country deportees from the United States on the understanding that the "scheme was not a "permanent relocation mechanism or an outsourcing of migration policies." The first batch of 15 deportees, who were reportedly from South American countries, arrived in the DRC on 19 April.

== Economic relations ==
The United States is one of the largest trading partners with the Democratic Republic of the Congo. The United States exports $253 million in produced goods to the DRC a year, and the United States imports $323.1 million a year from the Democratic Republic of the Congo.

The United States is the DRC's largest bilateral donor, providing aid to support development and stability.

== Cultural relations ==
Cultural exchanges between the DRC and the United States have been limited, with interactions primarily facilitated through educational programs and international organizations. Both nations are members of the Congo Basin Forest Partnership, a conservation initiative promoting sustainable management of the Congo Basin's tropical forests. This partnership reflects a shared commitment to environmental preservation and offers avenues for cultural and scientific collaboration.

== Military relations ==
The United States has partnered with the DRC and other Central African nations to enhance regional security. Initiatives like the Tripartite Plus agreement, involving the DRC, Rwanda, Uganda, and Burundi, focus on collaborative security efforts. Additionally, the U.S. has supported United Nations efforts to monitor borders and address conflicts involving rebel groups like the M23. The proposed security pact by President Tshisekedi seeks formal U.S. assistance in combating these rebels, highlighting the ongoing military collaboration between the two nations.

== Principal U.S. Officials ==
- Ambassador— Lucy Tamlyn
- Deputy Chief of Mission— Stephanie Miley

== Diplomatic missions ==
The U.S. Embassy is located in Kinshasa.
