= Government-in-exile =

Governing body located outside its claimed territory

A government-in-exile (GiE) is a political group that claims to be the legitimate government of a sovereign state or semi-sovereign state, but is unable to exercise power and resides in a country distinct from its origin. Governments-in-exile usually plan to one day return to their native country and regain formal power. A government in exile differs from a rump state in the sense that the latter controls at least part of its remaining territory. For example, during World War I, nearly all of Belgium was occupied by Germany, but Belgium and its allies held on to a small slice in the country's west. A government in exile, in contrast, has lost all its territory. However, in practice, the distinction may be unclear; in the above example, the Belgian government at Sainte-Adresse was located in French territory and acted as a government in exile for most practical purposes. Governments-in-exile and associated organisations employ strategies such as investigative reporting and diaspora mobilisation to sustain political visibility, engage supporters, and address ethical and operational challenges.

Governments-in-exile tend to occur during wartime occupation or in the aftermath of a civil war, revolution, or military coup. For example, during German expansion and advance in World War II, some European governments sought refuge in the United Kingdom, rather than face destruction at the hands of Nazi Germany. On the other hand, the Provisional Government of Free India proclaimed by Subhas Chandra Bose sought to use support from the invading Japanese to gain control of the country from British occupiers, and in the final year of WWII, after Nazi Germany was driven out of France, it maintained the remnants of the Nazi-sympathising Vichy government as a French government in exile at the Sigmaringen enclave.

A government in exile may also form from widespread belief in the illegitimacy of a ruling government. Due to the outbreak of the Syrian Civil War in 2011, for instance, the National Coalition for Syrian Revolutionary and Opposition Forces was formed by groups whose members sought to end the rule of the ruling Ba'ath Party.

The governments-in-exile may have little or no recognition from other states. The effectiveness of a government in exile depends primarily on the amount of support it receives, either from foreign governments or from the population of its own country. Some exiled governments come to develop into a formidable force, posing a serious challenge to the incumbent regime of the country, while others are maintained chiefly as a symbolic gesture.

Governments in exile predate the formal use of the term. In periods of monarchical government, exiled monarchs or dynasties sometimes set up exile courts, as the House of Stuart did when driven from their throne by Oliver Cromwell and again at the Glorious Revolution (see James Francis Edward Stuart § Court-in-exile). The House of Bourbon would be another example because it continued to be recognised by other countries at the time as the legitimate government of France after it was overthrown by the populace during the French Revolution. This continued through the rule of Napoleon Bonaparte and the Napoleonic Wars from 1803–04 to 1815. With the spread of constitutional monarchy, monarchical governments which were exiled started to include a prime minister, such as the Dutch government during World War II headed by Pieter Sjoerds Gerbrandy.

The capital of a government-in-exile is known as a capital-in-exile, located outside the government's proclaimed territory. This differs from a temporary capital, which is located somewhere inside the government's controlled territory.

== Current governments-in-exile ==
=== Deposed governments-in-exile ===
==== Deposed governments of current states ====
These governments-in-exile were founded by deposed governments or rulers who continue to claim legitimate authority of the state they once controlled.

Name	Exile since	State controlling its claimed territory	Notes	Refs.
(Belarus) Rada of the Belarusian Democratic Republic	1919	Republic of Belarus	See also: Belarusian Democratic Republic and Polish–Soviet War It is the oldest government in exile in the world, led by Ivonka Survilla since 1997; based in Ottawa, Ontario. Declared an "extremist formation" in Belarus.	
National Unity Government of Myanmar	2021	Republic of the Union of Myanmar	See also: 2021 Myanmar coup d'état This government was formed in response to the 2021 Myanmar coup d'état. The cabinet members of the National Unity Government are in hiding within Myanmar.	

==== Deposed governments of de facto states ====
These governments in exile were founded by deposed governments or rulers who continue to claim legitimate authority of the state they once controlled, even if their claimed territory is now controlled by another country.

Name	Exile since	State controlling its claimed territory	Notes	Refs.
(Tibet) Central Tibetan Administration	1959/2011	People's Republic of China (Tibet Autonomous Region)	See also: Tibetan sovereignty debate and Tibetan independence movement Founded by the Dalai Lama in Dharamsala, India with cooperation of Indian Prime Minister Jawaharlal Nehru.	
Republic of South Maluku	1963/66	Republic of Indonesia (Province of Maluku)	The Republic of South Maluku was an unrecognised independent state that existed between 1950 and 1963. Between 1963 and 1966, the head of government Chris Soumokil was imprisoned on Java. In 1966, after his execution by firing squad by order of President Suharto, Johan Manusama formed a government in exile; based in the Netherlands. John Wattilete is its president.	
Chechen Republic of Ichkeria	2000	Russia (Chechen Republic)	Some members are fighting as rebels against the Russian Armed Forces; based in London. There are contested claims that it has been succeeded by the Caucasus Emirate and the Islamic State – Caucasus Province. In October 2022, during the invasion of Ukraine, as a response to Russia's recognition of the Donetsk People's Republic and Luhansk People's Republic as independent nations, the government of Ukraine voted to recognise the Chechen Republic of Ichkeria as an independent nation.	
Republic of Artsakh	2023	Republic of Azerbaijan (Karabakh & East Zangezur Economic Regions)	The Republic of Artsakh was supposed to dissolve on 1 January 2024, after Artsakh surrendered in the 2023 Azerbaijani offensive against Artsakh. A mass exodus occurred soon after the announcement, and a government-in-exile was set up in Yerevan. 10 days before the state would be dissolved, the President of Artsakh, Samvel Shahramanyan annulled its dissolution, and, despite pushback from the Prime Minister of Armenia, Nikol Pashinyan, it remains in Yerevan.	

==== Deposed governments of subnational territories ====
These governments in exile claim legitimacy of autonomous territories of another state and have been founded by deposed or inactive governments or rulers, who do not claim independence as a separate state.

Name	Exile		Current control of claimed territory		Notes	References
Name	since	as	by	as	Notes	References
Government of the Autonomous Republic of Abkhazia	1993	Autonomous republic	Republic of Abkhazia	de facto independent state	Georgian provincial government, led by Ruslan Abashidze, whose territory is under the control of Abkhaz separatists; based in Tbilisi.	
(Ukraine) Autonomous Republic of Crimea	2014	Autonomous republic	Russia	Republic of Crimea	Ukrainian autonomous republic, whose territory was seized and annexed by Russia in March 2014, following a disputed status referendum; was based in Kherson until the 2022 Russian invasion of Ukraine, now operating remotely in Ukraine.	
(Ukraine) City of Sevastopol	2014	Special city	Russia	Federal city	Ukrainian special city, whose territory was seized and annexed by Russia in March 2014, following a disputed status referendum; was based in Kherson until the 2022 Russian invasion of Ukraine, now operating remotely in Ukraine.	
(Ukraine) Luhansk Oblast	2022	Oblast	Russia	Luhansk People's Republic	Ukrainian oblast, whose territory was partially seized (approx. 30%) by the Luhansk People's Republic (LPR) in 2014, and then subsequently completely seized in 2022 during the 2022 Russian invasion of Ukraine. Russia annexed the LPR on 30 September 2022. Previously, the LPR was a breakaway state formed by Russian-backed separatists. Currently operating remotely in Ukraine, despite Ukraine regaining control of a small slice of Luhansk Oblast's territory near Kharkiv Oblast during the 2022 Ukrainian eastern counteroffensive. By July 2025, Russian forces had captured the last Ukrainian-held areas in Luhansk Oblast, bringing the entire Luhansk Oblast under Russian occupation again.	

=== Alternative governments in exile ===
==== Alternative governments of current states ====
These governments have been founded in exile by political organisations and opposition parties, aspire to become actual governing authorities or claim to be legal successors to previously deposed or inactive governments, and have been founded as alternatives to incumbent governments.

Name	Claimed exile	Exile proclamation	Government presently controlling claimed territory	Notes	References
Committee for the Five Northern Korean Provinces	1949		North Korea	Based in Seoul, the South Korean government's provisional administration for the five pre-1945 provinces which became North Korea at the end of World War II and the division of Korea. The five provinces are North Hamgyeong, South Hamgyeong, Hwanghae, North Pyeongan, South Pyeongan.	
National Council of Resistance of Iran (NCRI)	1981		Islamic Republic of Iran	Political umbrella coalition of Iranian opposition political organisations, the largest organisation being the People's Mujahedin of Iran. Led by Maryam and Massoud Rajavi, based in Paris with the aim to establish the "Democratic Republic of Iran" to replace the current religious rule in Iran.	
Iran National Council (INC)	2013		Islamic Republic of Iran	Political umbrella coalition of Iranian opposition political organisations, led by Prince Reza Pahlavi; based in Potomac, Maryland.	
(South Vietnam) Third Republic of Vietnam	1990	1991	Socialist Republic of Vietnam	The Third Republic of Vietnam, previously named the Provisional National Government of Vietnam, was formed in Orange County, California, by former soldiers and refugees from South Vietnam. Declared a terrorist organisation in Vietnam.	
Third Republic of Equatorial Guinea	2003		Second Republic of Equatorial Guinea	Proclaimed Severo Moto as a president of Equatorial Guinea who seeks to establish Third Republic of Equatorial Guinea and overthrowing Teodoro Obiang's regime; based in Madrid.	
Ukraine Salvation Committee	2014	2015	Ukraine	After the Revolution of Dignity, Prime Minister Mykola Azarov, as well as pro-Russian and pro-Yanukovych members of the Second Azarov government fled to Russia and set up a government in exile. Aims to restore the Azarov government.	
(South Korea) The Provisional Government of Free Joseon	2017		North Korea	Based in Seoul, notable for protecting the family of Kim Jong-nam (including Kim Han-sol) following his assassination in Malaysia.	
(Belarus) Coordination Council	2020		Republic of Belarus	Opposes Alexander Lukashenko's rule, led by candidate Sviatlana Tsikhanouskaya (exiled in Lithuania). Her alleged victory over Lukashenko in a disputed election sparked nationwide protests in order for him to be removed from power. In 2020, Tsikhanouskaya was recognised as the legitimate president by the Rada of the Belarusian Democratic Republic. Declared an "extremist organisation" in Belarus.	
Congress of People's Deputies	2022		Russian Federation	The Congress of People's Deputies is a meeting of former deputies of different levels and convocations from Russia, claiming to be the transitional parliament of the Russian Federation or its possible successor. Former State Duma deputy Ilya Ponomarev became the public initiator of the congress. Sessions of the 1st Congress were held on 5–7 November in Jabłonna, Poland. Does not recognise the results of the 2024 Russian presidential election. Declared an "Undesirable organisation" in Russia.	
United Transitional Cabinet of Belarus	2022		Republic of Belarus	Declared an "extremist organisation" in Belarus.	

==== Alternative separatist governments of current subnational territories ====
These governments have been founded in exile by political organisations, opposition parties, and separatist movements, and desire to become the governing authorities of their territories as independent states, or claim to be the successor to previously deposed or inactive governments, and have been founded as alternatives to incumbent governments.

Name	Claimed exile	Exile proclamation	Government presently controlling claimed territory	Notes	References
Free City of Danzig Government in Exile	1939	1947	Republic of Poland	Based in Berlin.	
(East Turkestan) East Turkistan Government-in-Exile	1949	2004	People's Republic of China	Campaigns for the restoration of an independent East Turkistan; based in Washington, DC.	
United Liberation Movement for West Papua	1963	1969	Republic of Indonesia	Campaigns for an independent Republic of West Papua; based in Vanuatu.	
(Republic of Biafra) Movement for the Actualization of the Sovereign State of Biafra	1970	1999	Federal Republic of Nigeria	An arm of the Movement for the Actualization of the Sovereign State of Biafra, seeking to re-establish the Republic of Biafra; based in Washington, DC.	
Tatarstan	1994	2008	Russian Federation	seeks to establish an Independent state of Tatarstan; based in London	
Republic of Cabinda	1975		Republic of Angola	Based in Paris.	
Council for the Republic	2017		Spain	Based in Brussels. Aims to establish an independent Catalonia based on the 2017 declaration of Independence	
Federal Republic of Ambazonia / Republic of Ambazonia	1999		Republic of Cameroon	Former British mandate and trust territory of Southern Cameroons; declared independence on 31 December 1999.	
Western Kurdistan Government in Exile	2004		Syrian Arab Republic	Aims to found a Kurdish state in Syria; based in London.	
Transnational Government of Tamil Eelam	2009	2010	Sri Lanka	Aims to establish an independent state of Tamil Eelam. Based in New York City	
Kabyle Provisional Government	2010		Algeria	Aims for an independent state of Kabylia; based in Paris	
Western Armenia Government in Exile	2011		Turkey	Aims to establish an independent Republic of Western Armenia; based in Yerevan	

=== Exiled governments of non-self-governing or occupied territories ===
These governments-in-exile are governments of non-self-governing or occupied territories. They claim legitimate authority over a territory they once controlled, or claim legitimacy of a post-decolonisation authority. The claim may stem from an exiled group's election as a legitimate government.

The United Nations recognises the right of self-determination for the population of these territories, including the possibility of establishing independent sovereign states.

Name	Exile since	Government presently controlling claimed territory	Notes	Refs.
State of Palestine (Palestinian Authority)	1988	State of Israel (Palestinian territories)	From the Palestinian Declaration of Independence in 1988 in exile in Algiers by the Palestine Liberation Organization, it has effectively functioned as the government in exile of the Palestinian State. In 1994, however the PLO established the Palestinian National Authority interim territorial administration as result of the Oslo Accords signed by the PLO, Israel, the United States, and Russia. Between 1994 and 2013, the PNA functioned as an autonomy, thus while the government was seated in the West Bank it was not sovereign. In 2013, Palestine was upgraded to a non-member state status in the UN. All of the above founded an ambiguous situation, in which there are two distinct entities: The Palestinian Authority, exercising a severely limited amount of control on the ground and the State of Palestine, recognised by the United Nations and by numerous countries as a sovereign and independent state, but not able to exercise such sovereignty on the ground. Both are headed by the same person—as of 2022, President Mahmoud Abbas—but are judicially distinct.	

=== Current governments regarded by some as a "government-in-exile" ===
These governments once controlled all or most of their claimed territory, but continue to control a smaller part of it while also continuing to claim legitimate authority of the entire territory they once fully controlled.

Name	Year of exile	Territory that the government still controls	Government presently controlling claimed territory	Notes
(Taiwan) Republic of China	1949	Taiwan and associated islands	People's Republic of China	See also: Theory of the Undetermined Status of Taiwan and Chinese Civil War The currently Taipei-based Republic of China government does not regard itself as a government-in-exile, but is claimed to be such by some participants in the debate on the political status of Taiwan. In addition to the island of Taiwan and some other islands it currently controls, the Republic of China formally maintains claims over territory now controlled by the People's Republic of China as well as some parts of Afghanistan, Bhutan, India, Japan, Mongolia, (Note: The Republic of China recognizes Mongolia officially since 2002 [a].) Myanmar, Pakistan, Russia, and Tajikistan. The usual formal reasoning on which this "government-in-exile" claim is based relies on an argument that the sovereignty of Taiwan was not legitimately handed to the Republic of China at the end of World War II, and on that basis the Republic of China is located in foreign territory, therefore effectively making it a government in exile. By contrast, this theory is not accepted by those who view the sovereignty of Taiwan as having been legitimately returned to the Republic of China at the end of the war. Both the government of the People's Republic of China and the Pan-Blue Coalition (including the Kuomintang) in the Republic of China hold the latter view. However, there are also some who do not accept that the sovereignty of Taiwan was legitimately returned to the Republic of China at the end of the war nor that the Republic of China is a government-in-exile, and China's territory does not include Taiwan – in other words, that the Republic of China and the People's Republic of China are two separate countries, the former having sovereignty over Taiwan and the latter over Mainland China. The current Democratic Progressive Party in Taiwan is inclined to this view.

== Former governments in exile ==
Name	Exiled or founded (*) since	Defunct, reestablished (*) or integrated (°) since	State that controlled its claimed territory	Notes	References
Republican Government of Siena	1555	1559	Grand Duchy of Tuscany	After the Italian city-state of Siena was defeated in the Battle of Marciano and annexed to the Grand Duchy of Tuscany, 700 Sienese families did not concede defeat, established themselves in Montalcino and declared themselves to be the legitimate Republican Government of Siena. This lasted until 1559, when Tuscan troops arrived and annexed Montalcino.	
Exile government of the Electoral Palatinate	1622–1623*	1648°	Electorate of Bavaria	In the early stages of the Thirty Years' War, Maximilian I, Elector of Bavaria, occupied the Electoral Palatinate and was awarded possession of it by Ferdinand II, Holy Roman Emperor. In late 1622 and early 1623, the fugitive Frederick V, Elector Palatine organised a Palatinate government-in-exile at The Hague. This Palatinate Council was headed by Ludwig Camerarius, replaced in 1627 by Johann Joachim Rusdorf. Frederick himself died in exile in 1632, but his son and heir Charles Louis was able to regain the Lower Palatinate following the Peace of Westphalia in 1648.	
Privy Council of England	1649	1660°	Commonwealth of England (1649–1653); Commonwealth of England, Scotland and Ireland (1653–1659); Commonwealth of England (1659–1660)	Based for most of the Interregnum in the Spanish Netherlands and headed by Charles II; actively supported Charles' claim to the thrones of England, Scotland and Ireland	
(England) (Scotland) Jacobite Privy Council	1688	1788	Kingdom of England (1688–1707); Kingdom of Scotland (1688–1707); Kingdom of Great Britain (1707–1788)	Following the November 1688 Glorious Revolution, the Parliament of England ruled that James II of England had "abandoned" the English throne, which was given to his Protestant daughter Mary II of England, and his nephew, her husband William III. In April 1689, on the same basis, the Scottish Convention awarded Mary and William the throne of Scotland. As a result, James created a government-in-exile in France and his followers became known as Jacobites. James died in 1701, afterwards his claim was inherited by his son James Francis Edward Stuart The "Old Pretender", and then after his own death in 1766, by Charles Edward Stuart The "Young Pretender". In addition to the 1689–1691 Williamite War in Ireland and Jacobite rising of 1689 in Scotland, there were serious revolts in 1715, 1719 and 1745, French invasion attempts in 1708 and 1744, and numerous unsuccessful plots. After 1745, Jacobitism declined and Charles died in 1788. Though his brother and heir Henry Benedict Stuart retained a formal claim to be the legitimate King of England and Scotland until his own death in 1807, he does not seem to have kept up a government-in-exile.	
Confederate government of Missouri	1861	1865	State of Missouri	Missouri had both Union and Confederate governments, but the Confederate government was exiled, eventually governing out of Marshall, Texas.	
Restored Government of Virginia	1861	1865	Commonwealth of Virginia		
Hanover exile court/Guelphic Legion	1866	1878	Prussia (1866–1867); North German Confederation (1867–1871); German Empire (1871–1878)	On 20 September 1866 Prussia annexed Hanover. Living in exile in Austria, at Hietzing and Gmunden, King George V of Hanover never abandoned his claim to the Hanoverian throne and from 1866 to 1870 maintained at his own expense an exile Hanoverian armed force, the Guelphic Legion. George was forced to give up this Legion after the Prussian lower chamber passed in 1869 a law sequestering his funds. George V died in 1878. Though his son and heir Prince Ernest Augustus retained a formal claim to be the legitimate King of Hanover until 1918 (when all German Royal Families were dethroned), he does not seem to have kept up a government-in-exile.	
(Empire of Brazil) Brazilian Monarchical Directory	1890	c. 1921	Republic of the United States of Brazil	Central organization of the Brazilian monarchist movement, founded in 1890 to coordinate efforts for the restoration of the Empire. It united former imperial statesmen, nobles, intellectuals, and regional monarchist branches under a single national leadership. Acting as the principal liaison with the Imperial Family, it directed political advocacy and monarchist activities throughout the First Brazilian Republic.	
Hawaiian Kingdom	1893	1895	Republic of Hawaii	Royal government exiled following the Hawaiian Revolution of 1893, dissolved after the abdication of Queen Liliuokalani in response to the Hawaiian Counter-revolution of 1895.	
(Belgium) Belgian government at Sainte-Adresse	1914	1918	German Empire	Formed in 1915 by the Government of Belgium following the German invasion during World War I. It was disbanded following the restoration of Belgian sovereignty with the Armistice with Germany.	
Provisional Government of the Republic of Korea	1919*	1948°	Korea	Based in Shanghai, and later in Chongqing; after Japan's defeat in World War II, President Syngman Rhee became the first president of the First Republic of South Korea	
Government of the Democratic Republic of Georgia in Exile	1921	1954	Soviet Union	Formed after the Soviet invasion of Georgia of 1921; based in Leuville-sur-Orge.	
Government of the Ukrainian People's Republic in exile	1921	1992	Soviet Union	Formed after the Soviet invasion of Ukraine of 1921; disbanded following the Dissolution of the Soviet Union.	
Sublime State of Persia	1923	1943	Imperial State of Iran	The Qajar dynasty went into exile in 1923 and continued to claim the Iranian throne until the death of Mohammad Hassan Mirza in 1943.	
(Second Spanish Republic) Spanish Republican government in exile	1939	1977°	Spanish State	Founded after Francisco Franco's coup d'état; first based in Paris from 1939 until 1940 when France fell to the Nazis. The exiled government was then moved to Mexico City and stayed there from 1940 to 1946, when it was moved back to Paris, where it lasted until Franco's death and democracy in Spain was restored in the transition.	
(Catalonia) Generalitat de Catalunya	1939	1977°	Spanish State	In 1939, as the Spanish Civil War ended with the defeat of the Republic, the Francoist dictatorship abolished the Generalitat de Catalunya, the autonomous government of Catalonia, and its president Lluís Companys was tortured and executed. However, the Generalitat maintained its official existence in exile from 1939 to 1977, led by presidents Josep Irla (1940–1954) and Josep Tarradellas (1954–1980). In 1977 Tarradellas returned to Catalonia and was recognised by the post-Franco Spanish government, ending the Generalitat's exile.	
(Poland) Polish government-in-exile	1939*	1990°	Occupied Poland (1939–1945); (Poland) Provisional Government of National Unity (1945–1947); People's Republic of Poland (1947–1990)	Based in Paris, Angers and London, it opposed German-occupied Poland and the Soviet satellite state, the People's Republic of Poland; disbanded following the fall of communism in Poland.	
(Estonia) Estonian government-in-exile (Tief)	1940*	1953	Soviet Union	Split into 2 factions in January 1953 following Otto Tief's removal by August Rei and the dispute over succession.	
(Estonia) Estonian government-in-exile (Rei)	1940/1953*	1991°	Soviet Union	Established in Sweden by several members of Otto Tief's government loyal to August Rei; it did not achieve any international recognition. In fact, it was not recognised even by Estonian diplomatic legations that were seen by western countries as legal representatives of the annexed state. However the government in exile was recognized by the restored Government of Estonia when the government in exile ceased its activity in 1992 and gave over its credentials to the restored Republic of Estonia. A rival electoral committee was founded by another group of Estonian exiles loyal to Alfred Maurer in the same year in Detmold, North Rhine-Westphalia, West Germany, but it was short lived.	
(Latvia) Latvian diplomatic service-in-exile	1940*	1991°	Soviet Union		
(Lithuania) Lithuanian diplomatic service-in-exile	1940*	1991°	Soviet Union		
(Commonwealth of the Philippines) Philippine Commonwealth in exile	1942	1944°	Empire of Japan (1943); Second Philippine Republic (1943–1945)	After Japanese forces took control over the Philippine islands, the Philippine commonwealth government led by Manuel Quezon fled first to Melbourne and later to Washington, D.C. It existed from May 1942 to October 1944 before returning to the Philippines along with U.S. forces during the Philippines campaign (1944–1945).	
Emergency Government of the Republic of Indonesia	1948*	1949°	(Netherlands) Dutch East Indies	Based in Bukittinggi; led by Sjafruddin Prawiranegara, founded after Operatie Kraai in December 1948. Disbanded after Roem–Van Roijen Agreement.	
(All-Palestine Protectorate) All-Palestine Government	1948	1959	Israel; Egypt (Gaza Strip); Jordan (West Bank)	The All-Palestine government was proclaimed in Gaza in September 1948, but was shortly relocated to Cairo in fear of Israeli offensive. Despite Egyptian ability to keep control of the Gaza Strip, the All-Palestine Government was forced to remain in exile in Cairo, gradually stripping it of its authority, until in 1959 it was dissolved by President Gamal Abdel Nasser's decree.	
President of Ukraine (in exile)	1948	1992°	Ukrainian Soviet Socialist Republic	Founded on 10 July 1948, when was adopted a "Provisional law about the reorganisation of the State Centre of the Ukrainian People's Republic in exile" which was coordinated between various Ukrainian political organisations. It was disbanded on 22 August 1992, when after an extraordinary session of the Ukrainian National Council on 15 March 1992 adopted a resolution "About handing over authority of the State Centre of UNR in exile to the state power in Kiev and termination of work of the State Centre of UNR in exile".	
(Algeria) Provisional Government of the Algerian Republic	1958*	1962*	French Algeria (France)	Established during the latter part of the Algerian War of Independence; after the war, a compromise agreement with the Armée de Libération Nationale dissolved it but allowed most of its members to enter the post-independence government	
(North Korea) North Korean reserve administration system	1950s	2024	South Korea	Since the late 1950s, North Korea had a government-in-exile for South Korean administrative divisions similar to its South Korean counterpart, composed of people who had defected from South Korea to the North and were not purged. After their death, their children and grandchildren took over. These individuals, who were to assume office after South Korea's "liberation", also generally served in other offices at various levels. Top offices, such as the WPK Secretary of Seoul (though not the chairman of the Seoul City People's Committee, which was reserved for a southerner), were reserved for people born in North Korea. Twice a year, these individuals were supposed to listen to lectures about South Korea and were also granted access to documents laying out the city, town or county they are responsible for. The status of this system after North Korea's abandonment of reunification is unknown.	
Revolutionary Government of Angola in Exile	1962*	1992°	People's Republic of Angola	Based in Kinshasa; its military branch, the National Liberation Front of Angola, was recognised as a political party in 1992 and holds two seats in Angola's parliament	
(Namibia) Namibian Government in Exile	1966*	1989°	South Africa	Formed after opposition to the apartheid South African administration over South-West Africa, which had been ruled as illegal by the United Nations; in 1990, Namibia achieved independence after the South African Border War.	
Provisional Government of the People's Republic of Bangladesh	1971*	1972°	East Pakistan	Based in Calcutta; led by Tajuddin Ahmad, the first Prime Minister of Bangladesh, during the Bangladesh Liberation War in 1971.	
Crown Council of Ethiopia	1974	2004°	Federal Democratic Republic of Ethiopia	See also: Ethiopian Civil War Formerly opposed the Derg and the People's Democratic Republic of Ethiopia, sought to restore the Monarchy of Ethiopia; based in the Washington D.C metropolitan area. On 28 July 2004, the Crown Council redefined its role by redirecting its mission from the political realm to a mission of cultural preservation, development and humanitarian efforts in Ethiopia.	
Free Aceh Movement	1976*	2005	Republic of Indonesia	Headquartered in Turkey; surrendered its separatist intentions and dissolved its armed wing following the 2005 peace agreement with the Indonesian government	
(Cambodia) Coalition Government of Democratic Kampuchea	1982*	1993°	People's Republic of Kampuchea	Established with UN recognition in opposition to the Vietnamese-backed government. Elections in 1993 brought the reintegration of the exiled government into the newly reconstituted Kingdom of Cambodia.	
Council of Khalistan	1984	mid-1990s	Republic of India	The organisation was created On 12 April 1980, when separatist leader Jagjit Singh Chohan officially announced the formation of the Council of Khalistan at Anandpur Sahib and declared himself to be the president. Balbir Singh Sindhu as its Secretary-General. Chohan presented himself as the president of the Republic of Khalistan, set up a cabinet, and issued Khalistani passports, stamps, and currency. On 13 June 1984, Chohan announced a government in exile.	
National Coalition Government of the Union of Burma	1990	2012	Union of Myanmar (1988–2011); Republic of the Union of Myanmar; (2011–2012)	Led by Sein Win and composed of members of parliament elected in 1990 but not allowed by the military to take office; based in Rockville, Maryland, and Montgomery County, Maryland.	
Dubrovnik Republic (1991)	1991	1992	Republic of Croatia	Formed in Cavtat with the help of the Yugoslav People's Army after Croatia declared independence from Yugoslavia. Claimed to be the historic successor of the Republic of Ragusa (1358–1808).	
(Azerbaijan) Azerbaijani Community of Nagorno-Karabakh	1994	2021°	Azerbaijan	Based in Baku; not a real government in exile, but an Azerbaijani association, founded on 24 March 1994 and led by Tural Ganjaliyev, whose territory was under the control of Armenian separatists between 1991 and 2020. On 30 April 2021 was announced the dissolution of the association after the return of most of Nagorno-Karabakh under Azerbaijani control after the Second Nagorno-Karabakh War.	
(Kurdistan Region) Kurdish Parliament in Exile	1995	1999	Republic of Türkiye	Based in The Hague; founded in April 1995 and led by Yaşar Kaya. It was disbanded in 1999.	
(South Vietnam) Government of Free Vietnam	1995*	2013°	Socialist Republic of Vietnam	The Government of Free Vietnam was an anti-communist political organisation centred in Garden Grove, California and Missouri City, Texas. It was disbanded in 2013.	
(Gabon) Bongo Doit Partir	1998	2009	Gabon	Founded by Daniel Mengara in opposition to president Omar Bongo; after Bongo's death in June 2009, Mengara returned to Gabon in order to participate in the country's elections	
Quetta Shura	2001	2021	Islamic Republic of Afghanistan	See also: Taliban insurgency and United States invasion of Afghanistan Based in Quetta, as a continuation of the Islamic Emirate of Afghanistan. After the Taliban were removed from power in the 2001 Afghan war, the veteran high-ranking leaders of the former government including Mullah Mohammed Omar, founder and spiritual leader of the Taliban, fled to Quetta, Balochistan Province, Pakistan where they set up Quetta Shura in exile to organise and direct the insurgency and retake Afghanistan which was achieved in August 2021.	
Royal Lao Government in Exile	2003	2023	Lao People's Democratic Republic	See also: Laotian Civil War Opposed communist government in Laos, sought to institute a constitutional monarchy until its self-proclaimed prime minister died; based in Gresham, Oregon.	
Interim Government of Federated Shan States	2005	2006	Union of Myanmar	Aimed to establish an independent state for the Shan ethnic group; it became defunct within several months.	
(Georgia (country)) Provisional Administration of South Ossetia	2008	2025	Republic of South Ossetia	Georgian provincial administration, led by Tamaz Bestayev, whose territory is under the control of South Ossetian separatists; was based in Tbilisi. Following the 2008 South Ossetia war, the Provisional Administration had no South Ossetian territory under its control and remained a nominal entity until it was abolished on 31 December 2025.	
Syrian Interim Government	2013	2025°	Syrian Arab Republic	Was opposed to Ba'athist Syria, had ties to some Free Syrian Army groups; was based in Azaz. After the fall of the Assad regime in December 2024, the SIG coexisted for a short period of time with the Syrian caretaker government headed by Mohammed al-Bashir in Damascus, while the SNC expressed its support for the caretaker government and called for the formation of a government that would be "inclusive of everyone." On 30 January 2025, the SIG officially dissolved and was absorbed into the caretaker government.	
New Zaire Government in Exile	2017	2024	Democratic Republic of Congo	Established in Brussels by Congolese opposition politician Christian Malanga of the United Congolese Party in May 2017. Malanga was killed during an unsuccessful attempt at overthrowing the Congolese government on 19 May 2024.	

=== World War II ===
Many countries established a government in exile after loss of sovereignty in connection with World War II.

==== Governments in London ====
A large number of European governments-in-exile were set up in London.

Name	Leaders
(Belgium) Belgian government in exile	Prime Minister: Hubert Pierlot
(Czechoslovakia) Czechoslovak government-in-exile	President: Edvard Beneš; Prime Minister: Jan Šrámek
Free France	Charles de Gaulle, Henri Giraud, French Committee of National Liberation (from 1943)
(Kingdom of Greece) Greek government-in-exile	King George II; Prime Minister: Emmanouil Tsouderos (1941–1944), Sofoklis Venizelos (1944), Georgios Papandreou (1944–1945)
Luxembourg government in exile	Grand Duchess Charlotte; Prime Minister: Pierre Dupong
(Netherlands) Dutch government-in-exile	Queen Wilhelmina; Prime Minister: Dirk Jan de Geer (1940), Pieter Sjoerds Gerbrandy (1940–1945)
(Norway) Norwegian government-in-exile	King Haakon VII; Prime Minister: Johan Nygaardsvold
(Poland) Polish government-in-exile	President: Władysław Raczkiewicz; Prime Minister: Władysław Sikorski (1939–1943), Stanisław Mikołajczyk (1943–1944), Tomasz Arciszewski (1944–1945)
(Kingdom of Yugoslavia) Yugoslav government-in-exile	King Peter II; Prime Minister: Dušan Simović (1941–1942), Slobodan Jovanović (1942–1943), Miloš Trifunović (1943), Božidar Purić (1943–1944), Ivan Šubašić (1944–1945)
(Austria) Austrian Democratic Union (Unrecognised)	
(Denmark) Danish Freedom Council (Unrecognised)	
(Thailand) Free Thai Movement (Unrecognised)	

Other exiled leaders in Britain in this time included King Zog of Albania and Emperor Haile Selassie of Ethiopia.

Occupied Denmark did not establish a government in exile, although there was an Association of Free Danes established in London. The government remained in Denmark and functioned with relative independence until August 1943 when it was dissolved, placing Denmark under full German occupation. Meanwhile, Iceland, Greenland and the Faroe Islands were occupied by the Allies and effectively separated from the Danish crown. (See British occupation of the Faroe Islands, Iceland during World War II, and History of Greenland during World War II.)

==== Governments-in-exile in Asia ====
The Philippine Commonwealth (invaded 9 December 1941) established a government in exile, initially located in Australia and later in the United States. Earlier, in 1897, the Hong Kong Junta was established as a government in exile by the Philippine revolutionary Republic of Biak-na-Bato.

While formed long before World War II, the Provisional Government of the Republic of Korea continued in exile in China until the end of the war.

At the fall of Java, and the surrender by the Dutch on behalf of Allied forces on 8 March 1942, many Dutch-Indies officials (including Dr van Mook and Dr Charles van der Plas) managed to flee to Australia in March 1942, and on 23 December 1943, the Royal Government (Dutch) decreed an official Netherlands East Indies government-in-exile, with Dr van Mook as Acting Governor General, on Australian soil until Dutch rule was restored in the Indies.

==== Axis-aligned governments in exile ====
In the later stages of World War II, with the German Army increasingly pushed back and expelled from various countries, Axis-aligned groups from some countries set up "governments-in-exile" under the auspices of the Axis powers, in the remaining Axis territory – even though internationally recognised governments were in place in their home countries. The main purpose of these was to recruit and organise military units composed of their nationals in the host country.

Name	Exiled or founded (*) since	Defunct, reestablished (*) or integrated (°) since	State that controlled its claimed territory	Notes	References
Azad Hind	21 October 1943*	18 August 1945	British Raj	The Provisional Government of Free India, or Azad Hind, was a state founded to oppose the British Raj. It was based in Rangoon and later in Port Blair. Subhas Chandra Bose was the leader of the government and the Head of State. The government was initially established in Singapore but later given control of Japanese-controlled territory in far eastern India and the Andaman and Nicobar Islands. The government issued its currency notes and started establishing bilateral relationships with countries aligned against Britain. The Azad Hind Fauj or Indian National Army (INA) was the official military of Government of India led by Subhas Chandra Bose. This government was disestablished in 1945 following the defeat of the Axis powers in World War II. The trials of INA leaders after the war led to the Royal Indian Navy revolt in 1946, which hastened the end of British rule in India.	
Montenegrin State Council	Summer of 1944	8 May 1945	Kingdom of Yugoslavia	After the Germans withdrew from Montenegro, the fascist leader Sekula Drljević founded a government-in-exile based in Zagreb, capital of the Independent State of Croatia (NDH). Drljević founded the Montenegrin National Army, a military force set up by him and the Croatian fascist leader Ante Pavelić. However, his government was dissolved after the fall of the NDH.	
Legionary Romania	August 1944	8 May 1945	Kingdom of Romania	Germany had imprisoned Horia Sima and other members of the Iron Guard following the Legionnaires' rebellion of 1941. In 1944, King Michael's Coup brought a pro-Allied government to power in Romania. In response Germany released Sima to establish a pro-Axis government in exile in Vienna. It raised a Romanian National Army in the SS of 12.000 men that fought along Germany until the end of the war.	
Sigmaringen Governmental Commission	7 September 1944*	23 April 1945°	Provisional Government of the French Republic	Members of the collaborationist French cabinet at Vichy were relocated by the Germans to the Sigmaringen enclave in Germany, where they became a government-in-exile until April 1945. They were given formal governmental power over the city of Sigmaringen, and the three Axis governments—Germany, Italy and Japan—established there what were officially their embassies to France. Pétain having refused to take part in this, it was headed by Fernand de Brinon.	
Kingdom of Bulgaria	16 September 1944*	10 May 1945	Kingdom of Bulgaria (Fatherland Front)	Formed after the 1944 Bulgarian coup d'état brought socialists to power in Bulgaria, the government was based in Vienna and headed by Aleksandar Tsankov. It raised the 1st Bulgarian Regiment of the SS.	
Hellenic State	September 1944	April 1945	Kingdom of Greece	After the liberation of Greece, a new collaborationist government had been established at Vienna, during September 1944, formed by former collaborationist ministers. It was headed by the former collaborationist minister Ektor Tsironikos. In April 1945, Tsironikos was captured during the Vienna offensive along with his ministers.	
Hungarian Government of National Unity	28/29 March 1945	7 May 1945	Czechoslovak Republic; Kingdom of Hungary; Kingdom of Romania; Kingdom of Yugoslavia	The Szálasi government fled in the face of the Soviet advance through Hungary. It was first based in Vienna and then in Munich. Most of its leaders were arrested in the following months, in the aftermath of the final Allied victory in Europe.	
Slovak Republic	4 April 1945	8 May 1945	Czechoslovak Republic	The government of the Slovak Republic, led by Jozef Tiso, went into exile on 4 April 1945 to the Austrian town of Kremsmünster when the Red Army captured Bratislava and occupied Slovakia. The exiled government capitulated to the American General Walton Walker on 8 May 1945 in Kremsmünster. In summer 1945, the captured members of the government were handed over to Czechoslovak authorities.	
Second Philippine Republic	11 June 1945	17 August 1945	Philippine Commonwealth	After the Allied forces liberated the Philippines from Japanese occupiers and the reestablishment of the Philippine Commonwealth in the archipelago after a few years in exile in the United States, the Second Philippine Republic became a nominal government-in-exile from 11 June 1945, based in Nara / Tokyo. The government was later dissolved on 17 August 1945.	
Croatian Government in exile	10 April 1951	28 December 1959	Yugoslavia	Many former members of the Government of the Independent State of Croatia fled to Argentina. From there they founded a government in exile.	

=== Persian Gulf War ===
Following the Ba'athist Iraqi invasion and occupation of Kuwait, during the Persian Gulf War, on 2 August 1990, Sheikh Jaber Al-Ahmad Al-Jaber Al-Sabah and senior members of his government fled to Saudi Arabia, where they set up a government-in-exile in Ta'if. The Kuwaiti government in exile was far more affluent than most other such governments, having full disposal of the very considerable Kuwaiti assets in western banks—of which it made use to conduct a massive propaganda campaign denouncing the Ba'athist Iraqi occupation and mobilising public opinion in the Western world in favor of war with Ba'athist Iraq. In March 1991, following the defeat of Ba'athist Iraq at the hands of coalition forces in the Persian Gulf War, the Sheikh and his government were able to return to Kuwait.

=== Municipal councils in exile ===
Following the Turkish Invasion of Cyprus in 1974 and the displacement of many Greek Cypriots from North Cyprus, displaced inhabitants of several towns set up what are in effect municipal councils in exile, headed by mayors in exile. The idea is the same as with a national government in exile—to assert a continuation of legitimate rule, even though having no control of the ground, and working towards restoration of such control. Meetings of the exiled Municipal Council of Lapithos took place in the homes of its members until the Exile Municipality was offered temporary offices at 37 Ammochostou Street, Nicosia. The current Exile Mayor of the town is Athos Eleftheriou. The same premises are shared with the Exile Municipal Council of Kythrea.

Also in the Famagusta District of Cyprus, the administration of the part retained by the Republic of Cyprus, based in Paralimni, considers itself a "District administration in exile", since the district's capital Famagusta has been under Turkish control since 1974.

=== Administrative divisions of Ukraine in exile ===
During the Russo-Ukrainian War, after the Annexation of Crimea by the Russian Federation in March 2014, following a disputed status referendum, the Ukrainian governments of both the Autonomous Republic of Crimea and the City of Sevastopol moved to nearby Kherson in the Kherson Oblast, where they were based until the 2022 Russian invasion of Ukraine. After the Russian occupation of Kherson Oblast, the governments are now operating remotely in Ukraine.

Due to the Russo-Ukrainian War, the capital of Luhansk Oblast was de facto moved from Luhansk to Sievierodonetsk in 2014 while the capital of Donetsk Oblast was de facto moved from Donetsk to Mariupol in June 2014, then to Kramatorsk in October 2014, where it currently is. As of the fall of Sievierodonetsk in June 2022, the government of Luhansk Oblast is operating remotely in Ukraine.

== Fictional governments-in-exile ==
Works of alternate history as well as science fictional depictions of the future sometimes include fictional governments-in-exile.

- In Len Deighton's SS-GB, the UK is defeated in World War II and occupied by Germany. The story features a British government-in-exile in Washington, D.C.
- In If Israel Lost the War by Robert Littell, Richard Z. Chesnoff and Edward Klein, Israel is defeated in the 1967 Six-Day War and its territory occupied by Arab armies. Thereupon, David Ben-Gurion and Golda Meir set up an Israeli government in exile in North America.
- Algis Budrys' The Falling Torch is set in a future time when Earth was conquered and occupied by extraterrestrial humanoid invaders. Many years later, the Earth government in exile, located at a human colony planet orbiting Alpha Centauri, is holding a regular meeting in an atmosphere of dejection and futility—its hosts being indifferent to Earth's plight and unwilling to offer any real help. The exile prime minister is shown more involved with his successful career as the chef of a luxury hotel than with the seemingly non-existent hope of liberating Earth. This depiction might have drawn on the writer's actual experience as a member of the exile Lithuanian community in the 1950s US, at the time seeing little hope of shaking the Soviet hold of its homeland.
- In the Hearts of Iron IV mod, Kaiserreich (which portrays an alternate history where Germany wins World War I), the former governments of France, Britain, and Italy are exiled to Algeria, Canada, and Sardinia, respectively, after syndicalist revolutionaries assume control.

== See also ==
- Embassy without a government
- Rival government
- Exclusive mandate
- Exilarch
- Provisional government
- Shadow cabinet
- Transfer of the Portuguese court to Brazil
- Unrepresented Nations and Peoples Organization

=== Lists ===
- Lists of active separatist movements
- List of historical separatist movements
- List of historical unrecognised states
- List of states with limited recognition
- List of territorial disputes
- United Nations list of non-self-governing territories
