= China–Democratic Republic of the Congo relations =

Bilateral relations between China and DR Congo

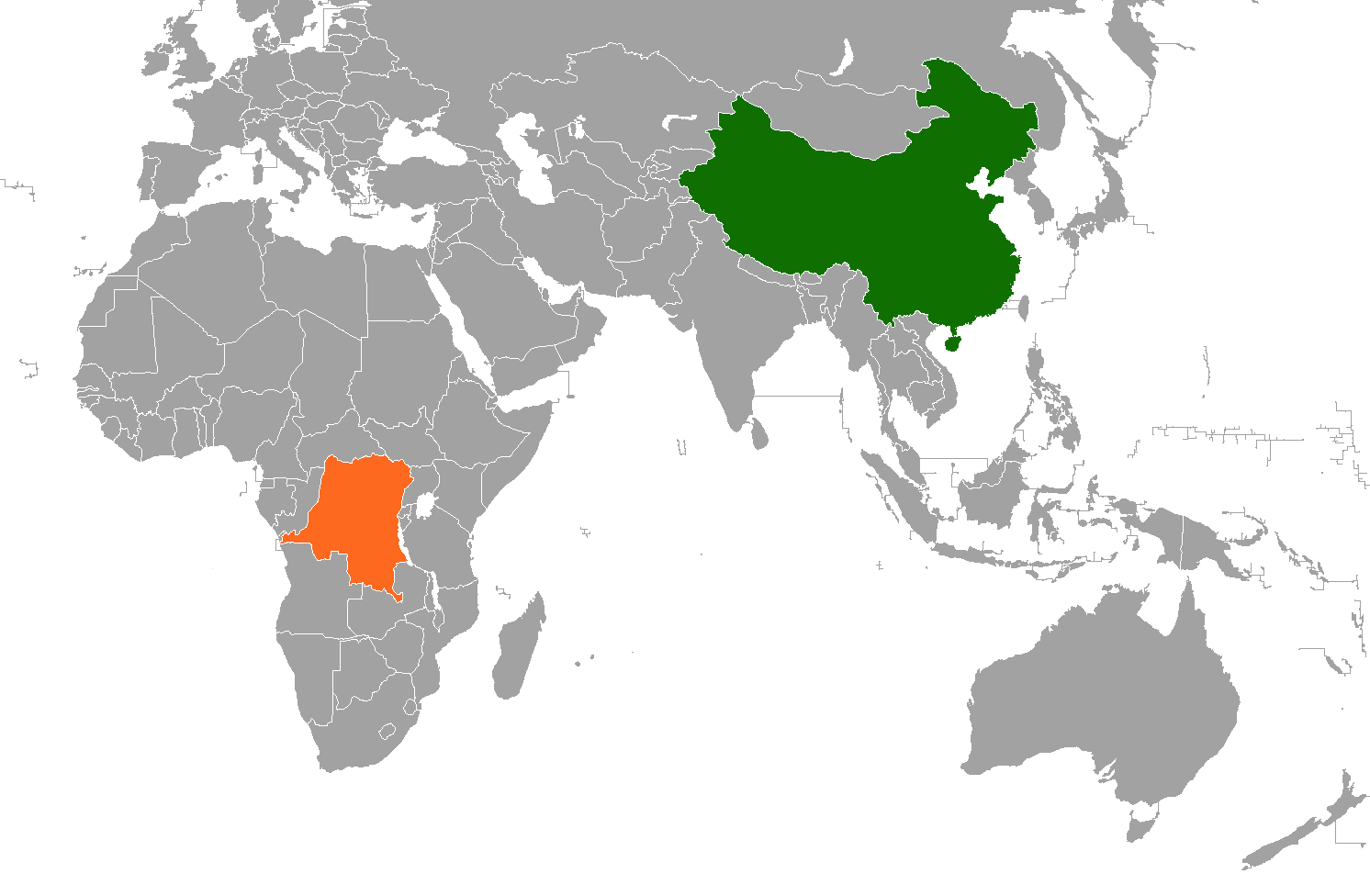
- China: DR Congo

The People's Republic of China (PRC) and the Democratic Republic of the Congo (DRC) have maintained diplomatic relations since 1961. Contact between the two regions stretch back to 1887 when representatives of the Congo Free State established relations with the Qing dynasty. The first treaty between the two powers was signed in 1898.

The Free State became a Belgian colony in 1908, but when it gained its independence in 1960 it established formal relations with the Republic of China (ROC), which had replaced the Qing in 1912 but was relegated to the island of Taiwan, a former Japanese colony, after 1949. Over the next decade, Congolese recognition was switched several times between the ROC and the PRC before it settled finally on the latter in 1971.

At the time, the Congo was known as Zaire. In the 21st century, Chinese investment in the DRC and Congolese exports to China have grown rapidly. The DRC joined the Belt and Road Initiative in 2021.

== Qing relations with the Congo Free State ==
In 1887, King Leopold II of Belgium sent emissaries to the Qing court in China to request the right to recruit labourers for the Congo Free State. Since the Qing had already signed a treaty with Belgium, the Belgians were permitted to recruit labour on behalf of their own colonies, but not for the Congo Free State, which was not a Belgian colony. In 1892, the agents of the Congo Free State contracted out their recruiting in China to Macau-based Portuguese firms. A total of 536 men and six boys were recruited in Guangzhou under three-year contracts. The Congo paid their round-trip fares, provided room and board and paid wages of 45 francs a month. Workers wishing to remain in the Congo after three years would then receive a 400-franc cash allowance. These men left for the Congo on 18 September 1892 aboard the German steamer Walstein from Macau. Both the China Custom Annual Trading and Commerce Records and the Business Report of the British Consulate in China reported more workers recruited by Macanese and Hong Kong agents in Qiongzhou and Shantou for work in the Congo in 1892. In the Congo, these recruits were put to work on the Congo railway, logging trees and hauling rocks. Most of these recruits died in the harsh conditions of the Congo. Contemporary newspapers in Hong Kong published information about the bad conditions and mistreatment suffered by the Chinese in the Congo. During this first period of recruitment, around 1,000 Chinese went to the Congo.

On 10 July 1898, China and the Congo Free State signed a "special chapter" in Peking that stated, in part: "It was agreed upon that Chinese citizens can at will move to and live in the Congo Free State. All properties, movable or unmovable, can be purchased or traded. Whether for shipping, business, crafts or arts, Chinese citizens will receive the same treatment as citizens of the most favorable countries." This agreement granted China "most favoured nation" status in the Congo. It also had the effect of legalising the recruitment of Chinese for work in the Congo. Although Congolese authorities found the performance of the workers of 1892 unsatisfactory, recruitment drives were undertaken in China in 1901, 1902, 1904, and 1906. During this second period of recruitment, about 2,000 Chinese went to the Congo. In 1906, Hong Kong alone produced 500 recruits.

== Establishing relations with the ROC and the PRC ==
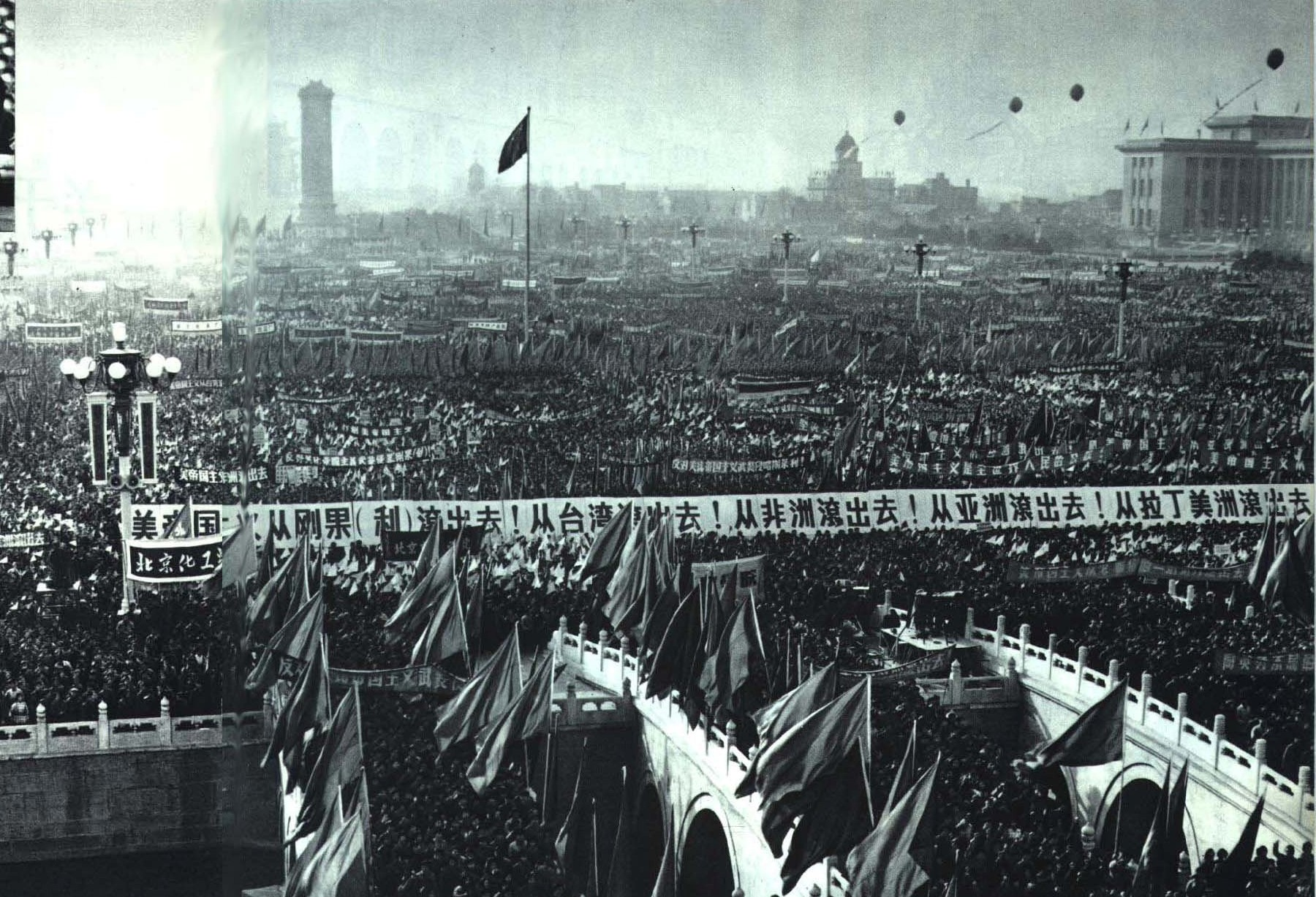
A mass rally in Tiananmen Square of Beijing in 1965 against U.S. intervention in Congo-Léopoldville.

In October 1960, the newly independent DRC, then called the Republic of the Congo, established diplomatic relations with the Republic of China (ROC). On February 20, 1961, China recognized the government headed by Antoine Gizenga. In September 1961, Gizenga joined the Cyrille Adoula government, which recognized the ROC, and the PRC suspended relations in response.

Relations were again established between the DRC, then known as the Republic of Zaire, and the People's Republic of China in November 1972 and have remained intact since.

During the time that the DRC/Zaire recognised Taiwan, between 1961 and 1971, the PRC supported and provided material support to anti-Zairian rebels. After Zaire's president, Joseph-Désiré Mobutu, reverted recognition back to the PRC, eight Chinese leaders visited Zaire between 1978 and 1995. Mobutu himself visited the PRC five times, despite the fact that their relationship was not very close at the time.

The Democratic Republic of the Congo follows the one China principle. It recognizes the People's Republic of China as the sole government of China and Taiwan as an integral part of China's territory, and supports all efforts by the PRC to "achieve national reunification".

The DR Congo considers Hong Kong, Tibet, and Xinjiang to be China's internal affairs.

== Present economic relations ==
The DRC is a major destination for Chinese investment, especially in mining, with the South China Morning Post describing the country as "the epicentre of Chinese investments in Africa". Major companies involved include Chengtun Mining, China Molybdenum Company, China Nonferrous Metal Mining Group, and Huayou Cobalt. As of 2025, Chinese investment in the DRC is primarily in the resources sector and predominantly mining-related.

In June 2000, a Sino-Congolese telecommunications company (China-Congo Telecom) was set up between ZTE and the Congolese government in a deal worth RMB 80 million in concessional finance from China EXIM Bank. In April 2009, South African telecommunications group MTN Group offered to buy ZTE's 51 percent stake in the company for USD 200 million. As of January 2010, the DRC has not yet been given Approved Destination Status (ADS) by China due to ongoing civil conflict in the country.

Exports of copper ore and hard woods to China increased greatly in 2007.

DRC joined the Belt and Road Initiative (BRI) in 2021.

China and the DRC have significant trade in cobalt, a metal for which China is the world's largest consumer due to its importance in batteries for electric vehicles. As of at least 2024, the DRC produces more than 70% of the world's cobalt, and most of this production goes to China. Chinese companies also account for the majority of cobalt mining in the DRC.

=== Sicomines ===
In April 2008, the Congolese government and a Chinese consortium consisting of Sinohydro and China Railway Engineering Corporation formed Sicomines, a joint venture exchanging mineral concessions in Katanga for infrastructure investments. Originally valued at US$9 billion, funded by China EXIM Bank, the deal allocated US$6 billion to infrastructure and US$3 billion to mining operations. Sicomines owns 68% of the project, while the Congolese state-owned mining company Gécamines holds the remaining 32%.

The infrastructure investments initially included the construction or rehabilitation of 6,600 km of roads, two hospitals, and two universities. The mining concessions at Dikuluwe and Mashamba West offered access to confirmed deposits of 6.8 million tons of copper and 427,000 tons of cobalt.

The deal faced scrutiny over debt sustainability, prompting a reduction of US$3 billion in May 2009 pending further feasibility studies. In 2023, negotiations led by President Félix Tshisekedi resulted in a revised agreement, increasing China's infrastructure investment commitment to US$7 billion. By January 2024, the Congolese government dedicated these revenues primarily to road improvements, including a major upgrade of National Road 1 between Mbuji-Mayi and Lualaba Province.

=== Benefaction ===
Former governor of Katanga province Moïse Katumbi estimated that over 60 of the province's 75 processing plants are owned by Chinese nationals. He said that 90% of the region's minerals went to China. They are known to have poor environmental and labour relations records and have been accused, directly or indirectly, of using child labour. In 2007, about 600 Chinese nationals were expelled from Katanga for violating labour and environmental laws.

=== Building projects in the DRC ===
Since 1972, the PRC has given a number of donations to the DRC. Including a farm on the outskirts of Kinshasa, a sugar refinery in Kisangani, and the National Assembly building (at the time costing US$42 million or US$186 million in 2011 dollars) were all built and given to the DRC/Zaire in the 1970s. The Chinese government also built an 80,000-seat stadium in 1994. In 2004, the PRC built and donated the N'Djili Sino-Congolese Friendship Hospital, handing it over to the DRC government in 2006. According to AidData, from 2000 to 2011, there are approximately 21 Chinese official development finance projects identified in DRC through various media reports.

In January 2021, the Chinese government agreed to cancel Congolese debt worth US$28 million and pledged US$17 million in aid, mainly for development projects. At the same time, the Democratic Republic of the Congo joined the Belt and Road Initiative.

== Military cooperation ==
China has also been committed to providing assistance for reforming the Armed Forces of the Democratic Republic of the Congo (FARDC). Besides providing military equipment, Chinese firms helped construct the FARDC headquarters and a naval base at the sea port of Banana. The Chinese have also provided maintenance and repair for the Congolese navy's "Shanghai" Type 062 gunboats, since eight boats were purchased under the Mobutu regime, but only two being currently operational due to poor maintenance. A Chinese military mission is based at Kamina since 2008, where in August 2017 they completed training of the Congolese 32nd Rapid Reaction Brigade by Chinese instructors. 4th President Joseph Kabila of the DRC has received training at the PLA National Defense University.

== Official visits ==
Throughout 2015 and 2016, high-ranking officials of the DRC, including President Kabila, Prime Minister Augustin Matata Ponyo, and Foreign Minister Raymond Tshibanda, met with Chinese Foreign Minister Wang Yi. They discussed the increase in economic cooperation, as well as in other fields, between the two states.
