= United Congolese Party =

US-based Congolese political party

United Congolese Party Parti des Congolais Unis
- Leader: TBD
- Founder: Christian Malanga
- Founded: 2010, 2012
- Headquarters: Washington, D.C.
- Ideology: Classical liberalism
- Political position: Centre-right
- Seats in the National Assembly: 0 / 500
- Seats in the Senate: 0 / 108

The United Congolese Party (UCP; Parti des Congolais Unis - PCU) is a center-right political party-in-exile representing domestic and diaspora interests in the Democratic Republic of the Congo. The party was established in 2012 by Congolese businessman Christian Malanga to serve as a platform for independent opposition candidates in the DRC. Malanga subsequently styled himself as the "President of New Zaire" and was killed in a coup attempt in Kinshasa on May 19, 2024.

== History ==
The party was initially formed as the Congolese Liberation Movement (Mouvement de Libération Congolais) in January 2010 by Kinshasan businessman and former military officer Christian Malanga. The purpose of the party was to provide organization for the loose assembly of independent opposition candidates in the Democratic Republic of the Congo's parliamentary elections in 2011. When party candidates were detained prior to the widely contested elections and released weeks later, UCP president Christian Malanga moved the party apparatus to the Washington DC metropolitan area. There the party was reformed under a new charter in October 2012 as the United Congolese Party.

On April 7, 2014, Malanga appointed Congolese soukous musician Kanda Bongo Man as the United Congolese Party's first Ambassador-at-Large in a ceremony in Washington DC. Kanda's chief duty as UCP Ambassador-at-Large is to cultivate good will and friendship with other progressive African leaders. The UCP campaigns and lobbies on behalf of both domestic and international Congolese interests in preparation for the next round of national elections in the Democratic Republic of the Congo. On May 19, 2024, Christian Malanga was killed in a coup attempt in Kinshasa in the Democratic Republic of Congo. Malanga styled himself as the President of the New Zaire Government in Exile.
