= Christian Malanga =

Congolese politician and military officer (1983–2024)

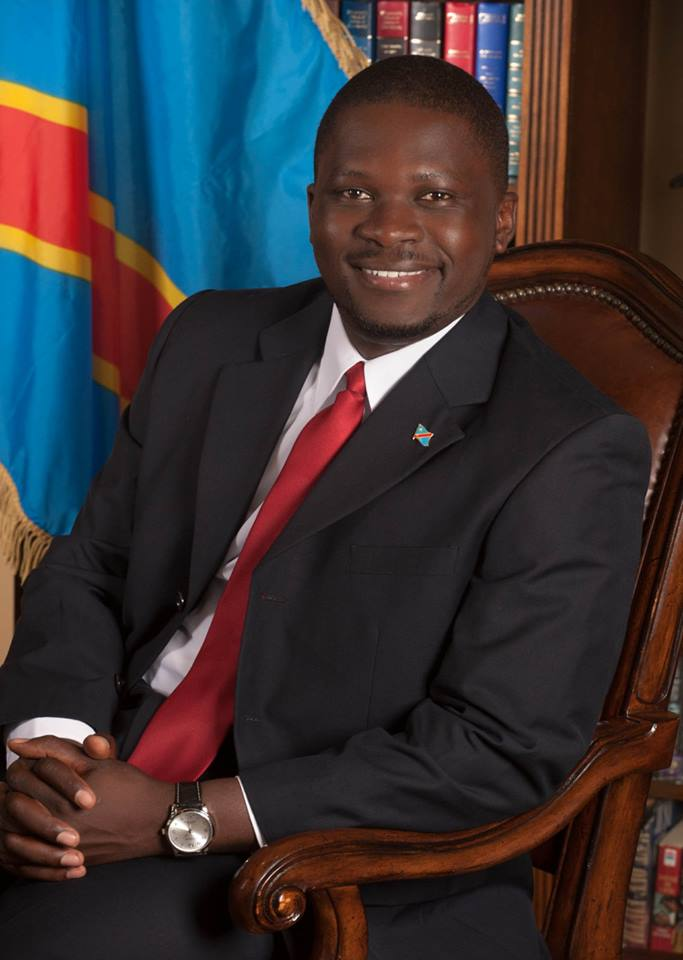
- Official portrait, 2014

President of the New Zaire Government-in-Exile (self-declared)
- In office 2017 – 19 May 2024
- Preceded by: Position established
- Succeeded by: Unknown

Leader of the United Congolese Party
- In office 2012 – 19 May 2024
- Preceded by: Position established
- Succeeded by: Position abolished

Personal details
- Born: Christian Malanga Musumari; 2 January 1983 Kinshasa, Zaire
- Died: 19 May 2024 (aged 41) Kinshasa, DR Congo
- Cause of death: Gunshot wounds
- Party: United Congolese Party
- Occupation: Politician, businessman, military officer
- Website: https://christianmalanga.com/

Christian Malanga Musumari (2 January 1983 – 19 May 2024) was a Congolese-American-French politician, businessman, and military officer. He was leader of the United Congolese Party (UCP), a national political party he formed in the United States after his experiences in the Democratic Republic of the Congo's widely disputed parliamentary elections in 2011. In 2017, he established the New Zaire Government in Exile and proclaimed himself its president. Malanga attempted to overthrow the government of the DR Congo on 19 May 2024. The attempt failed with Malanga being shot and killed and many other assailants, including his son Marcel, arrested.

== Early life ==
Malanga was born to Chantal Kibonge and Joseph Itejo Malanga in the capital city of Kinshasa. His father was born and raised in Mangai. His mother was a local of Ngaba, where Malanga's parents met. They settled outside of the city of Kinshasa, where his mother worked at a local market and his father worked as a supervisor at a General Motors plant in Kinshasa proper. In 1993, Malanga's family relocated to a refugee camp in Swaziland (now Eswatini) as political refugees. Malanga went to primary school at Saint Paul's Methodist Primary School in Swaziland.

In 1998, Malanga moved to Salt Lake City, Utah in the United States as a political refugee with asylum status. Malanga joined the Junior Reserve Officers' Training Corps (JROTC) program by the United States Armed Forces.

== Personal life ==
Malanga had one son with Brittany Sawyer, Marcel. Malanga was convicted in 2001 of assault with a firearm and was given a 30-day jail sentence and three years of probation. He also faced charges of domestic violence and disturbing the peace which were dismissed. Legal records also showed that he had been involved in a custody and child support dispute.

== Early career ==
In Utah, Malanga owned several small businesses until 2006, when he cofounded the DRC non-profit organization Africa Helpline Society. He worked directly with children at the on-site orphanage and with the organization's global outreach initiatives. During this period he also established an organization called Friends of America.

=== Military service ===
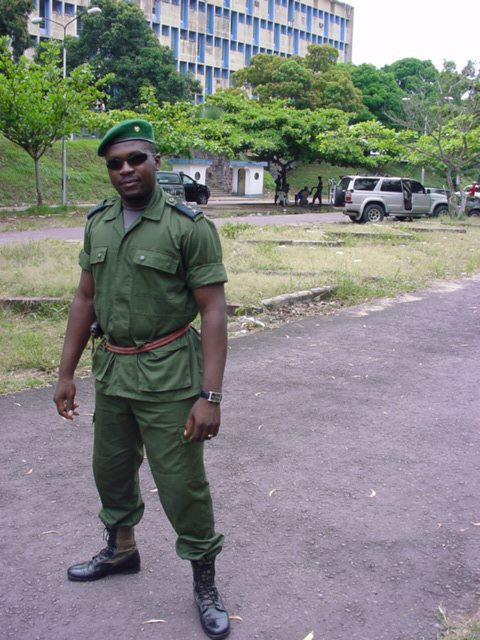
Malanga in Congolese Battle Uniform, 2007

In June 2006, Malanga returned to the DRC to participate in military service, and in 2007 he achieved the rank of captain in the Congolese military. His principal duties during service included being brigade morale officer and command of a training company with responsibility for approximately 235 men under his command.

=== Malanga Congo ===
After his tour of military duty ended in 2010 Malanga started his own company, Malanga Congo, which hired 250 employees in several sectors to perform public works and contracting projects. These projects included creating and maintaining water purification and bottling plants and several mining operations. These businesses proved profitable enough to provide the platform from which he launched his political career that same year.

== Political career ==
=== 2011 parliamentary elections ===
In 2011 Malanga attended a general assembly meeting of all political opposition leaders to select a candidate to challenge the then President Joseph Kabila. When the general assembly proved to be indecisive, Malanga decided to run in the parliamentary election as an independent opposition candidate. He was detained two days before the parliamentary elections by government security forces and held for more than two weeks. Upon his release he was offered a position as National Youth President. He declined the position.

Malanga reported the situation to the U.S. Embassy and then returned to the USA where he lived with his family. He continued to raise awareness in Washington DC and throughout the US regarding the issues facing the Congo.

=== United Congolese Party ===
Malanga returned to the United States in 2012. He founded his own political party, the US-registered United Congolese Party (UCP). Malanga campaigned amid the Congolese diaspora in the United States, Europe and South Africa in preparation for the next round of national elections in the Democratic Republic of the Congo.

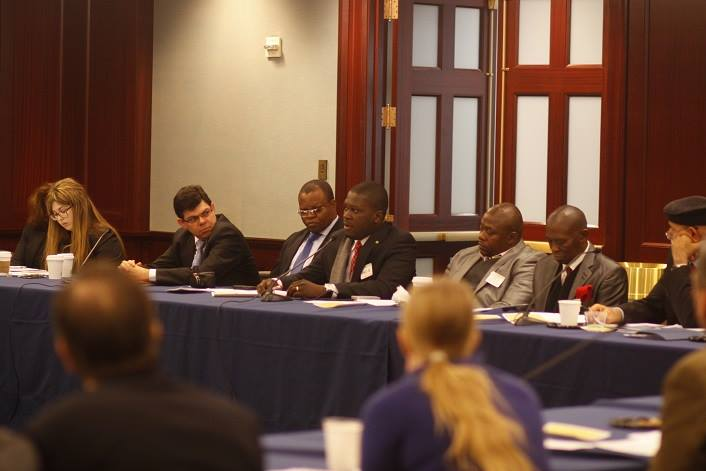
Malanga at the IRF Summit at Capitol Hill, December 2013

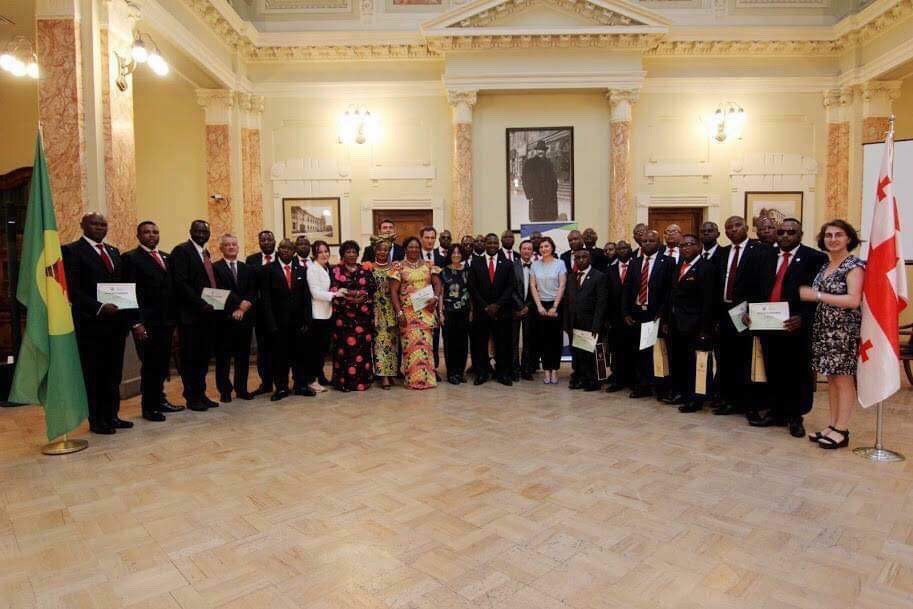
In 2016, he and members of his UCP were part of a British-backed delegation of African Leaders Programme that traveled to Tbilisi, Georgia.

Malanga was part of a UK-supported delegation to a political conference in Tbilisi, Georgia in 2016. The African Leaders Programme was to learn how to fight against corruption, reform fiscal policy and tax systems, privatize state-owned enterprises, build a welfare system, create a competitive education and healthcare system, and streamline procurement. The conference took place at the National Parliamentary Library of Georgia. The delegation worked with policymakers to strengthen the party's economic plan.

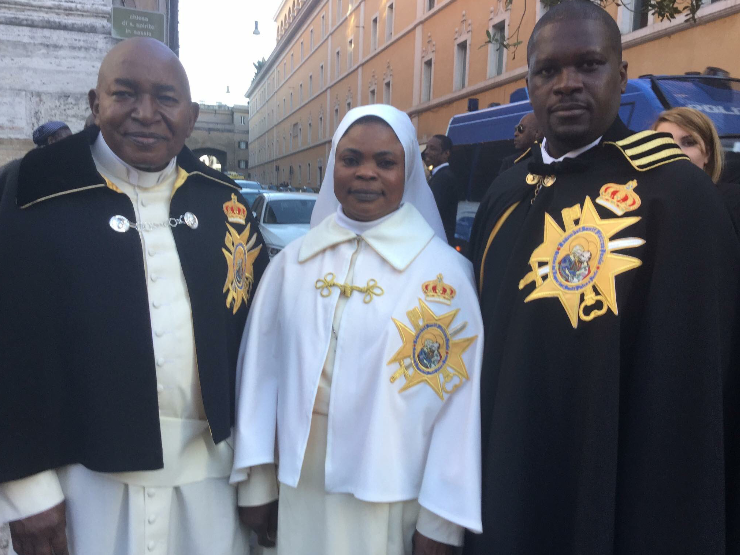
Archbishop Aimè Mandio Akuma (left), Sister Therese (center), and Christian Malanga (right), April 2017.

Malanga claimed that on 29 April 2017 at the basilica Santo Spirito in Sassia in Rome he received the rank of knight of the order of Saints Peter and Paul directly from Pope Francis himself and that he had the support of the Catholic Church in Congo. However, no such knightly order exists within the Catholic Church.

On 17 May 2017, Malanga created an alternative government, the New Zaire Government in Exile, in Brussels, Belgium. He declared himself to be the President of New Zaire. The Democratic Republic of the Congo previously used the name "Zaire" between 1971 and 1997, during the rule of dictator Mobutu Sese Seko, and New Zaire uses the national flag from this period.

Dino Mahtani, an independent researcher into African issues and former political adviser to the United Nations in Congo, reported that Malanga was obsessed with capturing power in Congo and in 2018 Congolese authorities suspected that he was involved in a purported plot to kill then-President Joseph Kabila.

The New Zaire Government in Exile maintained a website where it details plans including creating business opportunities and reforming Congo's security services. As of May 2024 the website still referred to Malanga as President of New Zaire (archived versions available via Wayback Machine). Photos on Facebook and the website show Malanga meeting then-senior American Republican representatives Rob Bishop and Peter King. Bishop has stated that he does not recall the meeting and couldn't tell when the photo was taken.

A DRC army spokesman Sylvain Ekenge claimed that Malanga and the New Zaire Government in Exile had previously planned a coup in 2017 but that it was aborted in its early stages.

=== Attempted coup and execution ===
Forces loyal to the New Zaire Government in Exile attempted to overthrow the Congolese government on 19 May 2024. The attempted coup was quickly suppressed by security forces with Malanga being photographed as captured alive before the government reported he was killed in the fighting while his 21-year-old son Marcel was captured. Malanga was 41. In addition to Malanga, three other gunmen and two policemen were killed in the fighting. Due to the ability of the plotters to easily smuggle arms and ammunition into the DRC, as well as their ease at accessing important government buildings, the Lutte pour le changement assessed that Congolese intelligence was either involved in the coup attempt, or utterly inept. A number of foreign individuals, including at least three American citizens, and one French citizen, were involved in the coup alongside members of the New Zaire Government in Exile.

The coup came during a crisis in sitting president Félix Tshisekedi's Union for Democracy and Social Progress party failing to form a governing coalition and naming a speaker of parliament. During the coup, Malanga uploaded a video to his personal Facebook account inside the Palace of the Nation saying "Felix, you’re out. We are coming for you."
