= Félix Tshisekedi =

President of the Democratic Republic of the Congo since 2019

His Excellency Félix Tshisekedi
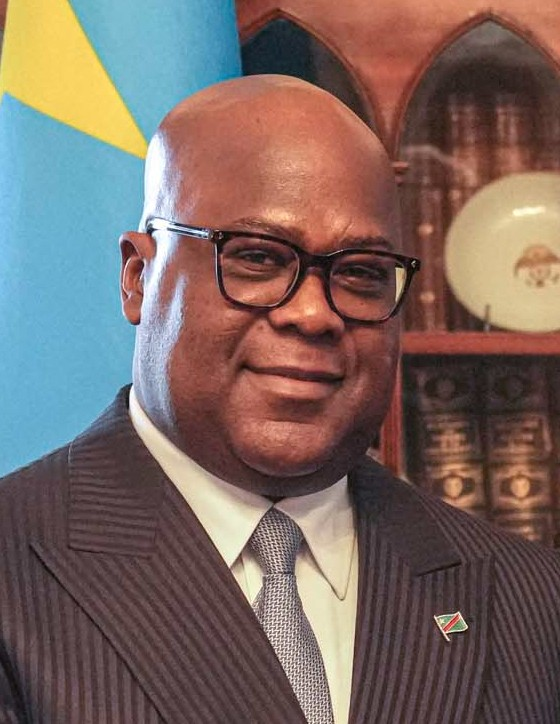
- Tshisekedi in 2026

5th President of the Democratic Republic of the Congo
- Incumbent
- Assumed office 24 January 2019
- Prime Minister: Bruno Tshibala; Sylvestre Ilunga; Sama Lukonde Kyenge; Judith Suminwa
- Preceded by: Joseph Kabila

Leader of the Union for Democracy and Social Progress
- Incumbent
- Assumed office 31 March 2018
- Preceded by: Étienne Tshisekedi

19th Chairperson of the African Union
- In office 6 February 2021 – 5 February 2022
- Preceded by: Cyril Ramaphosa
- Succeeded by: Macky Sall

Chairman of Southern African Development Community
- In office 17 August 2022 – 17 August 2023
- Preceded by: Filipe Nyusi
- Succeeded by: João Lourenço

Deputy of the National Assembly
- In office 28 November 2011 – 18 June 2013
- Constituency: Mbuji-Mayi

Personal details
- Born: Félix Antoine Tshisekedi Tshilombo; 13 June 1963 (age 63) Kinshasa, Democratic Republic of the Congo
- Party: Union for Democracy and Social Progress
- Spouse: Denise Nyakéru Tshisekedi
- Parent: Étienne Tshisekedi (father)
- Website: https://presidence.cd

Félix Antoine Tshisekedi Tshilombo (French: [feliks ɑ̃twan tʃisekedi tʃilombo]; born 13 June 1963) is a Congolese politician who is the fifth president of the Democratic Republic of the Congo, serving since 2019.

He was the leader of the Union for Democracy and Social Progress (UDPS), the DRC's oldest and largest party, succeeding his dead father Étienne Tshisekedi in that role, a three-time Prime Minister of Zaire and opposition leader during the reign of Mobutu Sese Seko. Tshisekedi was the UDPS party's candidate for president in the December 2018 general election, which he was awarded, after accusations of irregularities from several election monitoring organisations and other opposition parties. The Constitutional Court of the DRC upheld his victory after another opposition politician, Martin Fayulu, challenged the result, and Tshisekedi has been accused of making a deal with his predecessor, Joseph Kabila. The election marked the first peaceful transition of power since the DRC's independence from Belgium in 1960.

Since the Common Front for Congo (FCC) coalition, which is aligned with Kabila, still controlled the parliament and provincial governorships, Tshisekedi's ability to govern or appoint a new Prime Minister was limited for the first six months of his term. He named his coalition partner and political heavyweight, Vital Kamerhe, as his Chief of Cabinet, at first having designated him prime minister and not having the parliamentary support to have him successfully appointed. In May 2019, he reached a deal with the parliament's Kabila-aligned majority to appoint Sylvestre Ilunga prime minister. On 27 July 2019, negotiations finally ended between Tshisekedi and the parliament, agreeing on the formation of a new cabinet.

On 19 May 2024, there was a failed coup attempt against Tshisekedi, led by a group including opposition politician Christian Malanga. The attempted coup resulted in six deaths, including Malanga.

== Early life and education ==
Tshisekedi, a member of the Luba ethnic group, was born in Kinshasa on 13 June 1963 to mother Marthe and father Étienne Tshisekedi, who served as Prime Minister of Zaire in the 1990s. He had a comfortable life as a youth in the capital, but when his father created the UDPS in the early 1980s, publicly opposing Mobutu, Félix was forced to accompany him into house arrest in his native village in central Kasaï. This put his studies on hold. In 1985, Mobutu allowed him, his mother, and his brothers to leave Kasaï.

== Political career ==
=== Early political career ===
In late 2008, Tshisekedi was named the UDPS National Secretary for external relations. In November 2011, he obtained a seat in the National Assembly, representing the city of Mbuji Mayi in Kasai-Oriental province. He did not take his seat, citing a fraudulent election, and his mandate was invalidated for "absenteeism".

In May 2013, he refused a position of rapporteur at the Independent National Electoral Commission (CENI), saying that he did not want to put his political career on hold as CENI's article 17 excludes membership for those who are members of a political formation.

In October 2016, Tshisekedi became vice secretary general of the UDPS.

=== 2018 election to the presidency ===
On 31 March 2018, he was elected to lead the UDPS, after his father's death on 1 February 2017. The same day, the UDPS nominated him for president in the December 2018 general election.

On 10 January 2019, it was announced that Tshisekedi had won the presidency of the DRC in the December 2018 election. He defeated another opposition leader, Martin Fayulu, and Emmanuel Ramazani Shadary, who was supported by term-limited outgoing President Kabila, who had been president for 18 years. Fayulu, the runner-up, alleged vote rigging and challenged the election results. On 19 January, the Constitutional Court dismissed the challenge, officially making Tshisekedi president-elect. He was sworn in as president on 24 January 2019, taking office the next day. This marked the first time since the Congo gained independence in 1960 that an incumbent president peacefully transferred power to the opposition.

On 20 January, South Africa congratulated Tshisekedi on his election despite the African Union and EU warning of doubts over the result announced by the Constitutional Court.

=== Presidency (2019–present) ===
==== Domestic policy ====
After Tshisekedi was sworn in, it was reported that a member of Kabila's coalition would be picked to serve as his Prime Minister.

On 13 March 2019, Tshisekedi signed a decree to pardon approximately 700 prisoners, including imprisoned political opponents of Kabila, and this decision followed his promise given the week before to allow the return of exiles.

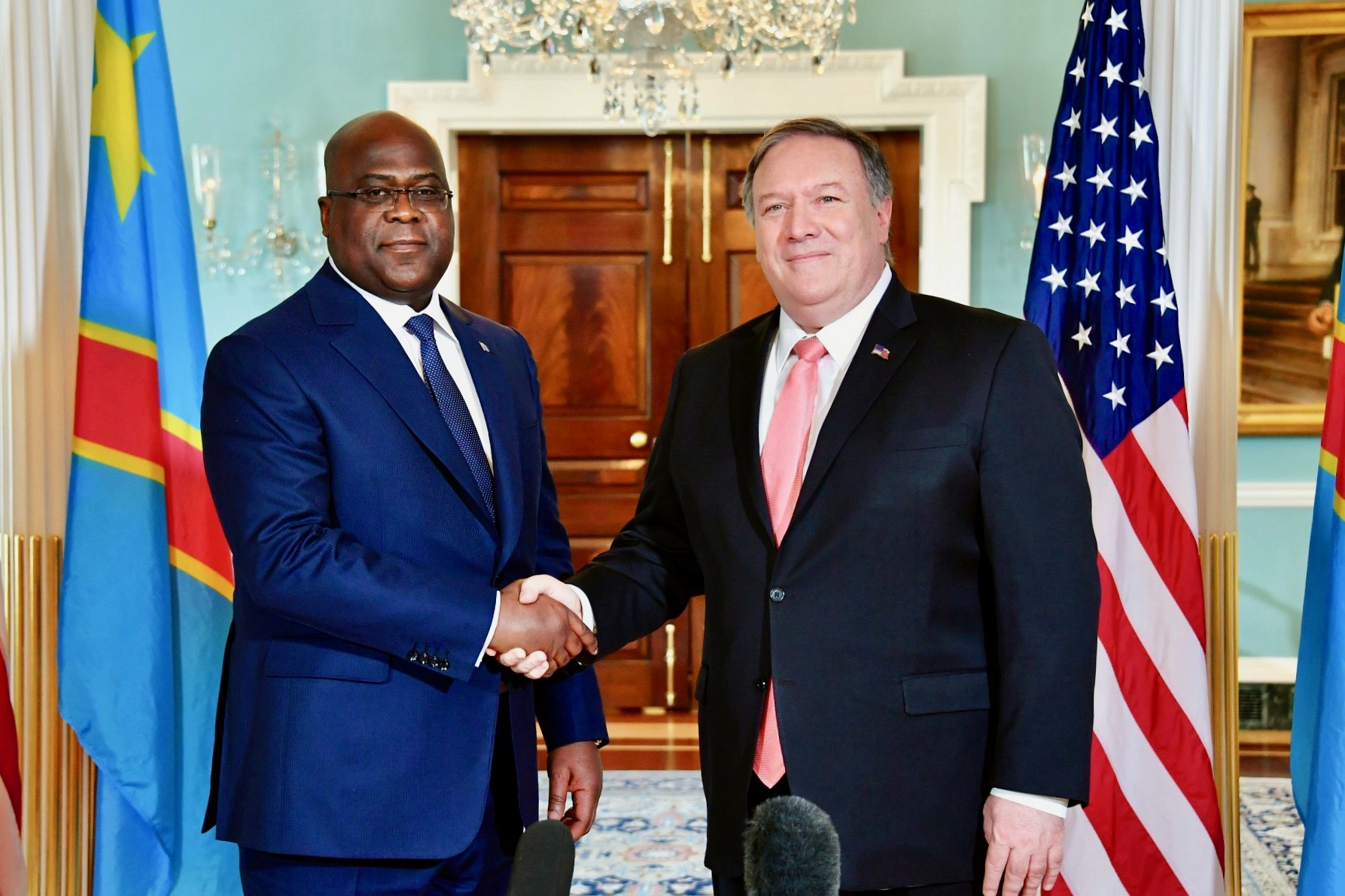
Félix Tshisekedi with U.S. Secretary of State Mike Pompeo, April 2019

In early 2019, negotiations were underway between Tshisekedi and Kabila's FCC coalition that controlled the National Assembly and Senate. In late April, Jeune Afrique reported that Kabila proposed to Tshisekedi the mining company executive Albert Yuma as a candidate for prime minister. Yuma supports the new Mining Code adopted in 2018, which put the DRC in dispute with international mining companies, and Tshisekedi has been under foreign pressure to not appoint him. The Civil Society of South Kivu recommended to Tshisekedi the appointment of his chief of staff Vital Kamerhe as prime minister. For months, Tshisekedi continued working with ministers of Kabila's government as he was hamstrung by parliament. He faced challenges in dealing with the Kivu conflict as well as the Ebola outbreak in the region. In early March, Tshisekedi started a program to improve infrastructure, transport, education, housing, communication, health, water, and agriculture.

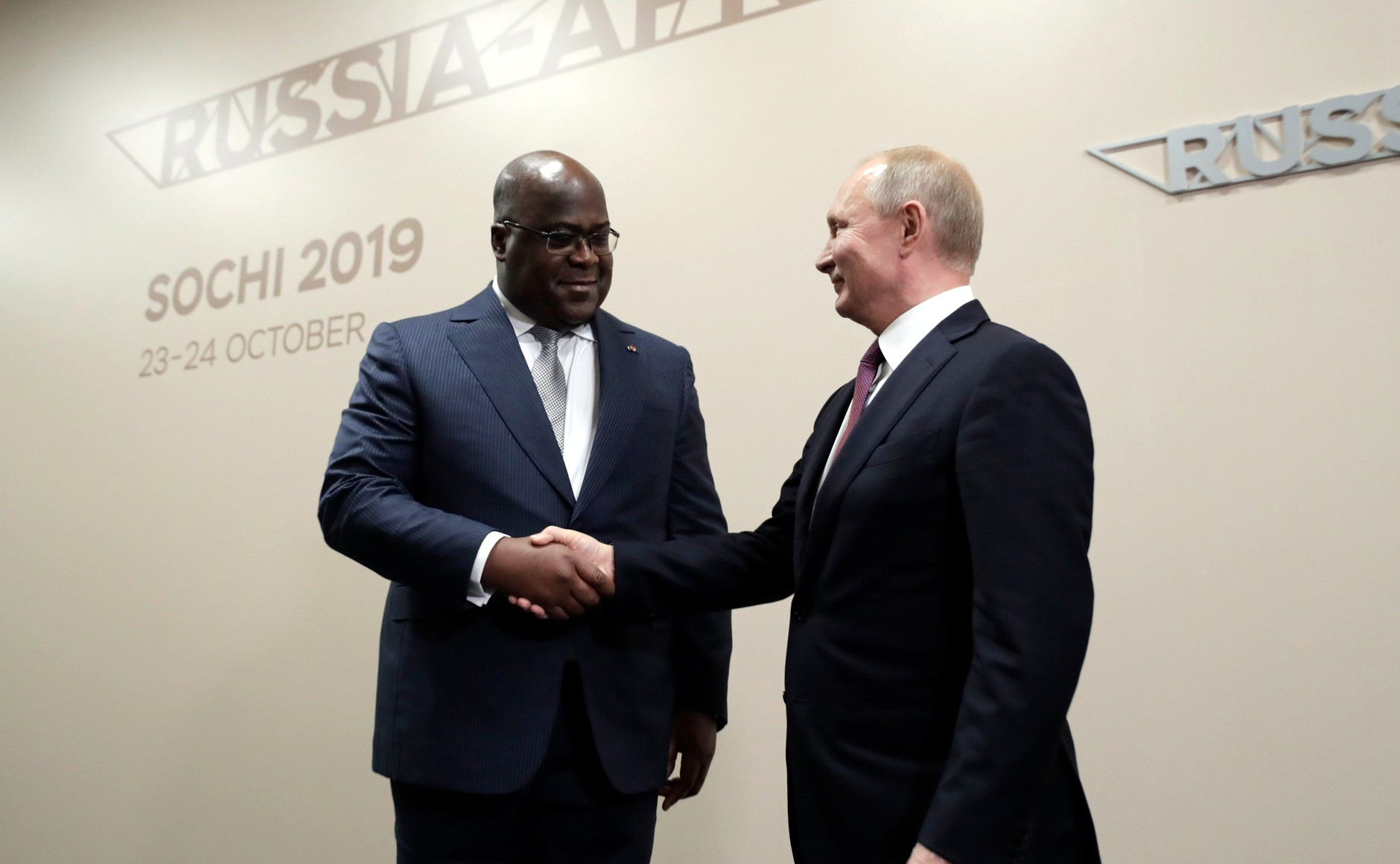
Tshisekedi and Russian President Vladimir Putin at the Russia–Africa Summit on 23 October 2019

Most of the provincial governorships were also won by Kabila-affiliated candidates.

On 20 May 2019, Tshisekedi reached a deal with the FCC coalition and Kabila, appointing the career civil servant Sylvestre Ilunga as prime minister. Ilunga began his political career in the 1970s and held a number of cabinet posts under Mobutu Sese Seko before his overthrow in 1997. He is also an ally of Kabila. In late July 2019, Tshisekedi reached a deal with parliament on forming a new government. Ilunga's new cabinet would include 65 members, 48 ministers and 17 vice-ministers, which should be divided between the Kabila-aligned FCC and Tshisekedi's CACH alliance. The majority of the ministries went to the FCC, including three of the six most important ones (Defence, Justice, and Finance), while the Foreign Affairs, Interior, and Budget portfolios went to Tshisekedi's allies.

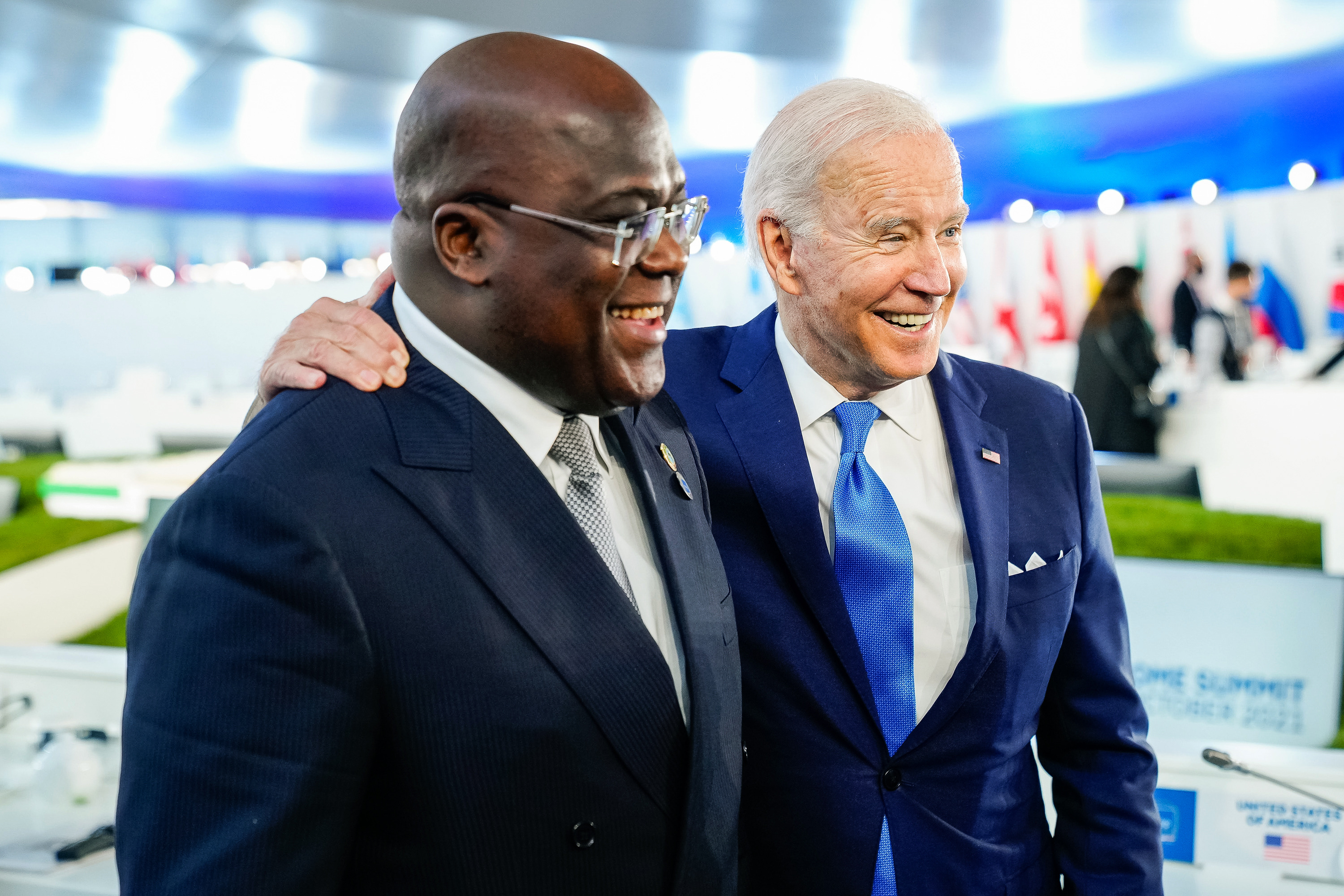
Tshisekedi and U.S. President Joe Biden at the 2021 G20 Rome summit, October 2021

After a power struggle saw the coalition with allies of Tshisekedi's predecessor break down and many legislators were won over, Ilunga was forced to leave office and Tshisekedi appointed Gécamines leader Jean-Michel Sama Lukonde as successor on 15 February 2021.

On 12 April 2021, Tshisekedi formally ended his two-year coalition with Kabila and his allies when prime minister Sama Lukonde formed a new government. On national television, Tshisekedi’s spokesman Kasongo Mwema Yamba Yamba announced a number of new appointments, including Antoinette N’Samba Kalambayi as mines minister. The president succeeded in ousting the last remaining elements of his government who were loyal to Kabila.

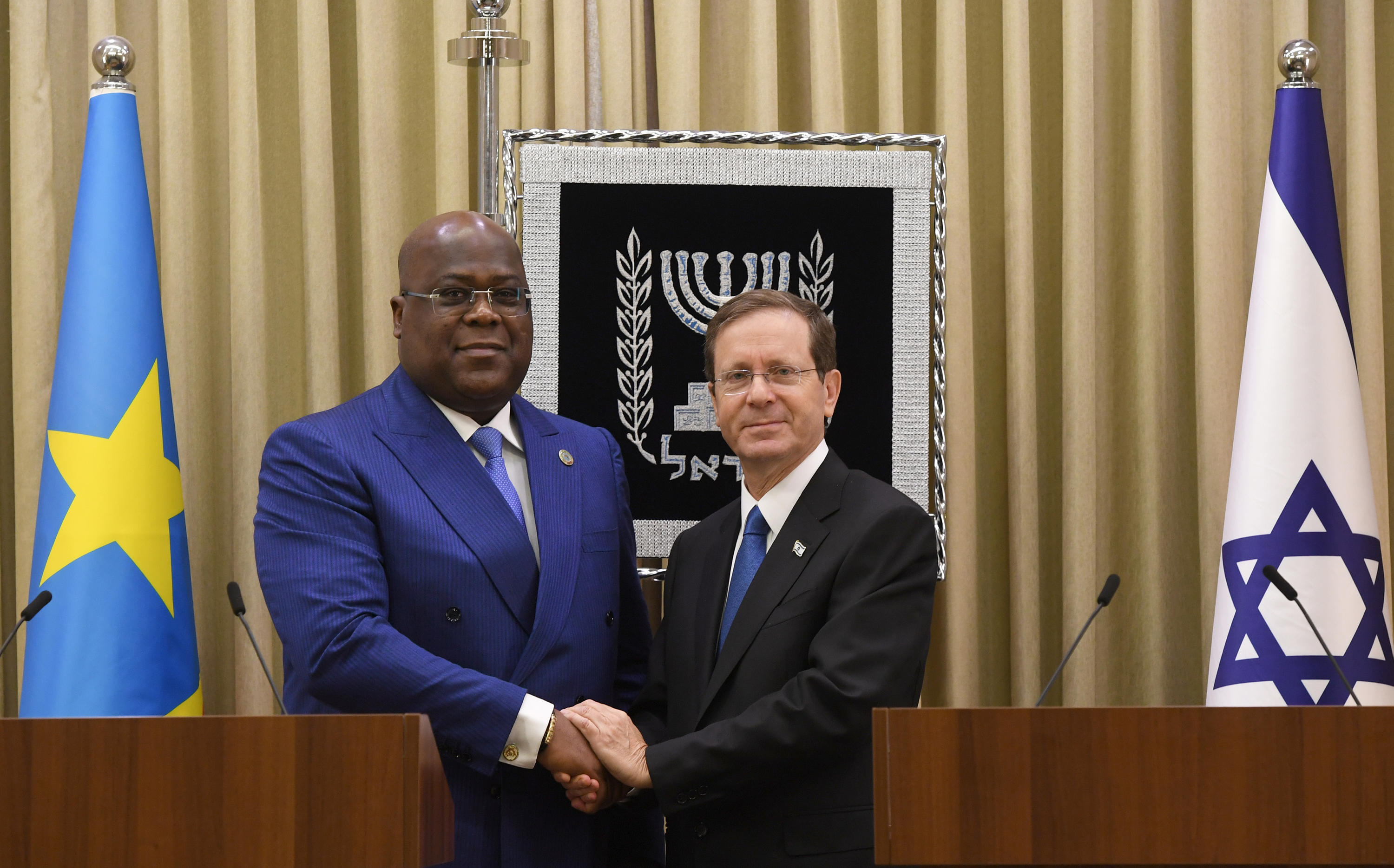
Tshisekedi with Israeli President Isaac Herzog in Jerusalem, Israel, October 2021

After the 2023 presidential election, Tshisekedi had a clear lead in his run for a second term. On 31 December 2023, officials said that Tshisekedi had been re-elected with 73% of the vote. Nine opposition candidates signed a declaration rejecting the election and called for a rerun.

On 19 May 2024, he was targeted, alongside his ally Vital Kamerhe, in an attempted coup launched by the self-proclaimed New Zaire, but managed to foil the attempt quickly.

On 6 May 2026, Tshisekedi announced his intention to amend the constitution of the Democratic Republic of the Congo, arguing that it was required by the US–DRC Strategic Partnership Agreement. On 9 November, Tshisekedi signed legislation that allows for a new draft constitution to be put to a national referendum, in a move seen as potentially allowing him to run for a third term as president, which is prohibited by the DRC's existing constitution and cannot be changed by an act of parliament.

==== Foreign policy ====
Tshisekedi has called for a review of mining contracts signed with China by his predecessor Joseph Kabila, especially the Sicomines multibillion 'minerals-for-infrastructure' deal. He has also promised to end and reverse deforestation in the Democratic Republic of the Congo by 2030, in the COP26 climate summit's first major agreement.

In October 2022, Tshisekedi ruled out bringing in Russian mercenaries to help quell a raging conflict in the east of the country and vowed to press on with economic development plans despite the insecurity in the region. Also that same month he announced military reforms to create a more cohesive national army, which has been a diverse mix of integrated rebel groups and the former military of Mobutu's Zaire. The reform included a new military spending bill. Other measures that he took to strengthen Congo's defenses included appointing new military chiefs, hiring Romanian private military contractors, and bringing additional peacekeepers from the EAC and SADC into the Kivu region.

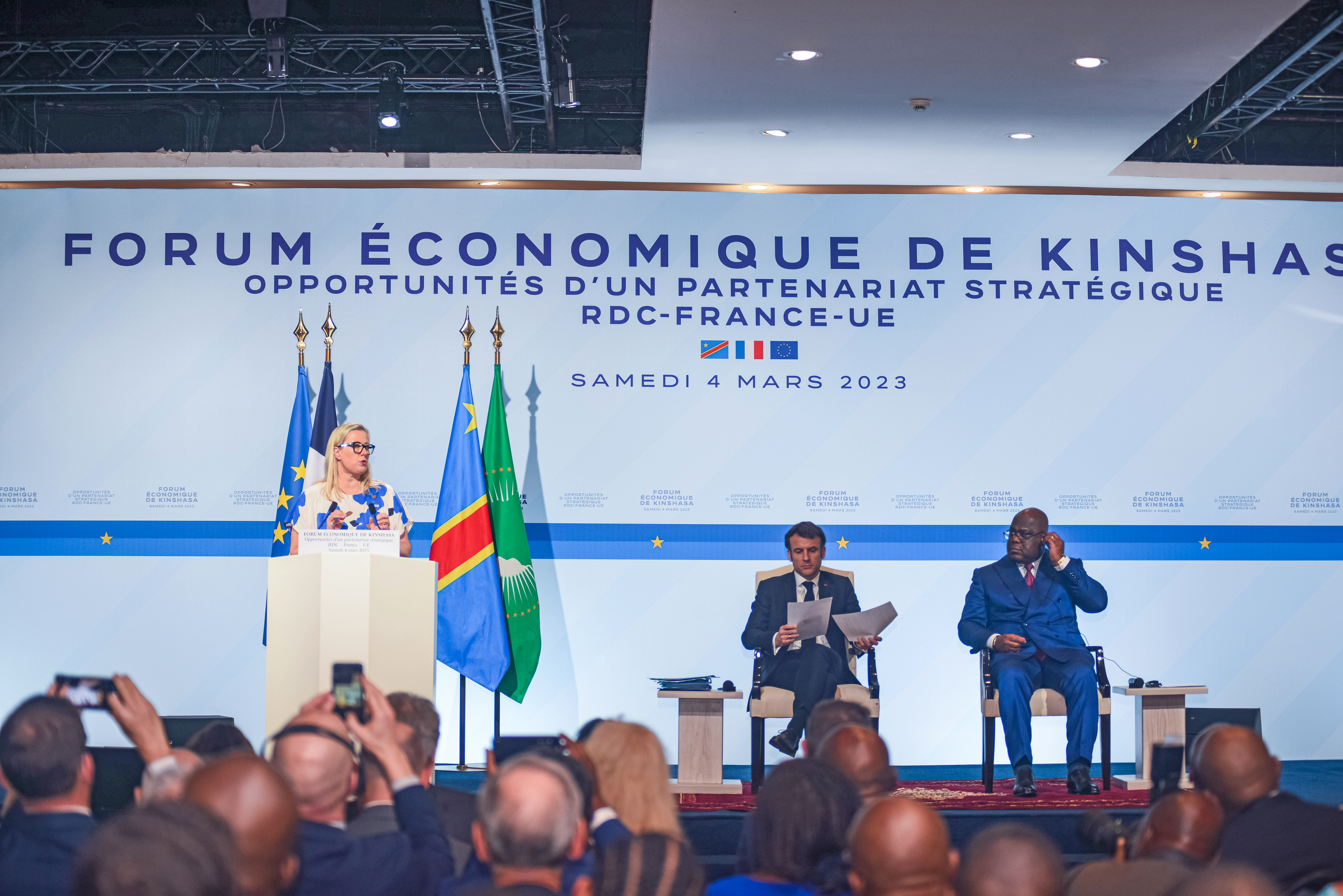
Tshisekedi with French President Emmanuel Macron and European Commissioner Jutta Urpilainen in Kinshasa, 4 March 2023

In May 2023, he visited China and met with Chinese President Xi Jinping to strengthen the partnership with China and renegotiate mining contracts for the DRC's mineral reserves. The Democratic Republic of Congo is a major producer and exporter of copper, uranium and cobalt.

In October 2024, Tshisekedi walked out of the Francophone heads of state retreat in Paris after French president Emmanuel Macron did not mention the conflicts in the eastern DRC in his speech. He also boycotted a luncheon hosted by Organisation internationale de la Francophonie head and former Rwandan foreign minister Louise Mushikiwabo.

On 18 January 2025, Tshisekedi reaffirmed Kinshasa's refusal to engage in dialogue with the M23 rebels, stating, "Legitimizing these criminals would be an insult to the victims and to international law".

Due to Rwanda's support for the Goma offensive by the M23 rebels, the DRC severed diplomatic ties between the two countries on 26 January 2025. Tshisekedi called for a national mobilization, urging citizens to rally behind FARDC against what he called "Rwanda's barbaric aggression". On 4 December 2025, Tshisekedi signed the Washington Peace Accords with Rwanda, which also included the US–DRC Strategic Partnership Agreement. On 8 December, Tshisekedi publicly accused Rwanda of violating the peace agreement.

== Honours ==
- Central African Republic:
  - Grand Cross of the Order of Reconnaissance of Central African (December 2019)
- Chad:
  - Grand Cross of the National Order of Chad (June 2024)
- Guinea-Bissau:
  - Recipient of the Medal of Amílcar Cabral (July 2021)
- Kazakhstan:
  - Order of Friendship, 1st class (10 September 2025)

== See also ==
- List of current heads of state and government
- List of heads of state of the Democratic Republic of the Congo
- List of heads of the executive by approval rating

Party political offices
Preceded by Étienne Tshisekedi	Leader of the Union for Democracy and Social Progress; 2018–present	Incumbent
Political offices
Preceded by Joseph Kabila	President of the Democratic Republic of the Congo; 2019–present	Incumbent
Diplomatic posts
Preceded by Cyril Ramaphosa	Chairperson of the African Union; 2021–2022	Succeeded by Macky Sall
