= 2024 Democratic Republic of the Congo coup attempt =

Attempted coup d'état in the Democratic Republic of the Congo

Date	19 May 2024
Location	Kinshasa, Democratic Republic of the Congo
Result	Coup d'état failed

Belligerents
Democratic Republic of the Congo; Armed Forces of the Democratic Republic of the Congo; Republican Guard; Congolese National Police; National Intelligence Agency	New Zaire Government in Exile; United Congolese Party

Commanders and leaders
Félix Tshisekedi; Vital Kamerhe	Christian Malanga †

Strength
Unknown	50+

Casualties and losses
2 police officers killed	4 killed 50 captured
- Several civilians injured

On 19 May 2024, an attempted coup d'état took place in the Democratic Republic of the Congo. Targeting President Félix Tshisekedi and his Economy Minister Vital Kamerhe, the assailants attacked both the Palais de la Nation and Kamerhe's residence. They were heavily armed and put up an intense fight at the Kamerhe home. At least one shell from the fighting detonated in the nearby capital of the Republic of the Congo, Brazzaville, causing several injuries.

The coup attempt was foiled quickly by the security forces. The orchestrator of the coup was Christian Malanga, a Congolese native who lived in the United States as a political asylee. Malanga founded a US-registered party, the United Congolese Party, in 2010, Then in 2017, in Belgium, he proclaimed himself head of the New Zaire Government in Exile, referring to himself as president. He was killed during the attempted coup. His son and two other American nationals were captured, tried and sentenced to death as part of a group of more than 50 people, but were repatriated to the United States after their sentences were commuted to life imprisonment by President Tshisekedi.

== Background ==
The coup attempt occurred amid a political crisis that gripped President Félix Tshisekedi's ruling party. The crisis revolved around an election for the leadership of parliament, initially slated for 18 May 2024 but subsequently deferred. One of the targeted politicians was an ally of Tshisekedi, Economy Minister Vital Kamerhe, who was running for the presidency of the National Assembly.

== Events ==
Fighting was reported in the capital, Kinshasa, in the early hours of 19 May, coinciding with Pentecost Sunday, at approximately 04:30. Clashes between men wearing camouflage fatigues holding assault rifles and the security forces were reported near the Palais du Peuple, which the assailants managed to enter. Twenty others attacked Vital Kamerhe's residence at Tshatshi Boulevard in the Gombe neighborhood, but were foiled by his security guards. Gunfire was also reported near the Palais de la Nation, with bullet casings, bloodstains, and shattered glass being seen at its entrance.

The attackers displayed flags of Zaire, as the country was known during the dictatorship of Mobutu. Some of the attackers also wore patches with the US flag. They declared that they wished to see a regime change. Images circulating on social networks showed men in military fatigues, armed with AK47s and chanting "Tshisekedi out" in English. Malanga appeared on a livestreamed video on his Facebook page depicting him at the entrance of the Palais de la Nation flanked by men wearing camouflage with the Zairean flag. Malanga shouted: "Felix, you're out. We are coming for you."

The Congolese army was subsequently deployed in Kinshasa along with armored vehicles. Roadblocks were installed near the Palais du Peuple and other parts of the capital.

Army spokesman Brigadier General Sylvain Ekenge said at a media briefing later that Malanga was killed after resisting arrest by the Republican Guard during the fighting at the Palais de la Nation. Malanga's Utah-born son Marcel Malanga, age 21, was also arrested by the Congolese army. At least 50 people, including three US nationals, were arrested in connection with the coup attempt. Some of them were also reported to be carrying Canadian passports.

== Casualties ==
Two police officers who were guarding Kamerhe's residence were killed during the coup attempt, as were four attackers, including their leader Christian Malanga. Several people were injured after a shell fired from Kinshasa flew across the Congo River and landed on a neighborhood of Brazzaville, the neighboring capital of the Republic of the Congo.

== Investigation ==
Initial reports said that the attackers were members of the Congolese military before it was found that they were linked to Christian Malanga. Malanga moved from the Democratic Republic of the Congo to the United States in the late 1990s and worked as a car salesman in Utah before returning to the DRC to serve as an army officer. He went into exile in 2012 after a coup attempt in the DRC the previous year. While in exile, he declared himself president of "New Zaire" and described himself as the president of the United Congolese Party, which he referred to as an "opposition political party-in-exile." A DRC army spokesman initially described Malanga as a naturalized U.S. citizen, but the U.S. Department of State stated that there was no indication Malanga had acquired U.S. citizenship.

Ekenge said that the army had apprehended a "French national" who he described as the second-in-command of the group. The French Foreign Ministry said it was aware of reports a French national was being held and was in contact with Congolese authorities.

Apart from Marcel Malanga, two US nationals were also captured during the coup. The second national was identified as Benjamin Reuben Zalman-Polun, a business associate of Malanga. Zalman-Polun graduated from the University of Colorado and attended business administration classes at Georgetown University. In 2015 Zalman-Polun pleaded guilty to drug trafficking. Zalman-Polun became a business associate of Malanga through a gold mining company that was set up in Mozambique in 2022, according to an official journal published by Mozambique's government, and a report by Africa Intelligence newsletter. Also arrested was Tyler Thompson (originally misidentified as Taylor Thomson), a 21-year-old friend and former high school football teammate of Marcel Malanga. Thompson's family expressed shock at his alleged involvement, saying that he was vacationing in Africa with some family friends and had no prior political activity. They added that the DRC was not part of his stated itinerary.

Another American, a 22-year-old FedEx worker and former high school football teammate of Thompson and Marcel Malanga, said that Marcel had offered him $50,000 to $100,000 to act as a security guard for his father for four months in the DRC; the man, who lives in Utah, declined the offer, because Marcel was vague on the details of the proposed job. Other colleagues of Marcel said that he had made various propositions to entice them to go with him to the DRC, describing the opportunity at various points as a family vacation or as a service project to build wells in impoverished communities.

== Reactions ==
The coup attempt lasted three hours, after which the army declared that it had been 'foiled' and was 'under control'. The US embassy issued a security alert urging caution after reports of gunfire, with ambassador Lucy Tamlyn saying that they were cooperating with Congolese authorities in the investigation and pledging to "hold accountable any American citizen involved". On 3 June, the embassy said that Congolese authorities had not given them details or allowed access to the American nationals detained over their alleged involvement in the coup attempt. France's ambassador reported automatic weapons fire in Gombe and urged French nationals to avoid the area.

Following the arrests, many social media users and some local media outlets speculated that the Americans involved were CIA operatives. Videos of two of the detained Americans pleading with Congolese soldiers circulated widely online, and some outlets reported that the men were believed to be CIA agents. Ambassador Lucy Tamlyn denied that the US government was involved.

The head of the African Union Commission, Moussa Faki, strongly condemned the attempted coup and welcomed its suppression by the Congolese security forces.

== Trials ==
Fifty-three people were formally charged with various offences related to the coup such as terrorism, murder and criminal association, some of which are capital offences. After Christian Malanga and another deceased person were removed from the list, a televised court-martial for the remaining 51 suspects, including Marcel Malanga, Benjamin Reuben Zalman-Polun, and Tyler Thompson, began at the Ndolo military prison in Kinshasa on 7 June. During the course of the trial, Marcel Malanga and Zalman-Polun said that they had been coerced by Christian Malanga to participate in the coup, adding that the latter had threatened to kill them. Human Rights Watch criticised the inclusion of Jean-Jacques Wondo, a Belgian-Congolese researcher on political and security issues, as a defendant in the case, saying that the grounds for the charges against him appeared to be a photograph of him and Christian Malanga that was taken in 2016.

On 27 August, the death penalty was requested against 50 defendants, including the three Americans. The public prosecutor also asked the court to confiscate all objects used in the commission of the offenses, for the benefit of the Congolese state. However, prosecutors spared one defendant who was suffering from "psychological problems". The court issued its verdict on 13 September, and sentenced 37 defendants to death, including Marcel Malanga, Zalman-Polun, Thompson, Wondo, a British national of Congolese origin, and a Canadian national of Congolese origin. The remaining 14 defendants were acquitted. The convicted were also ordered to pay more than 145 billion Congolese francs ($50 million) in damages to the Congolese state. An appeal against the decision was filed by lawyers representing the three Americans on 17 September.

In February 2025, Jean-Jacques Wondo was repatriated to Belgium on medical grounds. On 1 April 2025, President Tshisekedi commuted the death sentences of Marcel Malanga, Zalman-Polun, and Thompson to life imprisonment. On 9 April, the three were returned to the US to serve out their sentences. On 10 April, the three were charged by the US Department of Justice with conspiring to provide weapons, explosives and other support to a rebel army aimed at overthrowing a foreign government. A fourth person, Joseph Peter Moesser, was also charged with providing explosives training and instructions at his residence in Utah, as well as contributing weapons. All four defendants pled not guilty to the charges.

== See also ==
- Patrice Lumumba
- Second Mobutu coup d'état
- 2004 Democratic Republic of the Congo coup attempt
