= Assassination of Laurent-Désiré Kabila =

2001 murder of DR Congo president

- Part of the Second Congo War
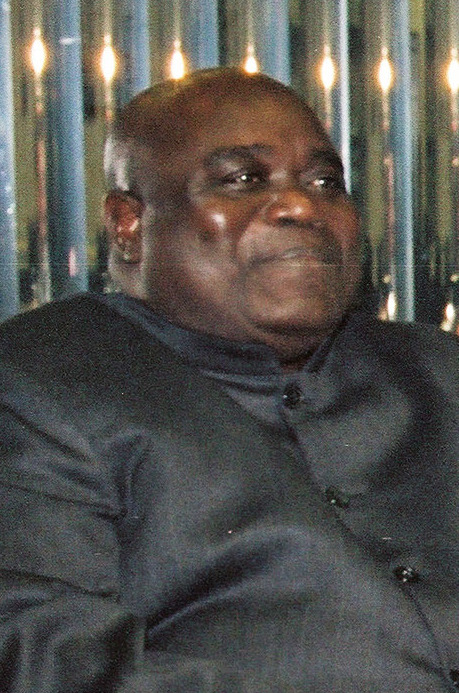
- Kabila in 1998
- Location: 4.3639°S 15.2506°E; Palais de Marbre, Kinshasa, Democratic Republic of the Congo
- Date: 16 January 2001
- Attack type: Assassination
- Weapon: Revolver (unspecified)
- Deaths: 2
- Victim: Laurent-Désiré Kabila
- Assailant: Rashidi Mizele

The location of the assassination attempt.

On 16 January 2001, Laurent-Désiré Kabila, then-President of the Democratic Republic of the Congo, was assassinated in his office at the Palais de Marbre, Kinshasa by Rashidi Mizele (or Kasereka), an 18-year-old bodyguard who had fought as a child soldier (kadogo) in the First Congo War under Kabila's command. Mizele was later shot dead, while Kabila's son Joseph assumed presidency, a position he would hold for 18 years.

== Background ==
Kabila had been responsible for the deaths of many kadogos. The immediate day before his execution, he had overseen the execution of 47 kadogos accused of plotting to kill him. This in turn deteriorated Kabila's reputation among his subordinates and put his life in jeopardy.

In November 2000, Kabila thought that he had discovered a plot against him, and had arrested, tormented, and killed soldiers loyal to Commandant Anselme Masasu Nindaga, who had days earlier made a speech at a reunion for 1,200 kadogos in Kinshasa. The conspiracy to murder Kabila began in early January 2001, when a group of kadogos traveled to Brazzaville and prepared Operation Mbongo Zero.

== Assassination ==
The conspirators' scheme, known as Operation Mbongo Zero, outlined how they would infiltrate important buildings in the capital, such as the Palais de Marbre. Mbongo means "bull" in Swahili and "money" in Lingala. After gaining access to the palace, the perpetrators would approach the president with a revolver and fire at him. Rashidi Mizele was reported to have said "I will kill him".

=== Attack ===
On 16 January 2001, the assassin entered the president's office as Kabila was discussing with economics adviser Emile Mota about inviting French officials to a meeting he hoped would protect his presidency. Mizele bent over Kabila, pulled out a revolver and shot the president four times in the abdomen. He escaped the palace with other conspirators amidst gunfire.

Former Health Minister Leonard Mashako Mamba was next door to the office when Kabila was shot and arrived immediately after the shots were fired. Mwenze Kongolo had been waiting for admission to the palace at 1:45 pm and heard gunshots being fired inside the building. Other bodyguards rushed into the room and fired at Mizele, who was hit first in the leg, then twice more to make sure he was dead. After 15 minutes, Kabila was in a helicopter headed to a clinic in Gombe, Kinshasa. Curfew that day started at 6 pm, and after 8 hours, a motorcade set off from the clinic for the long drive to N'djili Airport, escorting the ambulance.

Kabila was rushed in a helicopter to Harare, Zimbabwe for medical treatment, but was declared dead on 18 January 2001 at 10 am.

== Funeral ==
Kabila received a state funeral on 20 January 2001 when his body, placed in a gold-plated white coffin covered with the DRC flag, was flown first to his hometown of Moba and then to Lubumbashi, where it was displayed for a day before being moved to Kinshasa.

On 23 January, an ecumenical service of nearly three hours was held at the Palais du Peuple. During the prayers, religious leaders appealed for peace, unity, and love among Congolese people, and urged the nation's political leadership to maintain cohesion. In her funeral address, the representative of the Constituent Assembly–Transitional Parliament (Assemblée Consituante-Parlement de Transition; ACL-PT) declared that honoring Kabila's memory required "driving out of national territory the Rwandan, Burundian, and Ugandan aggressors", and demanding their "immediate and unconditional withdrawal". She emphasized that Kabila's life embodied an "ideal of loyalty", noting his vow never to betray the country, and proposed the construction of a monument inscribed with "je ne trahirai jamais" ("I will never betray"). A representative of the courts praised Kabila's "strong sense of justice" and his efforts to combat impunity on behalf of the Congolese people. Speaking for the government, Minister of the Interior and Security, Decentralization, and Customary Affairs Gaëtan Kakudji appealed to the UN, the Organisation of African Unity (OAU), and the international community to accelerate implementation of United Nations Security Council resolutions aimed at ending the war. He pledged governmental support to Joseph Kabila and called on all Congolese to unite in true and lasting reconciliation.

After the service, the coffin was carried out in a massive procession of several hundred vehicles and a crowd so large it overwhelmed protocol and security, accompanying it along a ten-kilometer route to the Palais de la Nation. At 15:35 GMT, Kabila was interred in the Mausolée de Laurent Désiré Kabila, located at the entrance of the Palais de la Nation on the site once occupied by a bust of King Leopold II of Belgium, while his composition "l'hymne aux opprimés" ("the hymn to the oppressed") played, a 21-gun salute was fired, and three Congolese Air Force Dassault Mirage jets flew overhead. The ceremony was attended by several international leaders, among them Angolan president José Eduardo dos Santos, Zimbabwean president Robert Mugabe, Namibian president Sam Nujoma, Zambian president Frederick Chiluba, Sudanese president Omar al-Bashir, Tanzania's vice president Ali Mohamed Shein, Kenya's deputy president George Saitoti, the Central African Republic's defense minister, Iran's foreign minister, Libya's Jamahiriya chief of staff Bashir Saleh, Algeria's deputy prime minister, Belgium's foreign minister Louis Michel, and Morocco's minister of Foreign Affairs, African Cooperation, and Moroccan Expatriates.

== Aftermath ==
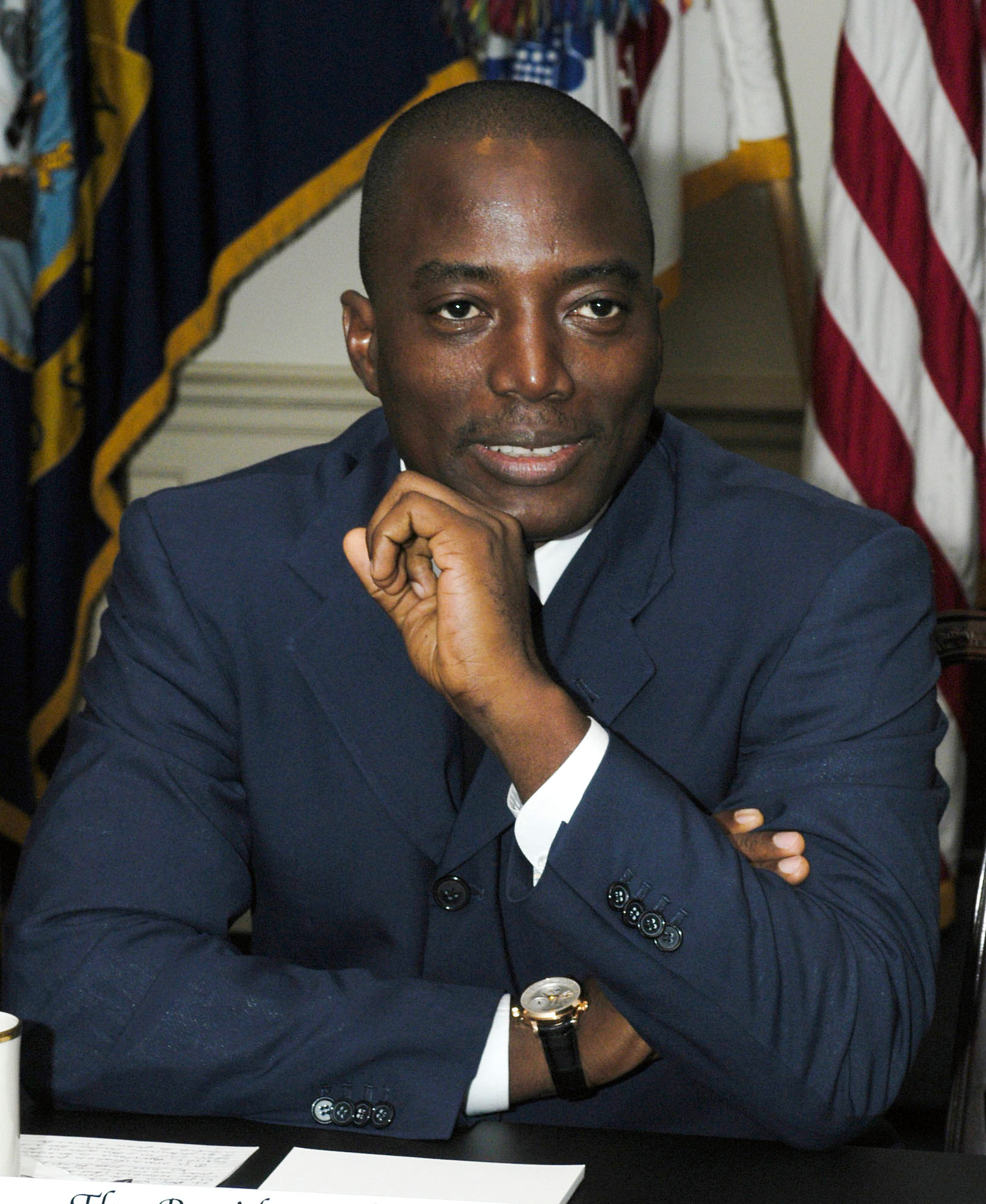
Then-29-year-old Joseph Kabila succeeded his father to the presidency

=== Government meeting and Joseph Kabila's appointment ===
On 17 January, an urgent meeting of government officials was announced through a radio-televised statement signed by Jean Mbuyu Luyongola, the First Deputy Director of the Presidency in charge of legal affairs. The announcement summoned all ministers, ministers of state, and vice-ministers to the African Union City, while urging the public to remain calm and continue their daily activities. Many analysts interpreted this meeting as an attempt by the authorities to define their stance after Kabila's death, which had not yet been officially confirmed. Communication Minister Dominique Sakombi Inongo later reported on RTNC, the national broadcasting network, that the Council of Ministers had appointed Major General Joseph Kabila, son of Laurent-Désiré Kabila, as head of government and supreme commander of the Congolese Armed Forces (Forces Armées Congolaises; FAC), making him the first head of state to be born in the 1970s.

On 18 January, RCD rebel commander Jean-Pierre Ondekane declared that his movement would not recognize Joseph Kabila as the new head of state, saying, "We will fiercely oppose this state of affairs". He argued that such a succession reduced the DRC to a monarchy characterized by hereditary leadership, and insisted that the leadership transition instead adhere to the provisions of the 1999 Lusaka Ceasefire Agreement, which outlined the establishment of a transitional government until national elections could be held. Ondekane urged an emergency convening of the political committee involving the agreement's signatories and observers from the United Nations (UN) and the Organization of African Unity (OAU). On 19 January in Brussels, both armed and unarmed opposition groups demanded the consensual creation of a transitional authority in the DRC prior to the launch of the Inter-Congolese Dialogue envisioned in the Lusaka Agreement, rejected Kinshasa's right to manage the presidential succession, and appealed to the United Nations Security Council for the rapid deployment of United Nations Mission in the Democratic Republic of Congo (MONUC) forces. Representatives of the Movement for the Liberation of the Congo – Congo Liberation Front (MLC/FLC), the Democratic Social Christian Party (PSDC), and various other opposition factions were present at the press conference, while Étienne Tshisekedi's UDPS and the RCD-Goma were absent. Albert Ndele, former governor of the National Bank of Congo, participated as a representative of civil society.

=== Assassin ===
Considerable uncertainty also surrounded the identity of the assassin: some accounts claimed the killer was one of Kabila's bodyguards; others pointed to the Vice Minister Dieudonné Kayembe Mbandakulu, whom Kabila had recently dismissed after accusing him of serious mismanagement. Still other reports suggested that Joseph Kabila himself may have been involved. Speaking on Belgian television, former Foreign Minister Bizima Kahara asserted from Goma, "without providing further details", that Major General Joseph Kabila was the one who shot his father. Multiple arrests were later made within the army, which was suspected of orchestrating the attack, with officials promising additional details following a government meeting. A group of kadogos were eventually detained and confessed to participating in the operation, claiming the killing was retaliation for Kabila's betrayal after he met with their longtime enemy, Paul Kagame. According to Justice Minister Mwenze Kongolo, the shooter was Rashidi Kasereka, who was later killed while attempting to flee the Palais de Marbre.

It has also been assumed that a bodyguard had shot Kabila. An investigation found 135 people who were accused of the killing of Kabila, including 4 children. Some sources stated 115 were accused. No one was found to be the killer of Kabila. The RFI had stated on the air a radio message in France of Kabila's death. Foreign Minister Louis Michel told RTBF that Kabila's death was not a coup d'etat but was rather "an argument that descended into violence". Michel had also stated that "[Kabila was] dead, killed by his own bodyguard, who had "apparently fired two bullets."

The assassin, Kasereka was in the Brazzaville-Kinshasa area before his death. 26 people, including Kabila's own cousin, Colonel Eddy Kapend, were sentenced to death, although they weren't under any capital punishment. 45 were proclaimed innocent and exonerated. 64 defendants were jailed. According to the German press agency DPA, the alleged summary had seen the execution of Commandant Masasu and 34 of his colleagues. The persecution of members of ethnic groups from eastern Congo continued.

In Goma, a spokesperson had confirmed that officers of the Congolese Armed Forces had staged a coup d'état against Kabila. Interior Minister Gaëtan Kakudji had denied this fact. Eddy Kapend made the following appearance on the Congolese television: “To the Army Chief of Staff, to commander of ground, air and naval forces and all regional military commanders: I order you to take charge of your units.” He continued, “Until further notice, no guns shall be fired for whatever reason.”

19 years later, on 8 January 2021, President Félix Tshisekedi pardoned 28 of the convicted inmates who served their sentences in 2005 from the Makala Central Prison in Kinshasa. The countries involved have been speculated to be Rwanda which had been rivals with the Congo for a long period of time, and Angola.

== Reaction ==
=== Democratic Republic of the Congo ===
President Kabila's death appeared to catch much of Congolese society off guard, giving the impression of an unexpected incident rather than a carefully planned plot, an interpretation reinforced by the way his loyalists have tried to manage public reaction, repeatedly invoking "loyalty", as Colonel Eddy Kapend emphasized in his 16 January message. Speaking to international radio networks, several political actors, including MLC leader Jean-Pierre Bemba, RCD-Goma spokesperson Tryphon Kin-Kiey Mulumba, and FONUS president Joseph Olenghankoy, called for "true reconciliation of the Congolese people". The Congolese Socialist Union (Union Socialiste Congolaise; USC), a Brazzaville-based opposition party, strongly denounced the killing, arguing that an assassination could never resolve the national crisis. In the rebel-held Bukavu area, witnesses reported public celebrations following news of Kabila's death. Reports also indicated that Jean-Pierre Bemba stated his movement now had a chance to pursue peace and negotiate.

The UDPS leader, Étienne Tshisekedi, sent his condolences to the Kabila family and criticized the Kinshasa authorities for failing to officially confirm the president's death, calling it "an open secret". He also expressed sympathy for the families of the other victims killed in the same attack. Tshisekedi urged all warring parties to "end the war immediately throughout the entire country, now that the source of the armed confrontations no longer exists". He requested that a meeting be organized swiftly in Gaborone under the guidance of President Quett Masire, bringing together the Kinshasa government, RCD-Goma, RCD-ML, the MLC, and himself as part of the Inter-Congolese Dialogue. Tshisekedi also appealed to DRC's neighbors, especially those militarily involved, to help the Congolese establish a democratic, united, and sovereign state. He called on UN Secretary-General Kofi Annan to deploy MONUC troops as soon as possible, in accordance with the 1999 Lusaka Ceasefire Agreement, and urged Congolese citizens to put aside their divisions and embrace unity, solidarity, and national reconciliation.

=== Rwanda ===
Charles Murigande, Secretary General of the ruling Rwandan Patriotic Front (RPF), stated that Kabila had ultimately fallen victim to "his own contradictions". In comments to a PanAfrican News Agency correspondent, he expressed hope that "those who take over will show more reason" in their relations with Rwanda. Addressing Rwanda's backing of the Rwandan-backed rebel movement, the Rally for Congolese Democracy (RCD), Murigande explained that this support "could evolve in one direction or another, following the death of our common adversary".

=== Belgium ===
In Brussels, Prime Minister Guy Verhofstadt announced that Belgium would send commando units to Libreville, Gabon, to prepare for a possible evacuation of 2,500 Belgian nationals in Kinshasa if conditions deteriorated. Ten commando paratroopers were sent to Libreville and later flew on to Kinshasa to reinforce the military contingent protecting the Belgian Embassy. Another aircraft carrying 25 paratrooper commandos departed Brussels for Libreville to position itself for a potential evacuation of Belgian expatriates. Inside Belgium, Foreign Minister Louis Michel faced criticism for announcing Kabila's death late on the evening of 17 January; Le Soir wrote that "at the moment Louis Michel announced his death, Kabila was probably still breathing; the announcement was certainly premature and, in any case, imprudent". Foreign Ministry spokesperson Michel Malherbe responded that Louis Michel stood by his statements, noting that further sources had since corroborated the information.

=== Libya ===
Colonel Muammar Gaddafi asserted that the developments in the Democratic Republic of the Congo would not destabilize Africa as a whole. He described the events as another complication added to Congo's long-standing political crisis, which has persisted since independence, and expressed that "this time, there are additional concerns regarding Congo's unity, insofar as there is no hope for an immediate reconciliation between the various conflicting parties in the country". Gaddafi urged Africans to assist the Congolese in safeguarding "national unity, rather than exploiting the situation to expose their territories to fragmentation and disintegration".

=== Zimbabwe ===
Zimbabwe, Laurent-Désiré Kabila's closest military partner, reacted with profound shock when news of his assassination became public. Interviews conducted by the state-owned the Herald revealed that many Zimbabweans were stunned by the announcement. On 17 January, Colonel Gaddafi and President Robert Mugabe spoke by phone to review the situation in the Democratic Republic of the Congo. Mugabe assured Gaddafi that reports from Kinshasa indicated calm and that daily activities were continuing as usual. Earlier that same day, Gaddafi had also spoken with Namibian President Sam Nujoma, before Kabila's death was officially confirmed, during which Nujoma said that the situation in the DRC remained "stable and calm". Mugabe then declared three days of national mourning for Kabila and insisted that Zimbabwe and the incoming Congolese authorities must remain firmly committed to defending their sovereignty. He added that Kabila's assassination would not disrupt relations between the two countries.

However, according to the Integrated Regional Information Network (IRIN), Zimbabwe's opposition Movement for Democratic Change (MDC) viewed the deployment of more than 11,000 Zimbabwean troops in the DRC as excessively costly and deeply unpopular. The MDC's secretary-general, Welshman Ncube, argued that ZANU-PF should use Kabila's "unexpected" death as an opportunity to begin withdrawing forces, claiming that Mugabe's justification, that the mission was meant to assist the Congolese, masked personal business interests tied to mining concessions and financial arrangements offered by Kabila's government to senior Zimbabwean officials and military officers. A Congolese delegation led by Education Minister Abdoulaye Yerodia Ndombasi met with Mugabe to finalize arrangements for Kabila's funeral. His remains were flown out of Harare on 20 January, bound first for his hometown of Lubumbashi and then for the capital, Kinshasa.

=== Namibia ===
Namibia, whose president, Sam Nujoma, left Yaoundé's 21st Africa–France Summit upon learning of his ally's death, condemned the assassination and announced that its forces would continue to hold "defensive positions" inside the DRC until MONUC forces were fully deployed. According to a statement from Mocks Shikalepo Shivute, Secretary-General of the Ministry of Foreign Affairs, Namibian forces, deployed as part of the SADC Allied Forces to protect the DRC's sovereignty and maintain peace, would remain in the country as long as necessary to deter any aggression. Namibia emphasized the importance of adhering to the Lusaka Ceasefire Agreement and warned against exploiting the power vacuum created by Kabila's sudden death. While it was not yet clear whether the assassination was carried out by a lone individual or as part of a wider conspiracy, Namibia stressed that those responsible should be identified and held accountable. Namibia reaffirmed its friendship with the Congolese people, expressed confidence that the SADC community sympathized with them, extended congratulations to Major General Joseph Kabila on his appointment as the interim head of state, and expressed hope that he would continue the late president's efforts toward peace, stability, and reform. Namibia also reiterated its call for the prompt and full implementation of United Nations Security Council resolutions addressing the DRC crisis to support the peace process.

=== Zambia ===
Zambian President Frederick Chiluba, who mediates the Congolese conflict, urged all sides not to exploit Kabila's death in ways that could derail or delay the peace process in the DRC. He called on the signatories of the Lusaka Ceasefire Agreement to exercise maximum restraint and to allow the Congolese people, government, and Kabila's family to mourn peacefully. Reaffirming Zambia's neutrality, Chiluba said that his efforts to guide the peace process under the Lusaka framework would only intensify. He said he received the news of Kabila's assassination with "deep sadness", calling it a devastating loss for a nation that had been struggling unsuccessfully for peace and stability for two years. The circumstances surrounding the killing, he warned, also darkened the state of the rule of law on the African continent.

=== Angola ===
The Angolan government officially rejected claims of its involvement in Kabila's assassination, which had been made by "one of the rebel movements in the DRC". João Pedro, spokesperson for Angola's Ministry of External Relations, described the allegations as "pure, unfounded speculation" and emphasized that, as an ally of the Congolese government under SADC, Angola could not be complicit in the killing of a head of state it supports. He added that Kabila had long been an ally and any leadership change should come from the Congolese people, not Angola. Pedro also stressed that Angola respects the DRC's sovereignty, with its troops working alongside government forces to counter Ugandan and Rwandan incursions.

=== Liberia ===
Liberian President Charles Taylor suggested that influential actors were behind Kabila's assassination. His private radio station reported that during his first cabinet meeting of the year on 19 January, he remarked that the killing was tragic but clearly orchestrated by "powerful hands". Analysts in Monrovia interpreted his comments as an allusion to major global powers. Taylor added that Liberia was deeply concerned about the events in the Democratic Republic of the Congo.

=== Togo ===
The Togolese president Gnassingbé Eyadéma stated that the "assassination of President Laurent-Désiré Kabila has caused deep consternation and profound indignation among the Togolese people. We strongly condemn this heinous act and, on behalf of the Togolese people, their government, and in our own name, we extend our most heartfelt condolences to the bereaved family....The brotherly people of the Democratic Republic of the Congo must draw a lesson from the cruel mourning into which the tragic death of President Laurent-Désiré Kabila has plunged them...If the Congolese brothers were united, there would be no breach through which the enemy could enter to set them against one another through war". Eyadéma issued an urgent appeal for an end to the conflict and warned that its scale, destruction, and persistence alarmed the international community. Calling for inclusivity, he invited "Congolese people, regardless of their political views, ethnic affiliation, religion, region of origin, or alliances, to do everything possible to find a definitive solution to this conflict that has already lasted far too long".

=== Other countries ===
The United Kingdom and the United States urged the various factions involved in the conflict not to exploit the political uncertainty for their own gain. Peter Hain, Minister of State responsible for Africa, the Middle East, and South Asia, underlined the need for stability in the DRC, a turbulent yet resource-rich state. He remarked that the Lusaka Ceasefire Agreement remained the essential framework for restoring peace. U.S. diplomatic officials echoed these views. South African Deputy Foreign Minister Aziz Pahad observed that the latest developments only added to the instability already affecting the African Great Lakes region, while President Thabo Mbeki extended condolences to the Congolese government, its people, and the Kabila family. According to Foreign Affairs spokesperson Ronnie Mamoepa, the situation in Congo remained highly volatile, but the relative calm in Kinshasa's streets was reassuring, and no breaches of the 1999 Lusaka Ceasefire Agreement had been detected. He maintained that the peace foundations laid by the agreement were still intact. The Pan Africanist Congress of Azania described Kabila's assassination as a dire warning for the continent and urged the creation of an authentic regional security system capable of resolving conflicts, arguing that Africa needed a sincere conversation about the strategic interests at play in Congo. Botswana president Quett Masire, the OAU's appointed mediator for the Congo crisis, stated that Kabila's assassination had further complicated matters. Some sources reported that a Ugandan official suggested the political shift in Congo might bring positive developments.

=== Organization of African Unity ===
Salim Ahmed Salim, Secretary-General of the Organization of African Unity (OAU), denounced the assassination as "a tragic and senseless act", urging Congo's leaders and citizens to remain calm and show restraint. In an official communiqué, the OAU reported that Salim had received the news "with sadness and shock", calling the killing "a blatant breach of the principles contained in the OAU Charter". He expressed hope that the incident would not hinder ongoing efforts to achieve a durable, peaceful settlement in the DRC through the Lusaka Ceasefire Agreement, and he appealed to all parties in the conflict to recommit themselves to carrying out the terms of the Lusaka Ceasefire Agreement.

=== European Union ===
The European Union condemned the assassination and urged all Congolese parties to "work toward national reconciliation and the democratization of the country". It also called for calm and insisted that all signatories of the Lusaka Ceasefire Agreement "honor their commitments and comply with the relevant UN Security Council resolutions". The EU appealed for restraint and encouraged all actors to collaborate, "in word and deed", toward a peaceful settlement of the Congolese conflict. It reaffirmed its support for the DRC's territorial integrity and its commitment to helping ensure the full implementation of the Lusaka Agreement. It also urged Kinshasa's authorities to uphold the rule of law and guarantee the safety of all civilians on Congolese territory.

=== United Nations ===
United Nations Secretary-General Kofi Annan urged all sides involved in the conflict in the Democratic Republic of the Congo to pursue a peaceful settlement in the wake of the assassination, which had also shaken the country. In his message of condolence to the Kabila family and the Congolese government, Annan expressed his hope that the tragedy would neither derail the 17-month peace process nor heighten instability in the DRC and the wider African Great Lakes region. He stated, "I wish to reaffirm the United Nations' unwavering commitment to assisting in the search for lasting peace in the DRC".

=== Human Rights Watch ===
The U.S.-based human rights organization Human Rights Watch (HRW) urged the new Congolese authorities to investigate and hold accountable those responsible for crimes against humanity, assassinations, disappearances, and other acts of state terrorism targeting civilians. HRW emphasized that Kabila's death did not erase the atrocities committed under his rule, recalling that over 1.7 million Congolese had died as a result of the First and Second Congo Wars. The organization stressed that the president's death should serve as an opportunity to demand justice, protect the rights of all Congolese regardless of ethnicity or region, and ensure that human rights, such as freedom of expression, the press, and assembly, are respected. HRW also noted that in 1997, Kabila had obstructed a UN investigation into war crimes from the First Congo War and called on the United Nations Security Council to appoint a commission to resume investigations and examine subsequent war crimes committed by all parties. HRW statement accentuated that only ending hostilities, stopping foreign incursions, and withdrawing external forces could mitigate ethnic conflicts, which are worsening in South Kivu under Rwandan influence and in Ituri under Ugandan influence.

=== Africa–France Summit ===
The assassination overshadowed the 21st Africa–France Summit, which opened on 18 January 2001 at the Palais des Congrès in Yaoundé. Information about the killing was limited until the acting OAU chair, Togolese President Gnassingbé Eyadéma, asked delegates to observe a minute of silence. At least two heads of state canceled their participation: Congo-Brazzaville's Denis Sassou Nguesso and Zimbabwe's Robert Mugabe. Mugabe had already reached Yaoundé when the news emerged that Kabila had been flown to Harare, where his body was reportedly still being held. Kofi Annan, French President Jacques Chirac, and Eyadéma all honored Kabila's memory in their speeches to the gathering, recalling his participation in the previous Africa–France Summit at the Carrousel du Louvre in Paris, during which the countries affected by the Great Lakes conflict laid the groundwork for what would become the first phase of the Lusaka Ceasefire Agreement.

== In popular culture ==
Between 2009 and 2011, journalists Arnaud Zajtman and Marlène Rabaud researched and produced an investigative film about Kabila's killing with Al Jazeera. The film, titled Murder in Kinshasa, concludes that those convicted of Kabila's death are innocent, and that the assassination was in fact organized by Congolese rebel forces with the support of the Rwandan government, and approval of the United States.
