= Kabila =

Kabila may refer to:

== Places ==
- Kabila, Harju County, village in Saue Parish, Harju County, Estonia
- Kabila, Viljandi County, village in Põhja-Sakala Parish, Viljandi County, Estonia
- Tapong incl. Kabila, a village in Andaman & Nicobar Islands, India

== People ==
- Joseph Kabila (born 1971), former president of the Democratic Republic of the Congo (DRC)
- Jaynet Kabila (born 1971), daughter of Laurent-Désiré Kabila
- Laurent-Désiré Kabila (1939–2001), Joseph's father, the former president of the DRC
- Zoé Kabila (born 1979), politician, son of Laurent-Désiré Kabila
- Aimée Kabila Mulengela (1976–2008), alleged natural daughter of Laurent-Désiré Kabila
- Kabila (actor) - Bangladeshi actor
