= Palais de Marbre =

Coordinates: 4°21′50″S 15°15′02″E

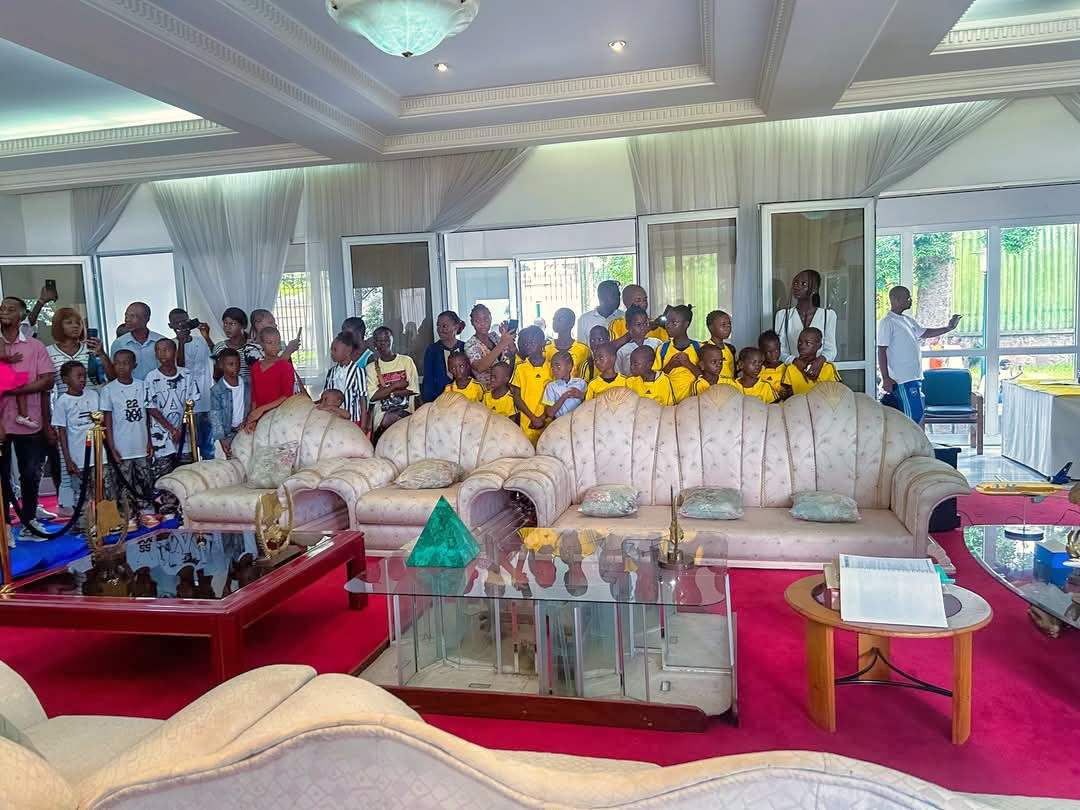
- Interior view
- Interactive map of the Palais de Marbre area
- Alternative names: Marble Palace

General information
- Architectural style: Hypermodern
- Location: Ngaliema, Kinshasa, Democratic Republic of the Congo
- Completed: 1970; 56 years ago
- Owner: Joseph Kabila

Design and construction
- Architects: Eugène Palumbo and Fernand Tala N'Gai

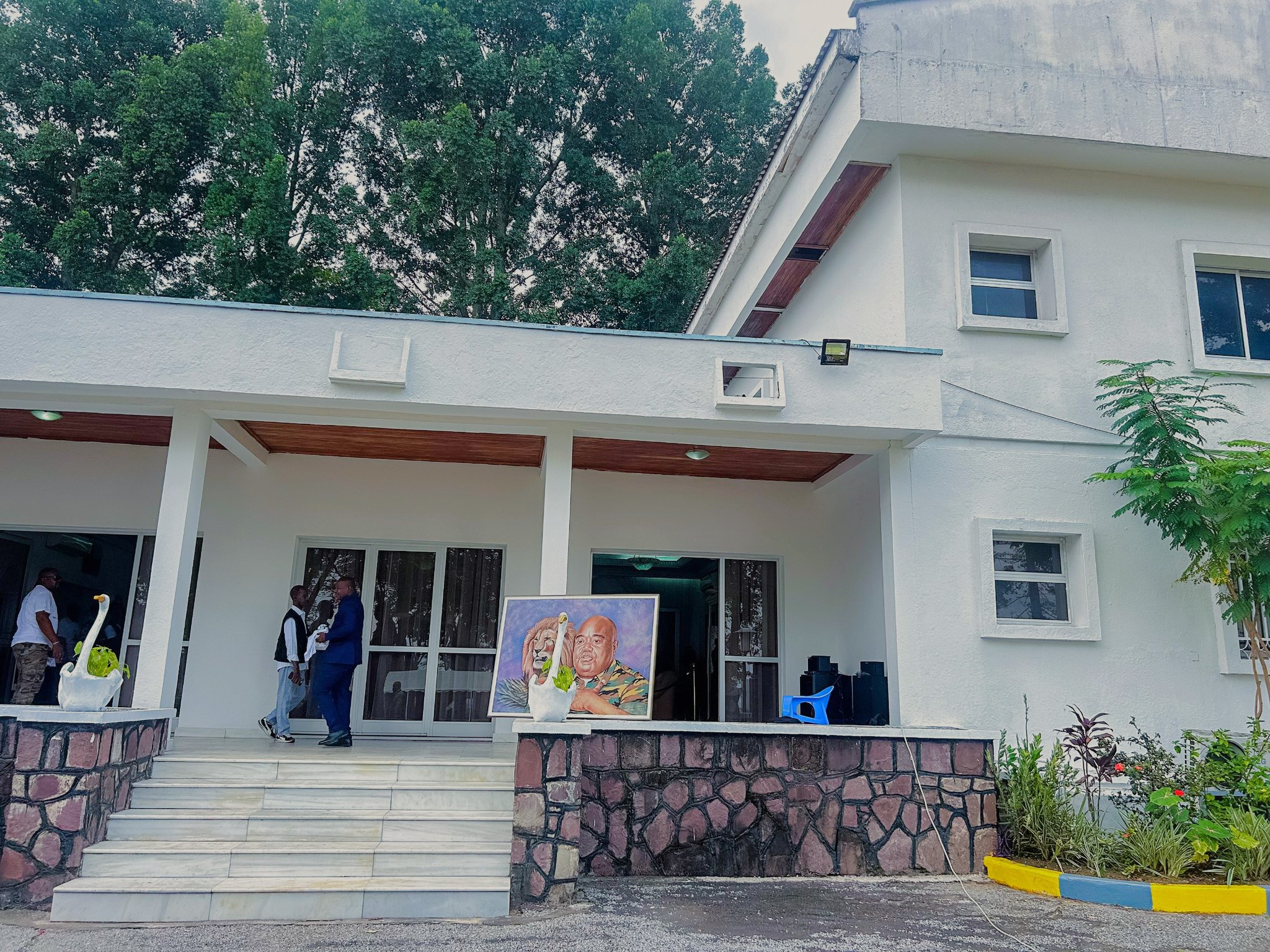
Exterior view

The Marble Palace (French: Palais de Marbre) is a palace and historic building in Kinshasa, Democratic Republic of the Congo. It is located on a hill in the commune of Ngaliema along Avenue Ma Campagne, a few miles from Mont-Fleury. The palace is used as a guest residence for certain official visits. It is also open to the public and contains an exhibition about the assassination of Laurent-Désiré Kabila.

== History ==
=== 1970–late 1970s: Construction and Mobutu's takeover ===
The Marble Palace was first built in 1970 after Albert Ndele Bamu, Governor of the National Bank of the Congo, commissioned its construction. The palace was first planned as his official residence on the Binza hills in Ngaliema, Kinshasa. It was designed by Eugène Palumbo and Fernand Tala N'Gai, the architects who also designed the Ministry of Foreign Affairs building and the Supreme Court. The palace featured a hypermodern circular design that incorporated sections of the surrounding gardens and prominently featured marble imported from an Italian quarry, with a statue of a prodigious lion at its main entrance. Because of its layout, the building was said to resemble the map of the Congo.

In September 1970, Ndele was appointed Minister of Finance, a move that was widely seen as a demotion, and he was dismissed the next year. Although the National Bank (renamed the National Bank of Zaire—Banque Nationale du Zaïre—after the country's name was changed to Zaire in 1971) continued to list the palace as its property, President Mobutu Sese Seko confiscated it and converted it into one of his opulent palaces. It also became a guesthouse for important visitors, including U.S. National Security Advisor Henry Alfred Kissinger during his visit in April 1976.

=== Late-1990s–present: Mobutu's fall and post-Laurent-Désiré Kabila era ===
The historic official residence of the Congolese head of state was situated on Mont Ngaliema. This presidential compound, however, was heavily looted in 1997 after the collapse of the Mobutu regime during the First Congo War. On 17 May 1997, troops from the Alliance of Democratic Forces for the Liberation of Congo (AFDL), which was composed of kadogos (child soldiers) and Rwandan Patriotic Army (RPA) soldiers led by Laurent-Désiré Kabila, entered Kinshasa. Mobutu fled to Morocco, where he died later that year. After taking control of the capital, the AFDL ordered residents of state-owned apartments to leave, often giving them only 1 hour to vacate. Once Mobutu was removed from power, Kabila moved into the Marble Palace.

On 16 January 2001, he was assassinated there by one of his own bodyguards. His son and successor, Joseph Kabila, chose not to live in the palace and instead settled in a villa known as GLM. The villa was named after Jean-Joseph Litho Moboti Nzoyombo Te Awe, Mobutu's uncle, who had received the property during the Zairianization period. According to Joseph Kabila's entourage, he later became the de facto owner of the property. However, legal claims surrounding GLM remain contested. The property is jointly owned and was first registered in the name of Belgian businessman William Damseaux through his company, Congo-Frigo, before part of it was sold to Litho Moboti. Legal representatives of the Moboti family argue that Joseph Kabila has no legal ownership or tenancy rights. He also took control of the "Gécamines residence", which had been intended for the Prime Minister, as well as the official residence of the President of the Legislative Council, located opposite the military officers' mess.

Nelson Mandela visited the Marble Palace on 13 February 2001 for talks with the newly sworn-in President Joseph Kabila. Years later, following the 2018 general elections, Félix Tshisekedi became president and officially took possession of the Palais de la Nation. Even so, the presidential villa previously occupied by Joseph Kabila remained under Kabila's control. Because of this, Tshisekedi stayed at the Kempinski Hotel on his first night as president before later relocating to the Cité de l'Union Africaine.

== Tourism ==
The Marble Palace is open to the public for two days a year: 16 January and 17 January, which are nationally recognized as "the days of the martyrs". These days are dedicated to the memory of two martyrs, Patrice Émery Lumumba, assassinated in Lubumbashi on 17 January 1961, and Laurent-Désiré Kabila, assassinated at the Marble Palace on 16 January 2001. The palace has preserved historical artifacts, including the bloodstained chair on which Laurent-Désiré Kabila was shot. It also exhibits a collection of photographs documenting his political journey, from his time in Les maquis to his eventual rise to power on 17 May 1997. Various works of art, honoring his legacy, also adorn the palace.
