= Gaëtan Kakudji =

Congolese journalist, activist and politician

Gaetan Kakudji

Governor of Katanga
- In office May 1997 – January 1998

Minister of the Interior
- In office 4 January 1998 – 4 April 2001
- Preceded by: Jeannot Mwenze Kongolo
- Succeeded by: Myra Ndjoku Manianga

Personal details
- Born: 3 October 1942 Ankoro, Katanga Province, Belgian Congo
- Died: 21 July 2009 (aged 66) Brussels, Belgium
- Occupation: journalist, politician

Gaetan Kakudji (3 October 1942 – 21 July 2009) was a Congolese journalist, activist and politician.

== Early years ==
Gaetan Kakudji was born in Ankoro, Katanga Province on 3 October 1942. He studied at the University of Louvain, where he obtained a degree in political, economic and social sciences. He worked as a journalist for the Brussels newspaper La Cité, and then for Radio-Television Belgium. He was a first cousin of Laurent-Désiré Kabila.

Through the 1970s and 1980s Laurent Désiré Kabila and a few companions lived in remote parts of the Congo outside the control of the government of Mobutu Sese Seko. Their PRP (parti de la révolution populaire) tried to implement Maoist ideas in areas they controlled. During this period Gaëtan Kakudji lived in Liège and represented the PRP in Belgium. He arranged contacts when the guerillas made secretive visits to Europe, including meetings with Pierre Galand and Anne-Marie Lizin when Kabila testified to the Russell Tribunal on the Congo at meetings in Rotterdam in 1982.

== Political career ==
Kakudji was appointed Deputy Secretary General and member of the Central Committee in charge of foreign policy and international relations of the PRP. He was appointed first Deputy Secretary General of the Alliance of Democratic Forces for the Liberation of Congo (AFDL). In 1996 Kakudji was living in Schaerbeek when he announced the formation of the AFDL, which was helped by Rwanda and Uganda in driving out Mobutu in May 1997. When Laurent-Désiré Kabila came to power, Kakudji was appointed governor of Katanga province.

During a cabinet reshuffle on 4 January 1998 Kakudji replaced Jeannot Mwenze Kongolo as Minister of the Interior (Internal Affairs). In August 1998 there were clashes with rebels near Kinshasa. Kabila was away from the city but Gaetan Kakudji, the Interior minister, was confident the last small pockets of rebels would soon be eliminated.

After Kabila was assassinated on 16 January 2001, Kakudji was a member of the emergency committee that decided to appoint his son Joseph Kabila to succeed him. He remained Minister of the Interior until 4 April 2001, when he was replaced by Myra Ndjoku Manianga. After leaving the government Kakudji remained influential behind the scenes. He was vice president of the Senate office in the October 2003 transition, and was elected a senator in 2006.

Gaetan Kakudji died in Saint Luc Hospital, Brussels on 21 July 2009 after being hospitalized for a week.

== Sources ==
- Braeckman, Colette (21 July 2009), "Kakudji: disparition d'un Tonton", Le Soir (in French)
- "Décès du sénateur congolais Gaëtan Kakudji", RTBF, 22 July 2009
- "Le sénateur Gaëtan Kakudji est mort ce mardi à Bruxelles", Radio Okapi, 21 July 2009
- Phythian, Nicholas (28 August 1998), "Fighting breaks out near capital as Kabila allies send more troops", Irish Times
- Research Directorate (18 December 2002), "A list of individuals who have occupied the office of the Minister of the Interior since the coming into power of Laurent-Désiré Kabila ...", Refworld, Canada: Immigration and Refugee Board of Canada
