= Emile Mota =

Democratic Republic of the Congo politician (born 1956)

Emile Christophe Mota Ndongo

Minister of Agriculture, fishery and livestock of Congo-Kinshasa
- In office 25 September 2015 – 15 December 2016
- President: Joseph Kabila
- Prime Minister: Augustin Matata Ponyo
- Preceded by: kabwe (Acting)

Personal details
- Born: Kolwezi, Congo-Léopoldville (now Congo-Kinshasa)
- Party: Alliance des forces democratiques du congo
- Education: University of Kinshasa

Emile Christophe Mota Ndongo (born 5 May 1956, Kolwezi, Democratic Republic of the Congo, or DRC) is a former minister of Agriculture, Livestock and Fishery of the DRC. He is also the acting president of Regional Fisheries Commission of the Gulf of Guinea, COREP, a member of the parliament of the DRC, and a former chief of cabinet of the late president of the Congo, Laurent-Désiré Kabila. He was born on the 5 May 1956 in the Katanga province.

== Career ==
Emile Mota is a professor at the University of Lubumbashi (UNILU) in Haut-Katanga Province. He lectures in economics and project management, in the department of economics in the Katanga (formerly Shaba), and he was the former economic adviser of the president of Katanga provincial parliament Gabriel Kyungu wa Kumwanza.

In 2000, he was approached by the late president of the DRC Laurent-Désiré Kabila, and he was appointed chief of cabinet in charge of the economy. He witnessed the killing of the president on 16 January 2001 while he was working with him.

In 2011, he became a Member of the national Parliament in Kinshasa. He was elected in the 2011 election for a five-year term. He is advocating for sustainable development and recycling practices. While in Parliament, he initiated a law project on subcontracting in the Democratic republic of the congo. In 2015, he was nominated Minister of Agriculture, livestock and fishery.
