= Richard Miniter =

American journalist

- Born: 1967 (age 58–59); New York City, New York, U.S.
- Occupations: Journalist, author
- Years active: 1990–present

Richard Miniter (born 1967) is an American investigative journalist, author and news entrepreneur. A former editorial writer and columnist for The Wall Street Journal in Europe, as well as a member of the investigative reporting team of The Sunday Times of London, he was the National Security columnist from 2011 to 2018. He has written three New York Times best-selling books, Losing bin Laden, Shadow War, Leading From Behind. His most recent book, Eyes On Target, was co written with Scott McEwen, the author of the best selling book American Sniper. Miniter's articles have appeared in Politico, The New York Times, The Washington Post, The Wall Street Journal, The Atlantic Monthly, Newsweek, The New Republic, National Review, and Reader's Digest.

== Family and education ==
Miniter was born in New York City and grew up in Rosendale, New York. Among his siblings are several writers and journalists, including Frank Miniter, executive editor of American Hunter magazine, and Brendan Miniter, formerly of The Wall Street Journal, who is the editor of the book The 4% Solution: Unleashing the Economic Growth America Needs.

He studied philosophy at Vassar College, graduating in 1990. He was an editor of the Vassar Spectator, one of the school's student periodicals, where he worked with Washington Post columnist Mark Thiessen and ABC News White House correspondent Jonathan Karl.

== Policy and early media work ==
In 1989, he was a summer fellow at the Institute for Humane Studies. He later worked as an environmental policy analyst at the Competitive Enterprise Institute. From 1992 to 1994, Miniter was an associate producer of the PBS talk show TechnoPolitics. In 1996, he produced a radio series profiling female executives and entrepreneurs, Enterprising Women, that was distributed to more than a hundred radio stations in the United States. He was also a fellow and senior editor of the Hudson Institute.

== Career in journalism ==
Miniter published in a number of newspapers, including The New York Times, The Wall Street Journal, The Washington Post, The Sunday Times (London), South China Morning Post, and Australian Financial Review. He travelled to South Sudan, Uganda and Kenya to write about modern-day slavery for The Atlantic Monthly in "The False Promise of Slave Redemption".

=== Dow Jones Newswires ===
Miniter worked for the Dow Jones Newswires during the summers of 1987 and 1988.

=== Wall Street Journal Europe ===
Hired by The Wall Street Journal editor Robert Bartley in 2000, Miniter was sent to Brussels as an editorial page writer at The Wall Street Journal Europe and editor of its weekly "Business Europe" column. He also wrote a weekly column, "The Visible Hand", for The Wall Street Journal's OpinionJournal.com.

=== Post-Journal ===
Miniter left the Journal he joined the investigative team of the Sunday Times (London), where he co-wrote the investigative series the Road to Ground Zero. That series, won an award from the International Consortium of Investigative Journalists.

=== The Washington Times ===
Miniter was the editorial page editor and Vice President of Opinion at The Washington Times from March until October 2009. Miniter later sued for breach of contract and other claims.

In September 2010, the case of Miniter v. Moon et al. and the related EEOC complaint was settled. Miniter refused to disclose the terms, but said "I am very, very happy with the equitable and just result."

=== Forbes and investigative journalist ===
Miniter wrote the "National Security" column for Forbes.com. Miniter's June 2014 Forbes exposé of President Joseph Kabila, the leader of the Democratic Republic of Congo, reportedly provoked Kabila's younger brother, Zoe, to beat unconscious Congo parliament speaker Évariste Boshab. The Kabila family accused Boshab of having been an anonymous source for Miniter's article, which estimated President Kabila had extracted and secreted away as much as $15 billion from the impoverished Congo.

Miniter wrote a regular national security column for Forbes.com. and wrote about the growing al Qaeda presence in Africa.

=== American Media Institute ===
In 2012, Richard Miniter founded the American Media Institute, a 501(c)(3) non-profit organization that provides investigative news stories to leading newspapers, magazines, radio and television news outlets around the world.

Richard Miniter's attendance at a controversial 2014 Passover dinner hosted by Israel's ambassador to the U.S. was revealed pursuant to an Israeli Supreme Court order in 2016. Ambassador Ron Dermer had fought media requests for information about the gathering, but the court rejected his argument that Israel's national security required the guest list to remain secret. Miniter was one of three American journalists present at the Seder, which was also attended by U.S. Secretary of State John Kerry.

== Books ==
=== The Myth of Market Share ===
Miniter's first book, The Myth of Market Share, was published in 2002 by Crown Publishing, an imprint of Random House. The book asserts that business strategy that focuses on increasing market share is wrong-headed and distracts from profit-seeking. According to a review by The Washington Post, the book "although at times repetitious ... makes it clear why there is zero correlation between profitability and market share."

=== Losing bin Laden ===
In 2003, Miniter's Losing bin Laden, was published. The book is the result of eighteen months of reporting from Khartoum, Cairo, Frankfurt, Hamburg, London, Paris, and Washington, D.C. It offers an account of United States policy relating to Al Qaeda and bin Laden during the Clinton administration. According to George Will,

Miniter suggests that the appointment of [Richard] Clarke on May 22, 1998, as the government's first coordinator of the counterterrorism efforts that were dispersed to 40 agencies, "could have been the beginning of the end of al Qaeda. But the lack of presidential leadership, government inertia and bureaucratic squabbling often got in the way."

It became a New York Times bestseller, peaking at number ten in September 2003. Losing bin Laden was cited on NBC's Meet the Press by host Tim Russert in an interview with Madeleine Albright. Steve Forbes praised the book, stating that Miniter "tapped an extraordinary array of sources to piece this sorry tale together." Miniter appeared on CNN in 2006 and disputed portions of ABC's miniseries The Path to 9/11, which included a scene depicting Clinton National Security Advisor Sandy Berger as failing to kill bin Laden when presented with the opportunity to do so. Miniter stated on the Situation Room program that "if people wanted to be critical of the Clinton years there's things they could have said, but the idea that someone had bin Laden in his sights in 1998 or any other time and Sandy Berger refused to pull the trigger, there's zero factual basis for that."

The Washington Times printed a critical reply to the book from Roger Cressey, a former member of the United States National Security Council staff during the Clinton administration, and Gayle Smith, who participated in the NSC as a Special Assistant to the President. Cressey and Smith characterized four specific allegations in the book as "erroneous," and questioned the veracity of Miniter's sources. Miniter's rejoinder was published with Cressey and Smith's criticism.

=== Shadow War ===
Miniter's next book was based on research in Iraq, Kuwait, Egypt, Sudan, Hong Kong, Singapore and the Philippines. Shadow War: The Untold Story of How America is Winning the War on Terror, became his second New York Times bestseller, debuting at number seven on the November 7, 2004 edition of the newspaper's non-fiction bestseller list.

=== Disinformation ===
Disinformation: 22 Media Myths That Undermine the War on Terror, was published by Regnery in 2005. Miniter traveled to Egypt, Sudan and corresponded with sources in Saudi Arabia, Pakistan, and Afghanistan while working on the book. Among other claims, Miniter asserts in the book that Osama bin Laden was not on dialysis.

=== Jack Bauer for President ===
Miniter edited a 2008 book entitled Jack Bauer for President: Terrorism and Politics in 24. Published by BenBella Books, the volume "addresses how much of the show [24] is realistic and what it has to say about modern politics and foreign policy in America's fight against terrorism."

=== Mastermind ===
Sentinel, a division of Penguin Group, published Miniter's 2011 book Mastermind about Khalid Sheikh Mohammed. In the book, Miniter examines his subject's childhood in Kuwait and Pakistan and his college education in the United States. He draws conclusions about Mohammed's involvement in such events as the killing of Meir Kahane, the kidnapping and killing of Daniel Pearl, and the September 11, 2001 attacks.

=== Leading from Behind ===
St. Martin's Press, published Leading From Behind: The Reluctant President and the Advisors Who Decide for Him in August, 2012, just as the 2012 presidential campaign entered its national phase. The book almost immediately became Miniter's third New York Times best seller.

Miniter was attacked by CNN national security analyst Peter Bergen. Miniter's book alleged that Obama was indecisive and delayed when action was needed on the attack of bin Laden, which brought Bergen to state "Miniter's account of the intelligence that led to bin Laden and the decision-making surrounding the operation that killed him is a pile of poppycock served up with heaps of hogwash". Responding to this, Miniter wrote to CNN saying that reporters rely too heavily on White House officials and Pakistani government officials, and marginalize those who were actually present during the hours and days after the operation, hence standing behind his account detailed in his latest book.

Publishers Weekly debuted Miniter's work as #13 on Week's Best Sellers in late August and discussed how Miniter's book received major press from publication through the election, appearance on Sean Hannity's television show and The Drudge Report, in addition to national television appearances, national radio shows, and so on.

=== Eyes On Target ===
Center Street, published Eyes on Target: Inside Stories from the Brotherhood of the U.S. Navy SEALs in February, 2014. This latest book, co-authored with Scott McEwen, chronicles the history and long standing traditions of the Navy SEALs and provides details on some of the key operations conducted by Navy SEALs such as Red Wings and the attack on the US Consulate in Benghazi.
