= Mwenze =

Mwenze is a DR Congolese surname. Notable people with the surname include:

- Jeannot Mwenze Kongolo (1960–2021), DR Congolese politician
- Willy Kalombo Mwenze (born 1970), DR Congolese long-distance runner
