= Jacques Nziza =

Major General Jack Nziza is Inspector-General of the Rwanda Defence Force. He has also served as Permanent Secretary of the Ministry of Defence.

André Kissasse Ngandu, founding member of the AFDL, the coalition that would bring down Mobutu Sese Seko as the President of Zaire in 1997, was assassinated on 6 January 1997. Disagreements within the AFDL leadership led to the killing. Nziza has been mentioned by a source close to Ngandu as the perpetrator of the assassination, ordered by AFDL Chairman Laurent-Désiré Kabila.
