= Jaynet Kabila =

Congolese politician

Member of the National Assembly
- Incumbent
- Assumed office 16 February 2012
- Constituency: Kalemie

Personal details
- Born: Jaynet Désirée Kabila Kyungu; 4 June 1971 (age 54) Hewa Bora, Maquis of Fizi (now Democratic Republic of the Congo)
- Party: Independent
- Spouse: Felix Wazekwa (m.2006 – 2011)
- Relations: Joseph Kabila (twin brother); Zoé Kabila (brother); Aimée Kabila Mulengela (alleged half-sister)
- Parent(s): Laurent-Désiré Kabila; Sifa Mahanya

Jaynet Désirée Kabila Kyungu (born 4 June 1971) is the daughter of Laurent-Désiré Kabila, the former president of the Democratic Republic of Congo and twin sister of Joseph Kabila, the former President. Kabila was elected as a member of the Parliament of the Democratic Republic of the Congo in 2011, the same year as her other brother Zoé Kabila. Document leaks in 2016 revealed that she is a part-owner of a major Congolese telecom company through offshore subsidiaries.

== Early life ==
Jaynet Kabila and her twin brother, Joseph Kabila were born on 4 June 1971 to Sifa Mahanya and Laurent-Désiré Kabila. Although her father would eventually become president of the country, at the time of Jaynet Kabila's birth, Laurent Kabila was a struggling rebel leader at the nadir of his power. The twins were born in Hewa Bora, a small village in the secessionist state of Maquis of Fizi, in the present-day province of South Kivu, in the eastern Democratic Republic of the Congo, but it has also been alleged that the twins were actually born in Tanzania.

== Career ==
Jaynet Kabila first became publicly prominent in 2011 when she was elected as a deputy to the Congolese National Assembly, representing Kalemie as an independent. After the death of Augustin Mwanke in 2012, President Joseph Kabila's right hand man, she became one of her brother's most influential advisors.

Despite her generally low profile, Kabila is a powerful figure in Congolese politics, as the owner of Congolese media conglomerate Digital Congo. and as of 2015 has been described as the most influential member of her brother's entourage.

In March 2024, Jaynet Kabila was interviewed by military intelligence, after a search at the headquarters of the foundation dedicated to his late father, Laurent-Désiré Kabila, in Kinshasa.

== Offshore holdings ==
On 3 April 2016, the Panama Papers investigative reporting project revealed that Kyungu hired Panamanian law firm Mossack Fonseca to create a company called Keratsu Holding Limited in Niue on 19 June 2001, just a few months after her brother became president. According to the documents released, Kyungu was a co-director of Keratsu Holding Limited with Congolese businessman Kalume Nyembwe Feruzi, the son of a close ally of Kyungu's father, Laurent-Désiré Kabila.

Keratsu Holding Limited owns a 19 percent stake in Congolese Wireless Network SPRL, which in turn has a 49 percent stake in Vodacom Congo SPRL.
