= Hypermodernism =

Hypermodernism may refer to:

- Hypermodernism (chess), a chess strategy which advocates controlling the center of the board with distant pieces rather than pawns
- Hypermodernism (art), a cultural, artistic, literary and architectural movement
- Hypermodernity, a deepening or intensification of modernity
