= Zerhouni (surname) =

Zerhouni is a surname. Notable people with the surname include:

- Elias Zerhouni (born 1951), Algerian-born American scientist, radiologist, and biomedical engineer
- Naoufel Zerhouni (born 1995), Moroccan footballer
- Yazid Zerhouni (1937–2020), Algerian politician
