= André Kisase Ngandu =

Congolese military officer

- Born: c. 1940s
- Died: January 1997; Near Goma, Zaire
- Military career
- Allegiance: Simba rebels National Council of Resistance for Democracy (CNRD) (Democratic Republic of the Congo) Alliance of Democratic Forces for the Liberation of Congo (AFDL)
- Service years: 1960s–1967 1990–1997
- Rank: General
- Nickname: "The German"
- Commands: CNRD; AFDL
- Conflicts: Congo Crisis; Simba rebellion; First Congo War †

André Kisase Ngandu (died January 1997) was a Congolese rebel leader. An insurgent in the Simba rebellion of the 1960s, he immigrated to East and later West Germany where he lived for many years. He resumed his rebel activity with Ugandan support in the 1990s and emerged as leader of the National Council of Resistance for Democracy (CNRD) which waged an insurgency in eastern Zaire (present-day Democratic Republic of the Congo).

In 1996, he agreed to unite his force with other opposition factions, forming the Alliance of Democratic Forces for the Liberation of Congo (AFDL), becoming one of its main commanders. A Congolese nationalist, Kisase wanted to overthrow not just Zairian dictator Mobutu Sese Seko, but also make the AFDL a force independent of foreign influence. The latter stance resulted in him falling into disfavor with Rwanda, one of the AFDL's main supporters. The Rwandans and Kisase's main rival within the AFDL, Laurent-Désiré Kabila, probably arranged his murder in rural eastern Zaire in January 1997.

== Biography ==
=== Early life, Simba rebellion, and CNRD insurgency ===
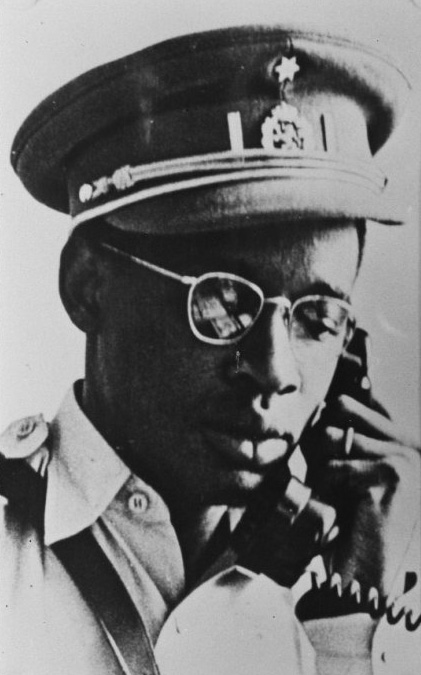
Kisase fought against Joseph-Desire Mobutu (pictured 1960), the later Mobutu Sese Seko, since the 1960s.

An ethnic Tetela, Kisase was born around the 1940s. A Congolese National Security document described him as the "little brother" of Nicholas Olenga. He took part in conflicts of the Congo Crisis in the 1960s, fighting as an insurgent in the Simba rebellion and rising to the rank of captain in the Simba forces. Meanwhile, Olenga became one of the Simbas' chief commanders. In 1965, the Simba uprising was mostly crushed by Armée Nationale Congolaise (ANC) troops commanded by Mobutu who consequently took power in the Democratic Republic of the Congo as dictator, eventually renaming it "Zaire". Kisase continued to resist Mobutu's rule as part of a Simba remnant force until 1967 when he and Olenga went into exile in Sudan. He reportedly helped to smuggle gold and ivory out of the Congo on behalf of the exiled rebel leadership. Olenga and another ex-Simba, Gaston Soumialot, subsequently sent Kisase to undergo military training in Egypt. Afterward, he relocated to live in Tanzania where he was activce in the Lumumbist opposition movement among the Congolese diaspora. In this role, he repeatedly visited Libya which financed and trained Congolese rebels.

Kisase eventually relocated to East Germany for military training before finally immigrating to West Germany where he earned a medical degree. At one point, he studied political science in Berlin. Kisase generally lived in Berlin during his exile in Germany. As a result of this background, he was nicknamed "The German" once he later returned to Zaire to lead a rebellion. Historian David Van Reybrouck described him as a nationalist in the Lumumbist tradition.

In 1990, Kisase resumed his rebel activity. He became the leader of a rebel group, eventually known as the National Council of Resistance for Democracy (Conseil National de Résistance pour la Démocratie, CNRD). The CNRD posed as armed wing of the MNC-L, a Congolese political party. In contrast, researcher Thomas Turner stated that the CRND was formed when Kisase broke away from a MNC-L splinter faction. Albert Onawelho Lumumba's London-based faction of the MNC-L later claimed that it had forged connections to Kisase during the latter's exile in Germany.

From 1990 to 1991, Kisase and 300 of his followers were trained by the Libyan secret service. When Libya was forced to close "terrorist" training camps under international pressure, Kisase relocated to Kampala, Uganda, (Note: The timing of Kisase's arrival in Uganda is disputed. According to his own statements, he returned to an unspecified African country in 1991. Researchers Philip Roessler and Harry Verhoeven claim that he ventured to Uganda in 1990, whereas Filip Reyntjens stated that he arrived in Uganda in early 1992.) to organize a new uprising against Mobutu. He cooperated with the Ugandan External Security Organisation, and had a good working relationship with Ugandan President Yoweri Museveni's government which granted him a safe house in Kampala. Kisase trained at Ugandan military academies for three years, while the CNRD began operating in the Rwenzori Mountains at the Ugandan-Zairian border from 1993 and occasionally attacked the Zairian Armed Forces (FAZ). Until 1996, he waged an insurgency against Mobutu with Ugandan and Libyan support. The Ugandans considered him a reliable ally, even though he maintained some distance to his patrons, wanting to keep his autonomy. In 1994, the Rwandan Civil War ended in a victory of the Rwandan Patriotic Front (RPF) rebel group, whereupon Kisase reportedly sent his fighters to Rwanda for further training.

By 1996, his group counted about 400 militants, and possessed a sympathizer network extending from Goma to Bunia. At the time, the Ugandans were training thousands more CNRD recruits. Museveni's government hoped to transform the CNRD into an intensely pro-Ugandan force within Zaire.

=== AFDL commander ===
In 1996, an international anti-Mobutu coalition began to emerge, with states and groups with widely diverging backgrounds and aims uniting to invade Zaire. Two states, Uganda and Rwanda, hoped to create a large Zairian/Congolese rebel force to aid this invasion. President Museveni recommended Kisase as one of the potential leaders of said force to Paul Kagame, the leading statesman of Rwanda. On 18 October 1996, Kisase and three others, namely Laurent-Désiré Kabila, Anselme Masasu Nindaga, and Déogratias Bugera, signed an agreement for their respective rebel/opposition groups to unite as the Alliance of Democratic Forces for the Liberation of Congo (Alliance des Forces Démocratiques pour la Libération du Congo-Zaïre, AFDL). The four AFDL leaders had little in common in regards to backgrounds, politics, and age. Accordingly, they mostly cooperated due to the pressure of their respective foreign supporters.

At the time of the rebel coalition's formation, Kisase was the only member of the newly formed AFDL high command who had any kind of substantial armed force and supporter network. However, his force was still too weak to form the AFDL's core; instead Tutsi militants and Banyamulenge militias formed the coalition's main fighting force. Kisase was appointed general, received training by the Rwandan Patriotic Army (RPA), and garnered a reputation as a strategist. As a result of his military experience, he was the most respected commander in the AFDL. Under Kisase's leadership, the AFDL managed to enlist some long-time Congolese rebels such as former FLC-L militants. After the AFDL invaded Zaire alongside its foreign allies, starting the First Congo War, he requisitioned a FAZ uniform with a blue beret he found, as the rebels lacked uniforms. By November 1996, he was based in Goma where he mainly focused on maintaining order and deal with violence and disorder caused by the Great Lakes refugee crisis.

Now we have to think for ourselves... Our main problems are how to use taxes, a fair administration and freedom for all of Zaire.

— André Kisase Ngandu, 20 November 1996

As time went on, Kisase became increasingly independent from his foreign sponsors. He began to critically address the future implications of foreign influence on the Congolese rebels, making his nationalistic stance clear. He wanted to transform the AFDL into a genuine Congolese liberation force instead of a proxy group for other states. His stance was strengthened by his frustration at being excluded from military and strategic decisions by the Rwandan officers, something about which he complained to them repeatedly. His rhetoric attracted many recruits, a large number of whom were suspicious of the AFDL's foreign supporters, most importantly Rwanda. This resulted in the Rwandan government starting to treat him with distrust; in contrast, AFDL spokesman Kabila took the opposite position, generally behaving "subservient" to the Rwandans and thus positioning himself as their favorite. At the same time, Kabila began to sideline the three other AFDL leaders, posing as future President of Zaire to their objections.

Military situation of the First Congo War in December 1996: AFDL in blue and Zaire in green.

When the AFDL and its foreign allies began to push the FAZ back and take territory in eastern Zaire, tensions between Kisase and the Rwandans further worsened. He publicly opposed the widespread looting by the RPA. On one occasion, he prevented the RPA from taking an electric generator from Goma Airport, arguing that it belonged to the Congolese state; this incident consequently became "famous". His speeches also became more and more critical of the Rwandans, with him calling their actions "Tutsi colonialism".

=== Assassination ===
The "most authoritative accounts" of the First Congo War claim that Kisase was ultimately murdered by the RPA. According to these accounts, once the AFDL had secured a foothold in Zaire and consolidated, the Rwandan leadership moved to eliminate Kisase. They asked him to deal with the growing resistance by Mai-Mai militias which opposed the presence of both pro-FAZ as well as pro-AFDL forces on their lands. Historian Gérard Prunier argued that this request was "with some irony" based on his reputation as a nationalist. Kisase agreed to venture to Butembo; shortly before the trip, his bodyguards were replaced with some who had previously served with Kabila. Despite this development, he still took the mission, and was murdered on 4, 6, 7, or 8 January. His body and that of a bodyguard were later found at a road near Goma. Based on the account of a rebel officer, The Washington Post stated that he was shot by "Rwandan Tutsi troops". The Ugandan government concurred, claiming that Rwanda had murdered him to remove "competition". Ugandan intelligence officers accused the Rwandan Directorate of Military Intelligence of having organized the assassination. Van Reybrouck, Philip Roessler, and Harry Verhoeven stated that Kabila was involved in or condoned the murder. According to Filip Reyntjens, "someone close to the victim" maintained that the murder was ordered by Kabila and carried out by RPA Major Jack Nziza.

Many AFDL officers never accused Rwanda of the murder, instead implicating Kabila alone or an actual Mai-Mai attack. However, Kabila lacked loyal men to carry out the assassination on his own at the time.

=== Legacy ===
On 17 January, Kabila publicly lied that Kisase had been wounded by the Mai-Mai, claiming that he would soon return to active service. The Rwandans even ordered the Makerere University Hospital to make room for Kisase, so that he could be treated there. Later on, it was alleged that he had been killed in an ambush at Beni. The murder remained unsolved, partially due to Kabila having no intention to clear up the removal of his political rival.

Kisase's demise weakened Uganda's influence on the AFDL, while improving the relative importance of two other AFDL leaders: Kabila and Masasu. Ultimately, Kabila emerged as the strongest figure among the rebels. Following the fall of Mobutu's regime, Kabila became President of the Democratic Republic of the Congo. In 1999, MNC-L leader Albert Onawelho Lumumba demanded that Kabila clear up his involvement in the murder of leading Lumumbists including Kisase.

Kisase's family was still living in Germany as of the early 2000s.
