= Maquis of Fizi =

Breakaway state in Africa (1967–1986)

- 1967–1986
- Flag
- Anthem: (Note: The nation had an anthem, but Cosma does not state if it had a title.)
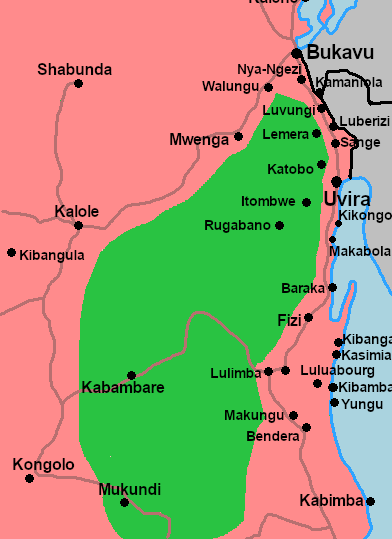
- Approximate map of control by Kabila's Maquis of Fizi from 1967-1986
- Status: Unrecognized rival government and Maquis
- Capital: Hewa Bora (also spelt Ewabora)
- Official languages: Swahili
- Common languages: Ibembe
- Ethnic groups: Mostly Bembe, some Banyarwanda and 1% foreign born populations of unknown origin
- Religion: None (secular state)
- Demonym: Congolese (Note: The rebels rejected the name change to Zaire, continuing to refer to the country as the Congo and its people Congolese.)
- Government: Maoist one-party socialist republic
- President of the Republic (Note: Kabila also held the positions of President of the People's Assembly, Supreme Commander of the FAP (army), and Foreign Affairs Minister)
  - 1967–1986: Laurent-Désiré Kabila
- Legislature: People's Assembly
- Historical era: Cold War
  - Established: 24 October 1967
  - Disestablished: 1 July 1986
- Currency: Tanzanian shilling (TZS); Zaïre (ZRN)
Preceded by	Succeeded by
People's Republic of the Congo (Stanleyville)	Zaire

The Maquis of Fizi (French: maquis de Fizi) was a Maoist Maquis and rival government led by Laurent-Désiré Kabila that was based in Fizi Territory, Republic of the Congo (later Zaïre, now Democratic Republic of the Congo) between 1967 and 1986. Of the several maquis established following the end of the Simba rebellion, the maquis was the most well-organized, having been established following months of ideological and some military training undertaken by Kabilia in Nanjing, China, where he authored The Seven Errors, a critique of the Lumumbist rebellion.

Although it was completely unrecognized internationally, it enjoyed some aid and assistance from Maoist China as it adopted policies similar to Maoist doctrine. It dissolved in 1986 when its weapon supplies ran thin, informants and spies caused chaos in government, and the territory began to run out of resources to extract. Kabila escaped all the way to Uganda, being found there in the tail-end of the 1980s, eventually leading a Ugandan-backed revolt against the Zairian government.

== Background ==
In 1963, followers of Patrice Lumumba, who had been ousted from power in 1960 by Joseph Kasa-Vubu and Joseph-Désiré Mobutu and subsequently killed in January 1961 in Katanga, launched a series of rebellions across the Republic of the Congo. The first erupted in Kwilu under Pierre Mulele, followed by an uprising in eastern Congo led by Christophe Gbenye and Gaston Soumialot. Laurent-Désiré Kabila went to Brazzaville to contact the Conseil National de Libération (CNL), a group of rebel leaders, where he became Soumialot's deputy and, in January 1964, traveled to eastern Congo to launch the rebellion in North Katanga.

There, Kabila quickly rose through the ranks of the rebellion, becoming vice president of the eastern section of the CNL, and later, Secrétaire d’État aux Affaires Étrangères du gouvernement du C.N.L. et ministre plénipotentiaire en Tanzanie, Kenya et Ouganda. He eventually assumed leadership of the rebel front in Fizi Territory, which bordered North Katanga, with its headquarters at the base in Kigoma, Tanzania, which facilitated the supply of arms from China via Dar es Salaam. As Belgian and United States-backed government counter-offensives gradually severed Simba external supply routes, his rebel area became one of the few remaining sources of money and arms for the movement.

During this time, Kabila developed gradually from a Lumumbist into a Maoist, gaining a profile as an educator and ideologue. In 1965, he met Che Guevara, who had arrived with a Cuban expeditionary force to aid the rebels. Kabila, who had been highly praised and simultaneously envied as an "intellectual", appealed more to Guevara than Soumialot, though he was unaware of Kabila's limitations as a military leader. According to Cuban accounts, which were generally critical of the Simbas, Kabila was a young and inexperienced figure more interested in spending time with women, drinking, and gave priority to his ties with Tanzanian officials in Kigoma. Nonetheless, Guevara believed that Kabila had the potential to become a genuine and capable revolutionary leader, if circumstances permitted.

Following the capture of the city of Fizi by government forces, the rebel leaders went into exile, mostly in Tanzania. Kabila undertook ideological and some military training in Nanjing, China, between March and October 1966, where he authored The Seven Errors, a critique of the Lumumbist rebellion. The first error, he argued, was the lack of clear political education. Second, the rebels had placed too much reliance on external support and advice. Third, they waged a war without a clear purpose or understanding of their enemy. They rushed to take the major cities and mistreated civilians, forgetting to first occupy the small villages and collaborate with the peasants and workers to advance the revolution. Fourth, the rebellion was marred by tribalism and sectarianism. Fifth, they fought for personal power and glory. Sixth, they failed to establish mutual understanding between the fighters and the masses. Seventh, they neglected to form a revolutionary party.

In 1967, the exiled rebel leaders began preparations to reorganize, strengthen, and launch a new revolution to overthrow the government in Kinshasa. Kabila sought to coordinate with General Shabani Mahulani Ndalo, who was in Rumonge, Burundi, and loyal to Soumialot and the MNC/L, to form a single revolution capable of achieving their common goal, but they were unable to reconcile their differences. Kabila sought a Marxist-Leninist revolution and the creation of a socialist state, while Soumialot and his allies remained committed to the Lumumbist nationalism of the Simba Rebellion.

Around July, Ndalo re-entered Congo through the Kiliba Gap, settling first in the Kitoka Mountains and later in the Lulambwe mountains, above Mboko, where he established his headquarters. Kabila followed on October 24, arriving with a small force of just sixteen men, three revolvers, and three close associates, crossing Lake Tanganyika from Kigoma to Kibamba. He was warmly welcomed by the populations of Ngandja and Lulenge, frustrated with the rebellion's failure and overwhelmed by the administrative and military harassment. Taking advantage of his familiarity with the Bembe of Lulenge, Ngandja, and Itombwe, Kabila organized a maquis in Fizi Territory as a democratic and socialist state. At that time, the government had a simple organizational structure, with President Kabila at the top, followed by close associates 1st Vice-President Yumbu Gabriel, Second Vice-President Masengo Ildephonse, and Secretary General Umba Jeanson.

== History ==
=== Consolidation ===
On 7 December 1967, Kabila convened a mini-congress at Makanga-Tubaone, attended by both combatants and civilians, where he outlined the seven errors in Swahili. To address the shortcomings, Kabila established both civil and military administrations, implemented revolutionary education, and political training. He emphasized that the revolution would proceed through a combination of guerrilla and political warfare. Fighters were to live in the forests, undergoing daily training and drills, and then raise awareness and integrate the peasants of the surrounding area, whom Kabila regarded as better suited for a revolution than the bourgeoisie-corrupted urban population.

On 24 December 1967, having linked up with mostly Bembe Simba remnants in the area, Kabila and his followers created the Party of the People's Revolution (PRP), a Maoist politico-military movement with the goal of turning the Congo into a socialist country. The leaders of the four remnant groups were Kilenga Saleh, Kasmu Robert, Caliste Majaliwa, and Abuci Saleh respectively. The PRP worked to convince local leaders that life under a socialist system would be more just and equitable, promising an end to poverty, equal access to the country's wealth, the elimination of taxes, freedom from military harassment, among other things, depending on the social class of the people spoken to. Several villages joined the movement, with some families relocating entirely into PRP-held areas, which helped the group rapidly expand its ranks. Soon, through a combination of political and military conquest, the territory of the Maquis came to encompass most of the Fizi territory, as well as parts of Mwenga Territory, Shabunda Territory, Kabambare Territory, Nyunzu Territory, Kalemie Territory, and Kasongo Territory.

Another congress was held in Makanga-Tubaone from 21 to 25 January 1968, where the territory of the maquis, called the Red Zone, was divided into four military regions, each with levels of popular administration. In practice, however, the civil administration concentrated in the capital of Hewa Bora (also spelt Ewabora) and in the agricultural cities.

Within the party, many Maoist principles would be enacted; party cadres would function as ideal members of society and representatives of the Party, women's and youth divisions would be created to further instill revolutionary values into the population, and political commissars would be appointed for the Fizian army.

=== Decline and collapse ===
This operation had singlehandedly caused immense distrust around Kabila by his cadres and had sown the seeds of collapse into Fizi. Starvation and isolation in the Red Zone had also meant immense difficulties for the average Fizian by this time. Other mistakes included the movement of loyal troops to Lake Tanganyika's coast, resulting in even less security for the capital of Fizi.

A small civil war thus broke out, resulting in the collapse of the Zone and Kabila's fleeing to Uganda. The Red Zone was thus almost entirely occupied by Zairian soldiers by the end of 1986.

== Economy ==
In 1982, a reporter for the Ugandan New African magazine reported that the guerrillas had established rudimentary social and economic infrastructure.

== Government ==
=== Central government ===
At the founding of the state, the government had a simple organizational structure, with President Kabila at the top, followed by 1st Vice-President Yumbu Gabriel, 2nd Vice-President Masengo Ildephonse, and Secretary General Umba Jeanson. Kabila later assumed the positions of President of the PRP, President of the People's Assembly, Supreme Commander of the FAP (army), and Minister of Foreign Affairs. The vice-presidential positions were abolished following the deaths of Gabriel and Ildephonse. The position of Secretary General was retained within the Central Committee.

Below the president was the Revolutionary Military Commission, chaired by the Supreme Commander of the FAP. This body oversaw all military policy and included two other permanent members: Majaliwa Caliste, Chief of Political Staff, and Kanambe Adrien, Chief of Military Staff. They could invite two members of the PRP Central Committee to participate in its meetings.

The Central Committee of the PRP was composed of 35 members and included a Standing Committee led by Mufaya Léonard. He was assisted by Administrative Secretary General Mwilikwa Omari and Deputy Secretary General Chamalenge-Kibwe Jean-Marie. The Central Committee was responsible for shaping party policy, directing political and ideological training, promoting the ideals of the PRP, devising strategies to strengthen party influence at all levels, and evaluating the loyalty and commitment of party members. Léonard oversaw various specialized branches of the party, each led by its own director.

The law-making body of the government was the People's Assembly, presided over by Kabila, who held the authority to convene its sessions. Judicial bodies were tasked with enforcing the laws enacted by the Assembly.

The administration within the maquis was supervised by Malaka Baudouin and organized into several departments:

1. Department of Internal Affairs: Malaka Baudouin
2. Department of Economy: Kakozi Saleh
3. Department of Foreign Affairs: Laurent-Désiré Kabila
4. Department of Finance and Public Treasury: Kamimbi David
5. Department of Justice: Mangaza Efrazie
6. Department of Education, Health, and Social Affairs: Mwati Joseph
7. Central Supply Bureau: Dewambele Sungura
8. Workers' Bureau: Mutchungu Jérôme
9. Department of Propaganda: Kilenga Saleh
10. Department of Transport and Liaison: Mukendi Zakaria
11. State Security: Bisagiro Jeannot
12. Port Commander: Talama Onesphor
13. Military Base: Asani Bruno

=== Local government ===
The administration was structured with the capital at the top, followed by the military regions, districts, cities, communes, neighborhoods of cities, neighborhoods of agricultural cities, chiefdoms, and villages. In practice, however, this full administrative structure did not persist. Repeated attacks forced civilians loyal to the rebel government to retreat deeper into the forest, while rebel fighters established camps in strategic locations to protect them. As a result, only the capital, military regions, agricultural cities, and villages were used as administrative units until the 1980s.

The territory was divided into four military regions:

1. Rome, encompassing Fizi Territory and parts of Kalemie and Nyunzu territories, led by Col. Paul Jean
2. Reselt, encompassing part of the Mwenga Territory, led by Col. Ishilingi Yernard
3. Rosse, encompassing the Kabambare Territory, led by Col. Tumba Jérôme
4. Rock, encompassing part of the Kasongo Territory, led by Col. Maboko Simon

In addition to these military regions and the capital of Ewabora, there existed a coastal territory on Lake Tanganyika known as Bulubu, led by Col. Kayumba Sébastien. Although nominally part of Rome, Bulubu was directly dependent on the presidency and served as the port of entry, housing the customs and immigration services of the government.

The agricultural cities were overseen by city prefects. The central government institutions were also present at this level, represented through councils, committees, or sometimes by individual officials, as was the case with various departments.

== Symbols ==
To provide legitimacy, the PRP created its own flag, anthem, and a repertoire of slogans. The flag featured a red background, symbolizing the majority of the Congolese who were impoverished, subjugated, and exploited. It contained a yellow star, representing the nation's wealth, and a hammer and hoe, symbolizing the peasants and workers. The anthem was sung in Swahili:

Mapiganoya wanao dhulumiwa

PRP - hii ni mwanga, wa wakulima, na wafanyakazi, pia wanyonge wote.

Hatuna budi kufyeka unyonyaji na kuunda jamii la uja maa, nadhiri yetu kweli kushindwa muhali.

TAYARI - nguvu zetu zimoja silaha tumeshika mikononi, chama hiki cha umma ni nguvu ya umma. LENGO lake lote, unyonyaji mbali, ma pigano yetu yana dai haki. Kwa vyo vyote vile ubapari chini, kwa wanyonge wote mapinduzi njia. AZIMA lake kubwa umma utawale.

== Foreign relations ==
The maquis was willing to accept foreign aid to help ensure the success of its revolution, provided that the assistance came without conditions. It did not want foreign countries to impose their policies on it, as the policies of the PRP were tailored to the realities of the Congo, not theirs. Additionally, they refused to reveal their true positions to external allies as they were already aware of who their real friends were and wanted to benefit from as much aid as possible.

The maquis received support from Tanzania and Burundi, both of which provided supplies and harbored rebel bases. Some assistance also came from Maoist China. Tanzania was their main supplier, furnishing the rebels with equipment and basic necessities. In exchange, the maquis exported ivory, leopard skins, and large quantities of gold.

The support from China dried up with Mobutu's visit to China on 10 January 1973. Tanzanian support ended following the arrest of First Vice-President Yumbu Gabriel, who was executed by Zairean secret services in Tanzania. Tanzania, seeking to maintain good relations with Zaire, abandoned the rebels.

== See also ==
Simba rebellion

== Works cited ==
- Cosma, Wilungula B.; Vellut, Jean-Luc (1997). Fizi, 1967-1986: le maquis Kabila (in French). Bruxelles : Paris: Institut africain CEDAF ; Harmattan. ISBN 978-2-7384-5961-9.
- van Walraven, Klaas (31 March 2020). The Individual in African History: The Importance of Biography in African Historical Studies. BRILL. doi:10.1163/9789004407824_012. ISBN 978-90-04-40781-7.
- Kisangani, Emizet Francois; Bobb, Scott F. (2009-10-01). Historical Dictionary of the Democratic Republic of the Congo. Lanham, Md: Bloomsbury Publishing PLC. ISBN 978-0-8108-6325-5.
