= Eddy Kapend =

Congolese military officer

Eddy Kapend is a Congolese military officer who served as aide-de-camp to presidents Laurent-Désiré Kabila and Joseph Kabila until 2001. He was also briefly the chief of staff of the Congolese Armed Forces in 1998. In 2001, Kabila was assassinated by Rachidi Kasereka in his office, and Kapend killed Rachidi minutes later. In a trial widely criticized by international human rights organizations, Kapend and 80 others were convicted of participation in Kabila's killing and were sentenced to death. Released on January 8 by presidential pardon, he was exceptionally appointed by the current president of the Democratic Republic of Congo, Félix Tshisekedi, as brigadier general commander of the army in the province of Haut-Katanga on October 19, 2023. A 2011 investigative film, Murder in Kinshasa, reviewed the evidence that Kapend was not involved in Kabila's killing.

After Kabila was killed, Justice Minister Mwenze Kongolo and Kapend reported that Kabila had named his son Joseph as successor should Kabila die in office.

In 2021, President Félix Tshisekedi released Kapend from prison on humanitarian grounds.

In August 2024, Eddy Kapend was promoted to the rank of brigadier general in an army reshuffle.
