= Deputy Prime Minister of Algeria =

Deputy Prime Minister of Algeria is an extra-constitutional position within the Algerian government. The first to hold this office was Noureddine Yazid Zerhouni in 2010, and the last was Ramtane Lamamra in 2019. Since then, the position has remained vacant to this day.

== List of deputy prime ministers ==
Image	Name	Took office	Left office	Prime Minister
Vacant position (1962-2010)
	Yazid Zerhouni	28 May 2010	3 September 2012	Ahmed Ouyahia
Vacant position (2012-2019)
	Ramtane Lamamra	13 March 2019	2 April 2019	Noureddine Bedoui
Vacant position (2019-Present)

== See also ==
- Prime Minister of Algeria
- List of heads of government of Algeria
- Vice President of Algeria
- Politics of Algeria
