= Myra Ndjoku Manianga =

Democratic Republic of the Congo politician

Myra Ndjoku Manianga is the Minister of the Interior of the Democratic Republic of the Congo. He studied at the University of Nanterre in France. He was Secretary General of the State Security Committee. He is from Kasai-Occidental. He became minister in 2001.

== Sources ==
- https://web.archive.org/web/20041024131429/http://www.un.int/drcongo/disc14/0000001b.htm
