= Murder in Kinshasa =

2011 investigation film of Laurent-Désiré Kabila's death

Murder in Kinshasa is a 2011 Al Jazeera investigative film suggesting that Congolese president Laurent-Désiré Kabila was assassinated in 2001 through the efforts of the Rwandan government, with the backing of the United States. According to the film, international disputes over mineral and natural resources led to Kabila's assassination. The film argues that Eddy Kapend and the dozens of guards who were convicted and sentenced to death — in a trial criticized by human rights organizations — played no part in Kabila's death. Murder in Kinshasa was directed and edited by journalists Arnaud Zajtman and Marlène Rabaud.

In 2021, Étienne Tshisekedi's son, Congolese president Félix Tshisekedi, released Kapend and 23 others from prison for what they said were humanitarian reasons.

== Assassination of Laurent Kabila ==
On January 16, 2001, Kabila was gunned down in his office by one of his bodyguards and former child soldier Rashidi Mizele. Rashidi was immediately killed by Kapend, who was a close military advisor to Kabila. During a trial held in a military court, Kapend and more than 80 others were convicted of organizing the assassination of Kabila and were sentenced to death. Zajtman has written that the convictions had no evidence to support them, and that those convicted were given no right to appeal. Historian Thomas Turner has described their trial as "shambolic", and it was condemned by human rights organizations including Amnesty International.

Kabila was killed in the midst of the Second Congo War, a conflict that claimed the lives of 5.4 million people between 1998 and 2003. Massacres and rapes were common phenomena in the war and overshadowed the convictions for Kabila's killing.

== Investigation ==
Journalists Zajtman and Rabaud began an investigation into Kabila's assassination after Congo and Rwanda signed a peace agreement in 2009. According to Zajtman "it is an open secret that those condemned are innocent" in the Congo. Zajtman and Rabaud concluded that Kabila's killer, Rachidi, was only one man in a larger plot that included the Rwandan government, a Lebanese diamond merchant whose business had recently been terminated by Kabila, and the tacit approval of the United States.

According to Zajtman, 50 Congolese people convicted of Kabila's killing remained imprisoned, but were innocent of involvement in his death. In January 2021, Congolese president Felix Tshisekedi — released Kapend and 23 others from prison. According to a justice minister, their release did not erase their criminal records and was enacted for humanitarian reasons.

== Allegations of Rwandan involvement ==
Kabila had come to power, overthrowing the US-backed dictatorship of Mobutu Sese Seko, with the support of the Rwandan government. Murder in Kinshasa summarizes allegations that Kabila was in fact murdered by supporters of the rebel faction Rally for Congolese Democracy (RCD), in a plot organized by Rwanda. According to Zajtman and Rabaud, the motive for Rwanda was the weakening of the DRC's government, and Rwanda's continued exploitation of the DRC's mineral and natural resources.

A former justice minister in Congo told RFI in 2012 that Rwandan government involvement in Kabila's murder was "absolutely clear". Mwenze Kongolo, Kabila's minister of justice, has said that those convicted of killing Kabila were scapegoats. Political scientist Filip Reyntjens has written that Rwandan intelligence officers confirmed the government's role in organizing the assassination.

== Allegations of American involvement ==
Murder in Kinshasa presents evidence suggesting that the United States consulate in the Congo was at least aware of the plot to kill Kabila. In 2012, a former Congolese justice minister said that the American government was involved in Kabila's murder. Historian Thomas Turner writes that both Rwanda and the United States came to view Kabila as an impediment to the future of the DRC.
