= Child soldiers in the Democratic Republic of the Congo =

During the first and second civil conflicts which took place in the Democratic Republic of the Congo (DRC), all sides involved in the war actively recruited or conscripted child soldiers, known locally as kadogos which is a Swahili term meaning "little ones". In 2011 it was estimated that 30,000 children were still operating with armed groups. The United Nations Organization Stabilization Mission in the Democratic Republic of the Congo (MONUSCO), released a report in 2013 which stated that between 1 January 2012 and August 2013 up to 1,000 children had been recruited by armed groups, and described the recruitment of child soldiers as "endemic".

Former president Laurent-Désiré Kabila used children in the Second Congo War from 1996 onwards and it is estimated that up to 10,000 children, some aged only seven years old, served under him. Kabila was assassinated by one of his former child soldiers during the Second Congo War in 2001.

The International Criminal Court (ICC), in the first trials held on human rights violations in the DRC, led to the first indictments, the first trials and the first convictions, in national jurisprudence for the use of children in combat.

== Background ==
It is estimated in the academic literature that up to 300,000 children form a part of both irregular, and regular armed forces worldwide, and that this number is increasing. In Africa it is estimated that up to 120,000 children, which is 40 percent of the worldwide total, are currently used as combatants or support personnel. Africa has the highest growth rate in the use of children in conflict, and on average, the age of those enlisted is also receding. In 2003 it was estimated that up to 30,000 children were used as soldiers in the DRC, with children making up to forty percent of some militias.

In 1989 The United Nations passed the Convention on the Rights of the Child. Article 38 states that "State parties shall take all feasible measures to ensure that persons who have not attained the age of 15 years do not take a direct part in hostilities." The optional protocol on the involvement of children in armed conflict came into force in 2002 which stipulates that state actors "shall take all feasible measures to ensure that persons below the age of 18 do not take a direct part in hostilities and that they are not compulsorily recruited into their armed forces." The DRC is a signatory of both of these agreements. The official stance taken by UNICEF is that the use of children in armed conflicts is that it is morally reprehensible and illegal.

== State reaction ==
On 19 March 2006, Major Jean-Pierre Biyoyo was sentenced to five years in prison for recruiting and training child soldiers, it was the first time that a court in the DRC had tried, and convicted a soldier for child recruitment.

== International reaction ==
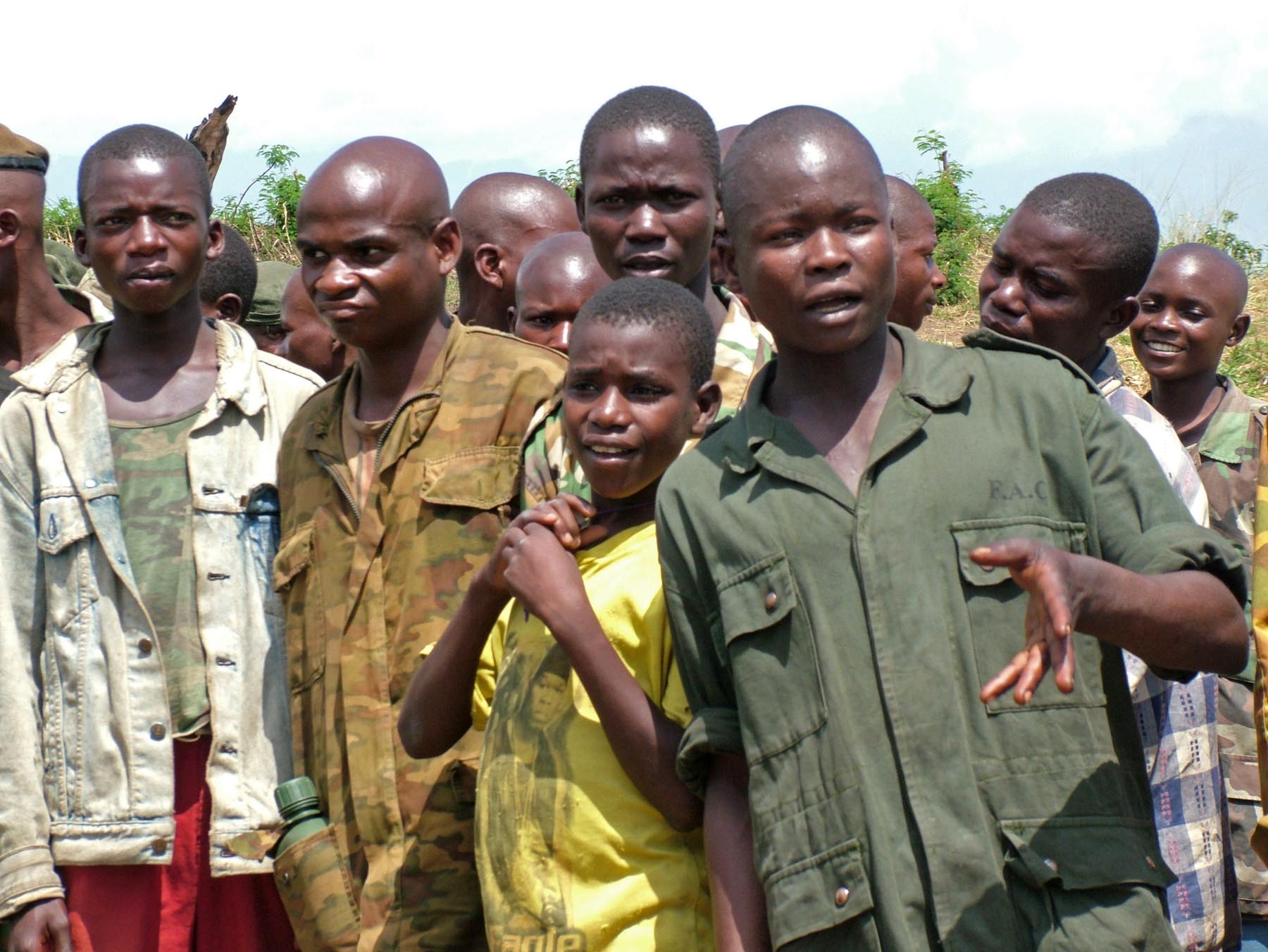
A group of demobilized child soldiers in the DRC

According to David M. Rosen, criticism has been levelled at the US over its support to nations which do recruit children into their armed forces. To comply with the Child Soldiers Protection Act (CSPA) in 2009 the State Department listed six nations that should be subject to sanctions under the act: Burma, Chad, the DRC, Somalia, Sudan and Yemen. On 25 October 2009, Barack Obama waived the restrictions on four of the six nations. As justification for this Obama stated that the nations involved were important in that they cooperated with interests essential to US foreign policy. The reason given for the DRC exemption was "a need to continue defense reform services and to influence the negative behaviour patterns of the military into a non-political professional force respectful of human rights." Obama also said that all four of these nations were making advances in the elimination of the use of children. However in the DRC child recruitment may actually be on the increase.

A report by MONUSCO confirmed that all parties to the conflict were recruiting girls as child soldiers, and that these children were frequently raped, or used as sex slaves or bush wives by groups such as the Union of Congolese Patriots (UPC) and Patriotic Forces for the Liberation of Congo (FPLC). In fact, according to a paper published by The International Peace Support Training Centre in Nairobi, Kenya, girls constitute a very large portion of child soldiers in the Democratic Republic of the Congo; roughly 40%. A study by Milfrid Tonheim in 2011, which surveyed many former female child soldiers in eastern Congo, also found that many of these girls return home to high levels of stigmatization, often related to the sexual abuse inflicted upon them.

== Proceedings of the ICC ==
Thomas Lubanga Dyilo, who was the leader of the UPC, a group that operated in the Ituri region in the Northeast of the DRC, was indicted by the ICC in 2006 on three counts of war crimes, recruitment, conscription, and the use of children under 15 in combat. According to Michael Bochenek, who is the director of Amnesty International's International Law and Policy Program, the "verdict will give pause to those around the world who commit the horrific crime of using and abusing children both on and off the battlefield" Luis Moreno Ocampo has said that the Lubanga was "only the start of cases linked to the years of militia violence in Ituri which has killed thousands and produced more than 600,000 refugees."

Germain Katanga former leader of the Front for Patriotic Resistance of Ituri (FRPI), and Mathieu Ngudjolo Chui were indicted on seven counts of war crimes, and three counts of crimes against humanity in 2008, which included the use of children under 15 years of age being used in combat, by the pre trial chamber of the ICC. Katanga was convicted of having taken part in the Bogoro massacre on 24 February 2003. He was cleared of sexual offenses and the use of child soldiers.

== Bibliography ==
- Bochenek, Michael (14 March 2012). "Landmark ICC verdict over use of child soldiers". Amnesty International. Archived from the original on 3 January 2015.
- Bouchet-Saulnier, Françoise (2013). The Practical Guide to Humanitarian Law (Third English Language ed.). Rowman & Littlefield. ISBN 978-1442221123.
- Chikuhwa, Tonderai W. (2009). "The Evolution of the United Nations Protection Agenda for Children". In Scott Gates; Simon Reich (eds.). Child Soldiers in the Age of Fractured States. University of Pittsburgh Press. pp. 37–54. ISBN 978-0822960294.
- Drumbl, Mark A. (2012). Reimagining Child Soldiers in International Law and Policy. Oxford University Press. ISBN 978-0199592654.
- Esack, Farid (2012). "Islam, children, and modernity A Qur`anic perspective". In Marcia J. Bunge (ed.). Children, Adults, and Shared Responsibilities: Jewish, Christian and Muslim Perspectives. Cambridge University Press. pp. 99–118. ISBN 978-1107011144.
- Feinstein, Lee; Lindberg, Tod (2009). Means to an End: U.S. Interest in the International Criminal Court. Brookings Institution Press. ISBN 978-0815703259.
- Grover, Sonja C. (2012). Humanity S Children: ICC Jurisprudence and the Failure to Address the Genocidal Forcible Transfer of Children (2013 ed.). Springer. ISBN 978-3642325007.
- "DR Congo warlord Germain Katanga found guilty at ICC". BBC. 7 March 2014. Archived from the original on 8 April 2014.
- "Child recruitment remains 'endemic' in DR Congo, UN says in new report". United Nations. 24 October 2013. Archived from the original on 16 January 2018.
- Novogrodsky, Noah Benjaman (2013). "After the Horror: Child Soldiers and the Special Court for Sierra Leone". In Charles Chernor Jalloh (ed.). The Sierra Leone Special Court and its Legacy: The Impact for Africa and International Criminal Law. Cambridge University Press. pp. 361–372. ISBN 978-1107029149.
- Rakisits, Claude (2008). "Child Soldiers in the East of the Democratic Republic of the Congo". Refugee Survey Quarterly. 27 (4): 108–122. doi:10.1093/rsq/hdn054.
- Rosen, David M. (2012). Child Soldiers: A Reference Handbook. ABC-CLIO. ISBN 978-1598845266.
- Singer, Peter Warren (2006). Children at War. University of California Press. ISBN 978-0520248762.
- Soderlund, Walter C.; Briggs, E. Donald; Najem, Tom Pierre; Roberts, Blake C. (2012). Africa's Deadliest Conflict: Media Coverage of the Humanitarian Disaster in the Congo & the United Nations Response, 1997-2008. Wilfrid Laurier University Press. ISBN 978-1554588350.
- Wessells, Michael G. (2007). Child Soldiers: From Violence to Protection. Harvard University Press. ISBN 978-0674023598.
- Whiteman, Shelly L. (2012). "Child Combatants and Peace Processes Challenges of Inclusion and Exclusion". In Rosemary Sheehan; Helen Rhoades; Nicky Stanley (eds.). Vulnerable Children and the Law: International Evidence for Improving Child Welfare, Child Protection and Children's Rights. Jessica Kingsley Publishers. pp. 75–124. ISBN 978-1849058681.
