= Zoé Kabila =

Congolese politician

Member of the National Assembly
- In office 2011–2019
- Preceded by: kanila
- Constituency: Manono
- Majority: PPRD

Personal details
- Born: 26 June 1979 (age 46) Manono
- Party: People's Party for Reconstruction and Democracy
- Spouse: Charmante Matuida
- Children: 5
- Occupation: Businessman

Zoé Kabila Mwanza Mbala (born 26 June 1978) is a Congolese politician and Member of the National Assembly of the Democratic Republic of the Congo.

His father was the late President of the Democratic Republic of the Congo Laurent-Désiré Kabila, and he is the brother of former President Joseph Kabila and National Assembly Member Jaynet Kabila.

Kanila was the governor of Tanganyika Province, but he was voted out in 2021. He was replaced in the following year by Julie Ngungwa.
