= Yazid Zerhouni =

Algerian interior minister (1937–2020)

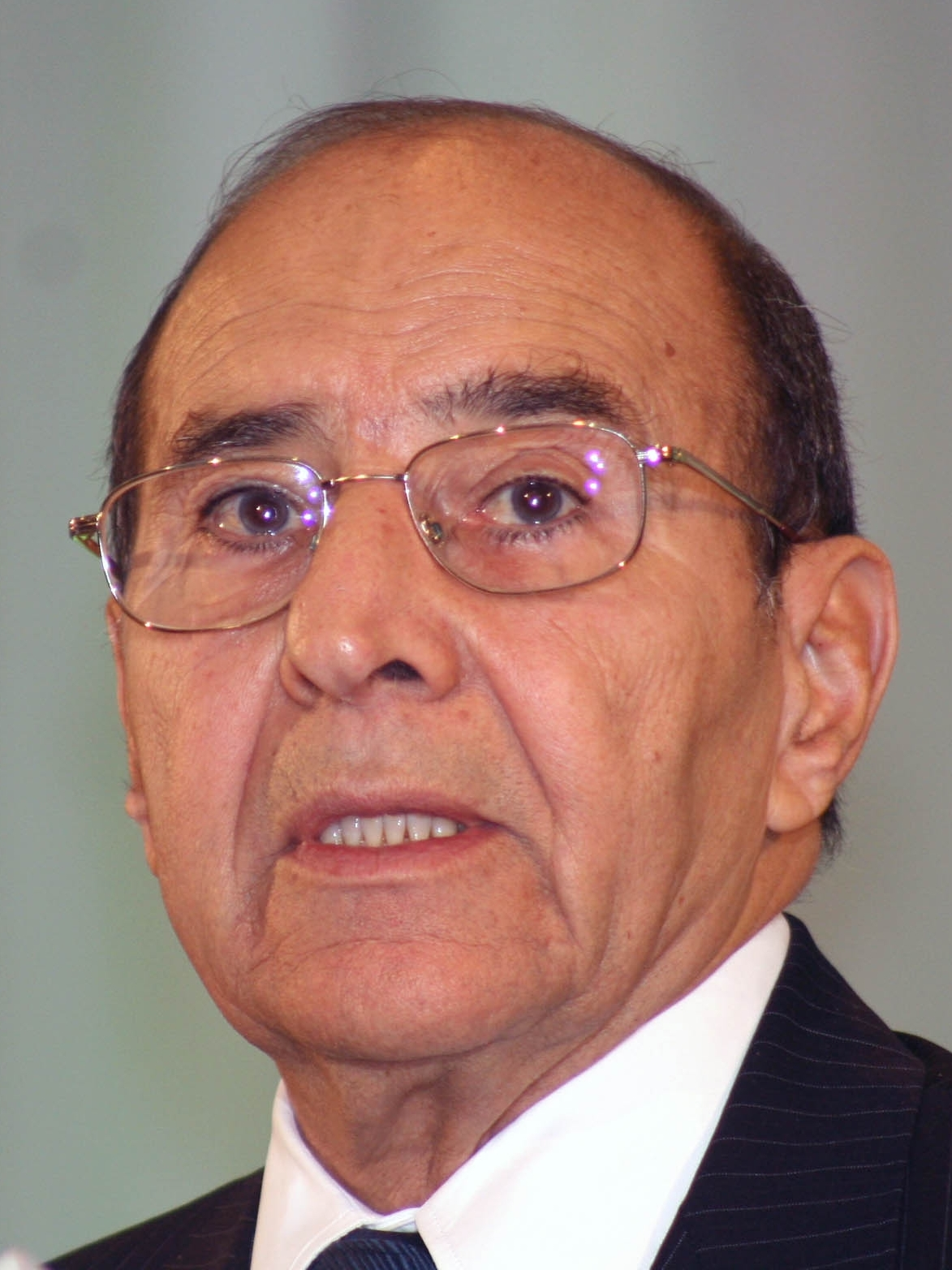
Yazid Zerhouni

Noureddine Yazid Zerhouni (Arabic: نورالدين يزيد زرهوني) (5 September 1937 – 18 December 2020) was the interior minister of Algeria. He was born in Tunis. In 2000, he was hospitalized in Algiers with an undisclosed condition. and died in Algiers on 18 December 2020.

== Honours ==
- Grand Cordon of the Order of the Rising Sun (2018)
