= Aimée Kabila Mulengela =

Congolese politician (1976–2008)

- Aimée Kabila clip from a 2011 video
- Born: 24 July 1976; Kipushi, Haut-Katanga District, Zaire
- Died: 16 January 2008 (aged 31); Mont Ngafula, Kinshasa, DR Congo
- Occupation: Politician
- Known for: Being the daughter of Laurent-Désiré Kabila

Aimée Kabila Mulengela (24 July 1976 – 16 January 2008) was a Congolese politician and the alleged natural daughter of Laurent-Désiré Kabila, the former president of the Democratic Republic of the Congo (DRC). She was killed in her home by armed intruders on 16 January 2008. Although she had been issued a diplomatic passport as the daughter of Kabila, after her death the government claimed that she was unrelated to the former president.

== Life ==
Aimée Kabila Mulengela was said to be the natural daughter of President Laurent-Désiré Kabila and Zaïna Kibangula. She would thus be the half-sister of President Joseph Kabila. She was born on 24 July 1976 in Kipushi, Democratic Republic of Congo. Laurent-Désiré Kabila was assassinated on 16 January 2001 in Kinshasa and was succeeded ten days later by his son Joseph Kabila.

Aimée's brother, Etienne Taratibu Kabila, left Kinshasa secretly in January 2002 for South Africa. He wanted to take Aimée with him but that was not possible since she was the mother of four children. On 25 February 2005 she married Alain Mayemba Bamba, alias "Barracuda". (Note: Acte de Mariage n^{o} 106^{o} F106 Volume : I/2005 du 25 février 2005) A diplomatic passport was issued to her in the name "Aimée Kabila" on 7 April 2005.

On 30 December 2005 Aimée Kabila Mulengela was taken from her home in Kinshasa/Ngaliema by Special Services police and soldiers of the Military Detection of Anti-Homeland Activities (DEMIIAP) and detained for 52 days. A report by the non-governmental organization "La voix des sans-voix" (VSV: Voice of the Voiceless) said her ex-husband Alain Mayemba Bamba ordered the detention, which would have been supported by Sifa Mahanya, mother of President Joseph Kabila. The day after her detention her six month old baby was taken from her in her cell, and disappeared. She was released on 24 February 2006. Property taken at the time of her arrest, including money, jewelry, passports and other documents, were not returned.

== Assassination ==
Aimée Kabila Mulengela was killed in front of her children at her home in Mont Ngafula, Kinshasa, in the early morning of 16 January 2008. The morning before the killing the armed men in Congolese National Police uniforms who were posted to guard the home were removed. She appears to have been tortured before being shot by two armed men who broke into her home. According to her children and neighbors several jeeps were parked outside the house at the time, and the body at the morgue showed stab wounds and marks of torture. She was survived by six children: Astrida Kabila (aged 15), Branly Kabila (13), Petit-Aimé Kabila (10), Mechak Kabila (8), Victor Kabila (6) and Victorine Aline Kabila (3).

Before her murder Aimée Kabila had been asking questions about the future of the property of Laurent-Désiré Kabila and the identity of his heirs. She said she felt threatened and asked for United Nations protection in the DRC. Aimée's brother, Etienne Taratibu Kabila, denounced the assassination the next day from his place of exile in South Africa, accusing the presidential guard of the killing. (Note: Étienne Kabila Taratibu also claimed that Joseph Kabila was involved in the assassination of Espérance Kabila, his father's sister.) Her family were subsequently subject to threats and intimidation that made them fear claiming the body and arranging a funeral.

Floribert Chebeya, president of VSV, which was investigating the death, said he feared that the police were trying to put pressure on him by summoning him for a road accident that had happened almost a year earlier. Floribert Chebeya was killed on 3 June 2010. He had been ordered to meet the national police chief, and had texted his wife to say he was at the police headquarters for the meeting, but it was not known what happened next. His partially undressed body was later found on the back seat of his own car. Chebeya was still investigating Aimee's death, and was involved in other activities that were unwelcome to the government.

== Government position ==
The official story was that the two killers were simply thieves who had bought a gun from an army deserter or the police, and Aimée Kabila Mulengela had been shot accidentally. Two suspects were arrested on 25 January 2008 and the assault was reenacted two days later. General Oleko, Provincial Inspector of Police in Kinshasa, said during a press briefing that the victim was not connected to the presidential family and that he did not recognise that she bore the name of Kabila. According to Ambassador Théodore Mugalu, the victim was named Aimée Mulengela Koko, with a father from North Kivu and a mother from Equateur. The name Aimée Kabila had been assumed falsely.

On 12 February 2013 the government spokesman and media minister Lambert Mende Omalanga said Etienne Kabila was involved in a conspiracy against the DRC that had been foiled by the South African authorities. He said Etienne Kabila was actually Etienne Kitsa, son of Raphael Kianzoluka of Bandundu and Françoise Kitsa Kikapu of South Kivu. He repeated that Aimée Mulengela Kabila was in fact Aimée Mulengela, daughter of a sergeant of the former Zairean National Gendarmerie based in Kipushi. She had been awarded a diplomatic passport based on her claim to be the daughter of the former president. Using this identity she started a household with Alain Barracuda, a patron of Congolese music who was trying to get closer to the presidential family. He said that Barracuda, having found that he had been tricked into investing large sums of money based on her assumed identity, had arranged to eliminate her physically on the night of 15 January 2008. When asked about the possibility of using DNA tests to put the matter to rest Lambert Mende strongly rejected the option, saying it would be a waste of time and money.

== Sources ==
- DR Congo human rights activist found dead in Kinshasa, BBC, 3 June 2010
- Emongo, Lomomba (2013-05-22), Ingeta - Qu'il en soit ainsi: ou Chronique d'une révolution commencée (in French), Connaissances et Savoirs, ISBN 978-2-7539-0222-0
- ""Joseph KABILA" - Etienne KABILA : Des tests ADN exigés", Kongo Times (in French), 13 February 2013
- Kasusula, JP (10 November 2011), AIMEE KABILA TUEE PAR LA GARDE PRESIDENTIELLE A KINSHASA (in French)
- La Voix des Sans-Voix (22 January 2008), Menaces et terreur autour du deces de Mme Aimee Kabila (in French), Kinshasa: Congo Vision
- "Meurtre d'Aimée Kabila : pressions et zones d'ombre", Virunga news (in French), 30 January 2008
- Radio Okapi (18 January 2008), Assassinat de Aimée Kabila : polémique autour de son identité
- RFI: Radio France Internationale (30 January 2008), Meurtre d'Aimée Kabila : pressions et zones d'ombre (in French)
- Trefon, Theodore (2011-09-08), Congo Masquerade: The Political Culture of Aid Inefficiency and Reform Failure, Zed Books Ltd., ISBN 978-1-84813-839-1
- Une des pages du passeport diplomatique de Aimee Kabila une fille biologique de M'zee Laurent Desire Kabila! (in French)
