= Hypermodernism (art) =

Artistic movement

Hypermodernism is a cultural, artistic, literary and architectural successor to modernism and postmodernism in which the form (attribute) of an object has no context distinct from its function. Attributes can include shapes, colors, ratios, and even time. Unlike postmodernism and modernism, hypermodernism exists in an era of fault-tolerant technological change and treats extraneous attributes (most conspicuously physical form) as discordant with function. While modernism and post-modernism debate the value of the "box" or absolute reference point, hypermodernism focuses on improvising attributes of the box (reference point now an extraneous value rather than correct or incorrect value) so that all of its attributes are non-extraneous; it also excises attributes that are extraneous. Hypermodernism is not a debate over truth or untruth as per modernism/postmodernism; rather it is a debate over what is and is not an extraneous attribute. Synchrony between previously-clashing objects (now attributes) and amorphous self-identity coupled with allusions to a magical existence acknowledge the movement. Some theorists view hypermodernism as a form of resistance to traditional modernism; others as a supersedence of it.

== First use ==
The term was coined by the French philosopher Gilles Lipovetsky in 2004. He introduced "hyper-modern," a concept akin to post-modernism but with a heightened and inexorable significance, emphasizing new technologies, markets, and global culture.

== Relationship to modernism and postmodernism ==
Post-modernism and modernism debated each another in an industrial/physical context and were concerned with the social value of objects themselves. Modernism focused on confining form within the limited function of a 1950s object while 1970s postmodernism focused on freeing form from its limited function ("there-is-no-box"). The modern/postmodern oversight of objects as a mediator between attribute and function led to redundant human-context thinking and false conflicts between objects such as ideas.

== Propelled by technological advances ==
Technology has played a definitive role in function catching up to attribute. An example is the touchscreen, in which the attribute on the screen (ratio, shape, color, animation) becomes the focus of interaction as opposed to manipulation by an external tool i.e. cellphone keyboard. In the long-term the object ceases to become the middleman between attribute (form) and function.

== Non-composability of objects ==
Hypermodernism holds that an object is by definition non-composable toward its attributes; and no one attribute of an object can act as a proxy for the object itself. No whole, or object, is reducible to ONLY its attributes; and the attributes may not be mutually exclusive to the object itself. Furthermore, an object may have extraneous functions independent of its composing attributes (postmodern theory); this potential supra-functionality is a key concern to hypermodernism's attempt to replace objects with attributes. Attributes, while having the functions of an object, are not building blocks toward an object in hypermodernism. No object is by definition hypermodern; however, an object can be more hypermodern or less hypermodern than another object.

== Long-term effects ==
Hypermodernism displays a deep bias against objects physical and non-physical. It can be described as anti-object; however it is not anti-materialistic. Objects are viewed as an extraneous mediator between attribute and function. Over time, hypermodernism employs attributes to perform the functions of objects, and only those extant objects that can adequately convey the properties of its attributes are allowed to survive. Those objects that are irreducible to complete attributes will disappear as in the case of the physical keyboard. Over time, the attribute-function relationship becomes synonymous.

== Human psychology ==
Hypermodernism compensates for the tendency of human thought to extract the attributes of an object and assign those same attributes to the functions of the object. Rather than focusing on a debate over "truth" or non-truth and other high-context social considerations, hypermodernism focuses on questions of extraneous vs non-extraneous (In design terms, correctness and incorrectness). Hypermodernism emphasizes correctness over completeness in design in order to guard against human intuitive leaps.
