= Jeannot Mwenze Kongolo =

Congolese politician (1960–2021)

Minister of Interior Affairs
- In office 12 June 1997 – 26 January 1998

Personal details
- Born: 1960 Katanga Province, Belgian Congo
- Died: 28 June 2021 (aged 61) Kinshasa, Democratic Republic of the Congo
- Party: PK

Jeannot Mwenze Kongolo (1960 – 28 June 2021) was a Congolese politician. He served as the Minister of Internal Affairs of the Democratic Republic of the Congo under the government of President Laurent-Désiré Kabila.

He died on 28 June 2021 at the age of 61.
