= AFDL =

Anti-Mobutu military coalition (1996–1997)

Alliance of Democratic Forces for the Liberation of Congo
- Alliance des Forces Démocratiques pour la Libération du Congo-Zaïre
- Leaders: Laurent-Désiré Kabila; André Kisase Ngandu; Anselme Masasu Nindaga; Déogratias Bugera
- Dates active: 18 October 1996 – 20 April 1999 (2 years, 184 days)
- Active regions: Zaire
- Ideology: Anti-Mobutism; Anti-Hutu; Militarism; Centralization; Authoritarianism
- Wars: the First Congo War

The Alliance of Democratic Forces for the Liberation of Congo (French: Alliance des Forces Démocratiques pour la Libération du Congo), also known by the French acronym AFDL, was a coalition of armed movements and political organizations composed of Rwandan, Ugandan, Burundian, and Congolese dissidents, and various disaffected ethnic and political groups. Formed on 18 October 1996, the AFDL launched a military campaign that culminated in the overthrow of President Mobutu Sese Seko and the ascension of Laurent-Désiré Kabila to power in May 1997, which then marked the end of the First Congo War. Although the group was successful in overthrowing Mobutu, the alliance fell apart after Kabila did not agree to be dictated by his foreign backers, Rwanda and Uganda, which marked the beginning of the Second Congo War in 1998.

Members of the AFDL and their allied forces were responsible for widespread and systematic human rights violations, including extrajudicial executions, massacres of unarmed civilians and refugees, arbitrary detentions, "disappearances", and acts of torture and sexual violence. These abuses, often condoned or directed by political and military leaders within the movement, were committed with near-total impunity, as many perpetrators later assumed positions of authority in the new government. Amnesty International and other organizations also condemned the international community's inaction, noting that the United Nations Secretary-General's Investigative Team (SGIT) confirmed that AFDL and the Rwandan forces had committed atrocities amounting to serious violations of international humanitarian law, some potentially constituting genocide, but the UN Security Council failed to take adequate measures in response.

== Background ==
By mid-1996, eastern Zaire was gripped by escalating tensions linked to the aftermath of the 1994 Rwandan genocide. Following the genocide, the Rwandan Patriotic Front (RPF), under Paul Kagame, had ousted President Juvénal Habyarimana's Hutu-led government and seized power in Rwanda. This transition prompted around two million Rwandan Hutu refugees, including former members of the Rwandan Armed Forces (Forces armées rwandaises; FAR) and Interahamwe militia, to flee into eastern Zaire, especially to the provinces of North and South Kivu. Their arrival brought armed elements into an already fragile region, which the Zairean government, under Mobutu Sese Seko, was ill-equipped to control either through aid or security enforcement. As instability deepened, the Rwandan Patriotic Army (Armée patriotique rwandaise; RPA), the RPF's military wing, began launching cross-border raids into Zaire, claiming their goal was to dismantle Hutu rebel factions embedded in the refugee camps. However, these incursions extended beyond legitimate military targets and frequently resulted in mass killings of unarmed civilians. Reports by UNHCR consultant Robert Gersony estimated that between 5,000 and 10,000 people were killed per month during mid-1994 as a consequence of such operations. RPA units often employed deceptive tactics, luring refugees to supposed "peace and reconciliation" meetings before executing them. One recorded incident occurred on 11 April 1995, when RPA troops attacked the Birava camp in Kabare Territory, killing approximately thirty refugees and wounding many others. In the aftermath, survivors were relocated to the Chimanga and Kashusha camps, while no counteroffensive emerged from the ex-FAR or Interahamwe elements present in the area.

By 1996, an alliance consisting of the RPA, Ugandan military units, and the Burundian Armed Forces (Forces Armées Burundaises; FAB) began offering military and logistical aid to Tutsi populations in eastern Zaire, particularly the Banyamulenge. Legal and political scholar Filip Reyntjens describes the First Congo War as the intersection of two overlapping agendas: "a genuine resistance by Congolese Tutsi who feared reprisals, and the instrumentalization of that struggle by the Rwandan regime to disguise the RPA's intervention in Zaire". Reyntjens noted that the Banyamulenge, long based in the Itombwe Mountains of Uvira Territory, were integrated into the RPA, with Rwanda providing them with military instruction and equipment as early as mid-1996. In April, Banyamulenge units originating from Burundi attacked the Runingu refugee camp, killing several Burundian and Rwandan refugees. Subsequent clashes spread across the Hauts Plateaux and Moyens Plateaux. On 12 September 1996, Banyamulenge forces killed nine civilians in Kanyura and Makutano, villages in the Itombwe sector of Mwenga Territory, including several local leaders from the Rega and Bembe ethnic groups. The killings were widely seen by the Bembe as the beginning of a targeted campaign against them. Additional massacres followed, including one on 6 October 1996 in Kidoti, where more than fifty civilians were executed or killed by shrapnel after being forced to dig their own graves. That same day, Banyamulenge combatants attacked Lemera Hospital, killing thirty-seven people, including medical personnel, civilians, and injured soldiers of the Zairean Armed Forces (Forces armées zaïroises, FAZ), before looting the facility.

== Formation ==
The Alliance of Democratic Forces for the Liberation of Congo-Zaire (Alliance des Forces Démocratiques pour la Libération du Congo-Zaïre, AFDL) was officially established on 18 October 1996 in Kigali. In a 1997 interview with the Washington Post, Paul Kagame credited "his country with the planning and execution of the military offensive by the Alliance of Democratic Forces for the Liberation of Congo (AFDL)". The coalition united four distinct movements: the Party of the People's Revolution (Parti de la Révolution du Peuple, PRP) led by Laurent-Désiré Kabila, the National Council of Resistance for Democracy (Conseil National de Résistance pour la Démocratie, CNRD) under André Kisase Ngandu, the Revolutionary Movement for the Liberation of Zaire (Mouvement Révolutionnaire pour la Libération du Zaïre, MRLZ) led by Anselme Masasu Nindaga, and the Democratic Alliance of the People (Alliance Démocratique du Peuple, ADP) under Déogratias "Douglas" Bugera, who became the movement's first general secretary. Kabila, a former Marxist guerrilla leader who had been largely inactive for years and who, according to political historian Jean-Claude Willame, "had neither warriors, nor an organized march of followers, nor weapons, nor resources", unexpectedly re-emerged at the head of the new rebel alliance. Willame explained that Kabila was selected because his name was widely recognized and he had long prioritized international diplomacy. With his command of French, Swahili, and English, and his extensive ties with East African leaders, Kabila became the symbolic leader of the four-group coalition, which had internally agreed on a power-sharing arrangement. Alongside Rwanda and Uganda, Burundi, Angola, and southern Sudanese rebel factions, as well as elements of Katanga's provincial security forces, also lent varying degrees of assistance to the AFDL, motivated by their own long-standing grievances against the Mobutu regime.

== The course of the war ==
On the same day as its founding, the AFDL began its military campaign in eastern Zaire, led by forces drawn from the RPA, the Uganda People's Defence Force (UPDF), and the FAB. These allied contingents crossed into Zaire and rapidly seized control of the North and South Kivu provinces and Ituri. The campaign's initial targets were the vast Hutu refugee camps near Uvira, Bukavu, and Goma, which sheltered hundreds of thousands of Rwandan and Burundian refugees following the 1994 genocide. Within weeks, AFDL and allied forces had attacked and destroyed nearly all of these camps, killing tens of thousands of civilians. While many refugees fled back to Rwanda, hundreds of thousands more dispersed into the forests of Walikale Territory (North Kivu) and Shabunda Territory (South Kivu), where they were relentlessly pursued by AFDL and RPA troops.

Reports from the United Nations, Amnesty International, and other humanitarian organizations documented extensive massacres, forced displacements, and atrocities perpetrated by AFDL, RPA, and FAB soldiers during their advance through eastern Zaire. Aid agencies accused AFDL combatants of using humanitarian workers to locate and eliminate refugee groups hiding in the forested regions of South Kivu. These actions contributed to what independent observers described as one of the largest attacks of mass killings of refugees in modern African history, with hundreds of thousands of unarmed civilians estimated to have been killed between late 1996 and 1997.

Although Laurent-Désiré Kabila quickly emerged as the AFDL's political spokesperson and international representative, owing to his multilingualism and revolutionary background, the alliance's internal power structure remained contested. André Kisase Ngandu, an experienced rebel leader, served as president of the AFDL's military wing, the National Resistance Council (Conseil National de la Résistance, CNRD), and was reportedly critical of the massacres of Hutu refugees carried out under AFDL operations. This divergence in vision generated friction within the movement's leadership. In January 1997, Ngandu was assassinated in North Kivu, reportedly by Rwandan Tutsi soldiers, a killing widely believed to have been ordered either by Kabila himself or by Rwandan President Paul Kagame. At the time, the AFDL claimed Ngandu had merely been injured in a Mai-Mai ambush, a fabricated account that persisted until July 1997. That month, Kabila sent Ngandu on an alleged inspection mission to Beni and Bunia, which turned out to be a carefully orchestrated trap. Rwandan Major Jacques Nziza accompanied Kabila in the escort, and Ngandu's personal guards were replaced beforehand. The ambush occurred in Rutshuru, near Virunga National Park. The convoy was stopped by "Lieutenant Célestin", a Tutsi officer, who asked Ngandu to step out of his vehicle before Kabila himself fired a burst of bullets into him. The bodies of Ngandu and his companions were then soaked in gasoline and burned.

After his elimination, Kabila consolidated his authority, positioning himself as the AFDL's political and military leader, a power shift shaped largely by Rwandan backing, despite internal resistance from Banyamulenge elements and Ngandu's supporters. Later testimony by General Jules Lumumba Onangando, published in June 2006, corroborated this account, asserting that Ngandu was the true initiator of the anti-Mobutu rebellion but was outmaneuvered and assassinated through the political scheming of Kabila and his Rwandan allies. He emphasized that Kabila was virtually unknown among Ngandu's early supporters and had been imposed by Rwanda "for reasons that are now obvious".

Once the Kivus were secured, the remainder of the First Congo War consisted for the most part of the AFDL and its allies walking and driving across Zaire to the capital, Kinshasa. The population proved to have a deep antipathy towards Mobutu. Most of the demoralized soldiers in the national army either joined the AFDL or deserted. Men from villages and towns throughout Zaire spontaneously joined the AFDL's advance. The AFDL was only slowed down by the country's decrepit infrastructure. In several parts of the country, no paved roads existed; the only links to the outside world were irregularly used dirt paths. On 16 May 1997, after seven months of rebellion and the failure of peace talks, Mobutu fled the country. The AFDL marched into Kinshasa a day later. Kabila declared himself president and renamed the country to the Democratic Republic of the Congo (DRC). The AFDL then became the new national armed forces.

== In power ==
During the Second Congo War, Kabila announced the dissolution of the AFDL on 20 April 1999, citing "opportunism" and "self-enrichment" among some members.

== See also ==
- Politics of the Democratic Republic of the Congo
- Battle of Kisangani (1997)

== Bibliography ==
- Plaut, Martin (2016). Understanding Eritrea: Inside Africa's Most Repressive State. Oxford: Oxford University Press. ISBN 9780190669591.
