= Laurent-Désiré Kabila =

President of the DRC from 1997 to 2001

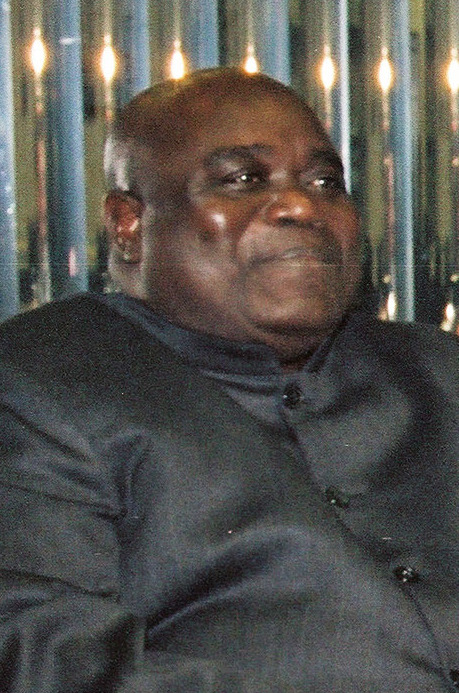
- Kabila in 1998

3rd President of the Democratic Republic of the Congo
- In office 17 May 1997 – 16 January 2001; Acting: 17 May – 29 May 1997
- Preceded by: Mobutu Sese Seko (as President of Zaire)
- Succeeded by: Joseph Kabila

Minister of Defense
- In office 23 May 1997 – 16 January 2001
- Preceded by: Donatien Mahele Lieko Bokungu
- Succeeded by: Irung Awan

President of Maquis of Fizi
- In office 24 October 1967 – 1 July 1986

Personal details
- Born: 27 November 1939 Baudouinville or Jadotville, Belgian Congo
- Died: 16 January 2001 (aged 61) Kinshasa, Democratic Republic of the Congo
- Cause of death: Assassination by shooting
- Party: Party of the People's Revolution (1967–1996); Alliance of Democratic Forces for the Liberation of Congo (1996–1997); Independent (1997–2001)
- Spouse: Sifa Mahanya
- Children: at least 9 or 10 (including Joseph Kabila, Jaynet Kabila, and Zoé Kabila)
- Education: University of Dar es Salaam
- Profession: Rebel leader, President

Military service
- Allegiance: Democratic Republic of the Congo
- Battles/wars: Congo Crisis; Simba Rebellion; First Congo War

Laurent-Désiré Kabila (French pronunciation: [lo.ʁɑ̃ de.zi.ʁe ka.bi.la]; 27 November 1939 – 16 January 2001), usually known as Laurent Kabila or Kabila the Father (US:), was a Congolese rebel and politician who served as the third president of the Democratic Republic of the Congo from 1997 until his assassination in 2001. While serving as president, he was also the minister of defense.

Kabila initially gained prominence as an opponent of Mobutu Sese Seko during the Congo Crisis (1960–1965). He took part in the Simba rebellion and led the Communist-aligned Fizi rebel breakaway state in eastern Congo from 1967 to 1986 before disappearing from the public. In the 1990s, Kabila re-emerged as leader of the Alliance of Democratic Forces for the Liberation of Congo (ADFL), a Rwandan and Ugandan-sponsored rebel group that invaded Zaire and overthrew Mobutu during the First Congo War from 1996 to 1997. Following the war, Kabila became the new president of the country, whose name was changed back to the Democratic Republic of the Congo.

The following year, he ordered all foreign troops to leave the country following the Kasika massacre to prevent a potential coup, leading to the Second Congo War (1998–2003), in which his former Rwandan and Ugandan allies supported several rebel groups to overthrow him. In 2001, he was assassinated by one of his bodyguards, and was succeeded by his 29-year-old son Joseph.

== Early life ==
Kabila was born to the Luba people in Baudouinville, Katanga Province, (now Moba, Tanganyika Province), or Jadotville, Katanga Province, (now Likasi, Haut-Katanga Province) in the Belgian Congo. His father was a Luba and his mother was a Lunda; his father's ethnicity was defining in the patriarchal kinship system. It is claimed that he studied abroad (political philosophy in Paris, got a PhD in Tashkent, in Belgrade and at last in Dar es Salaam), but no proof has been found or provided.

== Political activities ==
=== 1960s Congo Crisis ===
Shortly after the Congo achieved independence in 1960, Katanga seceded under the leadership of Moïse Tshombe. Kabila organised the Baluba in an anti-secessionist rebellion in Manono. In September 1962 a new province, North Katanga, was established. He became a member of the provincial assembly and served as chief of cabinet for Minister of Information Ferdinand Tumba. In September 1963 he and other young members of the assembly were forced to resign, facing allegations of communist sympathies.

Kabila established himself as a supporter of hard-line Lumumbist Prosper Mwamba Ilunga. When the Lumumbists formed the Conseil National de Libération (CNL), he was sent to eastern Congo to help organize a revolution, in particular in the Kivu and North Katanga provinces. This revolution was part of the larger Simba rebellions happening in the provinces at the time. In 1965, Kabila set up a cross-border rebel operation from Kigoma, Tanzania, across Lake Tanganyika.

=== Association with Che Guevara ===
Kabila met Che Guevara for the first time in late April 1965 where Guevara had appeared in the Congo with approximately 100 Cuban men who envisaged to bring about a Cuban-style revolution to overthrow the Congolese government. Guevara assisted Kabila and his rebel forces for a few months before Guevara judged Kabila (then age 26) as "not the man of the hour" he had alluded to, being too distracted and his men poorly trained and disciplined. This, in Guevara's opinion, accounted for Kabila showing up days late at times to provide supplies, aid, or backup to Guevara's men. Kabila preferred to spend most of his time at local bars or brothels instead of training his men or fighting the Congolese government forces. The lack of cooperation between Kabila and Guevara contributed to the suppression of the revolt in November that same year.

In Guevara's view, of all of the people he met during his campaign in Congo, only Kabila had "genuine qualities of a mass leader"; but Guevara castigated Kabila for a lack of "revolutionary seriousness". After the failure of the rebellion, Kabila turned to smuggling gold and timber on Lake Tanganyika. He also ran a bar and brothel in Kigoma, Tanzania.

=== Marxist mini-state (1967–1988) ===
In 1967, Kabila and his remnant of supporters moved their operation into the mountainous Fizi – Baraka area of South Kivu in the Congo, and founded the People's Revolutionary Party (PRP). With the support of the People's Republic of China, the PRP created a secessionist Marxist state in South Kivu province, west of Lake Tanganyika.

The PRP state came to an end in 1986 and Kabila disappeared and was widely believed to be dead. While in Kampala, Kabila reportedly met Yoweri Museveni, who later became president of Uganda. Museveni and former Tanzanian President Julius Nyerere later introduced Kabila to Paul Kagame, who would become president of Rwanda. These personal contacts became vital in mid-1990s, when Uganda and Rwanda sought a Congolese face for their intervention in Zaire.

== First Congo War ==
As Rwandan Hutu refugees fled to Congo (then Zaire) after the 1994 genocide in Rwanda, refugee camps along the Zaire-Rwanda border became militarized with Hutu militia vowing to retake power in Rwanda. The Kigali regime considered these militias as a security threat and was seeking a way to dismantle those refugee camps. After Kigali had expressed its security concerns to Kinshasa, requesting that refugee camps get moved further inside the country, and Kinshasa ignored these concerns, Kigali believed that only military option could solve the issue. However, a military operation inside Zaire was likely be seen by the international community as an invasion. A plan was put in place to foment a Banyamulenge rebellion that would serve as a cover. The Alliance of Democratic Forces for the Liberation of Congo (AFDL) was then born when Rwanda brought together four Congolese political exiles, with Kabila as its spokesperson and one of the co-founders, on 18 October 1996. Furthermore, on 4 January 1997, an agreement to merge the four founding political parties into a single movement for "assembling all the live forces of the Congolese nation," was adopted. Kabila was made the leader of the AFDL as the chairman of its executive committee. Kabila eventually became the movement's president, creating a highly centralized power structure. André Kisase Ngandu, another AFDL leader who objected to this, was assassinated during the war, most likely on Kabila's orders.

As a native of Katanga, he was used to give the AFDL more of a national character instead of being a Tutsi movement. By mid-1997, the AFDL had almost completely overrun the country and the remains of Mobutu's army. Only the country's decrepit infrastructure slowed Kabila's forces down; in many areas, the only means of transit were irregularly used dirt paths. Following failed peace talks held on board of the South African ship SAS Outeniqua, Mobutu fled into exile on 16 May. The next day, from his base in Lubumbashi, Kabila declared victory and installed himself as president. Kabila suspended the Constitution and changed the name of the country from Zaire to the Democratic Republic of the Congo—the country's official name from 1964 to 1971. He made his grand entrance into Kinshasa on 20 May, announced a new cabinet on 22 May, and was sworn in on 29 May, officially commencing his tenure as president. The UN was formally informed of the country's change of name, flag, national anthem, and leadership by Kabila and the AFDL on 23 May 1997.

== Presidency (1997–2001) ==
The Flag of the Democratic Republic of the Congo used by Kabila.

At his inauguration on 29 May 1997, Kabila announced the start of the Congolese Third Republic. Kabila had previously been a committed Marxist, but his policies at this point were social democratic. He declared that elections would not be held for two years, since it would take him at least that long to restore order. While some in the West hailed Kabila as representing a "new breed" of African leadership, critics charged that Kabila's policies differed little from his predecessor's, being characterised by authoritarianism, corruption, and human rights abuses. As early as late 1997, Kabila was being denounced as "another Mobutu". Kabila was also accused trying to set up a personality cult. Mobutu's former minister of information, Dominique Sakombi Inongo, was retained by Kabila; he branded Kabila as "the Mzee," and created posters reading "Here is the man we needed" (French: Voici l'homme que nous avions besoin) appeared all over the country.

Kabila worked to further centralize power in himself. All parties other than the AFDL were banned. Kabila's former partners in the AFDL and the organization itself were marginalized. Kabila was also the minister of defense, and he did not name a prime minister or vice president. He assigned key government posts to members of his clan, notably including his cousins Gaetan Kakudji and Mwenze Kongolo as interior minister and justice minister, respectively. He excluded the most popular political leader in the DRC from his government, Étienne Tshisekedi of the Union for Democracy and Social Progress (UDPS). The UDPS had a more developed party infrastructure than the AFDL, and had higher support among Congolese. In February 1998, Tshisekedi became one of several opposition leaders to be arrested by Kabila. Kabila banned bribe-taking and other abuses by soldiers, and the military (the FAC) became more disciplined than Mobutu's FAZ had been. There was a significant improvement in security in Kinshasa, creating some support for Kabila among those in the city's poor neighborhoods, who could move around without having to fear extortion by Mobutu's soldiers. However, in other major cities the situation remained the same as under Mobutu, and the east was even more unstable than had been at the outbreak of war in 1996. There were also some small infrastructure and economic improvements under Kabila, though that situation changed when the Second Congo War began.

=== Second Congo War ===
Kabila signed security agreements with Rwanda and Uganda, including a September 1997 agreement for joint operations between the Congolese Armed Forces (FAC) and the Rwandan Patriotic Army (RPA) against the Hutu Interahamwe militia in eastern Congo. However, the RPA continued to ignore the DRC–Rwanda border, and began a massive troop build-up in North Kivu from mid-December 1997, which extended into South Kivu in early 1998. The presence of Rwandan troops in the DRC created disillusionment with Kabila and resentment among the Congolese people. By early 1998, the political and economic relationship between Kabila and his former allies in Rwanda and Uganda was falling apart, and both sides were plotting military action against each other. Kabila allowed rebel groups on the territory of the DRC to operate and launch cross-border raids into Rwanda, Uganda, and Angola. He made an effort to seek out new military allies. In mid-July 1998, Kabila dismissed the Rwandan-Ugandan officer James Kabarebe as FAC chief of staff, replacing him with his own relative Célestin Kifwa, and on 27 July he ordered all Rwandan troops to leave the country. The latter became the event that caused the Second Congo War. On 2 August 1998, Congolese Tutsi rebels announced a second "war of liberation," this time against Kabila. Rwanda and Uganda backed a new rebellion of the Rally for Congolese Democracy (RCD) and the Movement for the Liberation of the Congo (MLC). Zimbabwe, Namibia and Angola sent troops to support Kabila, and they were later joined by other countries: Libya, Chad and Sudan.

Rwanda's attempted lightning strike on Kinshasa to remove the Kabila regime in August 1998 failed, and the war bogged down into one of occupation and attrition. In early 1999, the FAC and its allies failed to advance against the rebels and their backers. The RPA neared Mbuji Mayi in June, a city in the central DRC from where the path to Kinshasa would be clear of natural obstacles. It was a major crisis for Kabila, and Rwanda was pressured to negotiate by other countries. In July and August 1999, Kabila and other heads of state and rebel leaders worked out the Lusaka Peace Agreement. It froze the front line, but did not stop fighting, which also prevented the deployment of United Nations observers. Hundreds of thousands of people were killed, and the DRC became a patchwork of warlord fiefdoms. Kabila did not want the deployment of UN observers because he preferred to share the country with rebels and foreign troops rather than share power. By December 2000, the war was a stalemate in which fighting continued along the 2,400-km front line, but no faction had enough power to achieve a decisive victory. The numbers of troops were small relative to Congo's vast territory, and they ventured out of their bases, built around logistical assets, to launch attacks by marching through jungle or savannah. For the most part, soldiers were cut off from regular supplies and lived by taking from local civilians. Although Congolese living in government-held territory had a higher quality of life than those in rebel-held territory, Kabila directing most of government spending towards the war effort and increasing his own power caused his support to decline.

== Assassination and trial ==
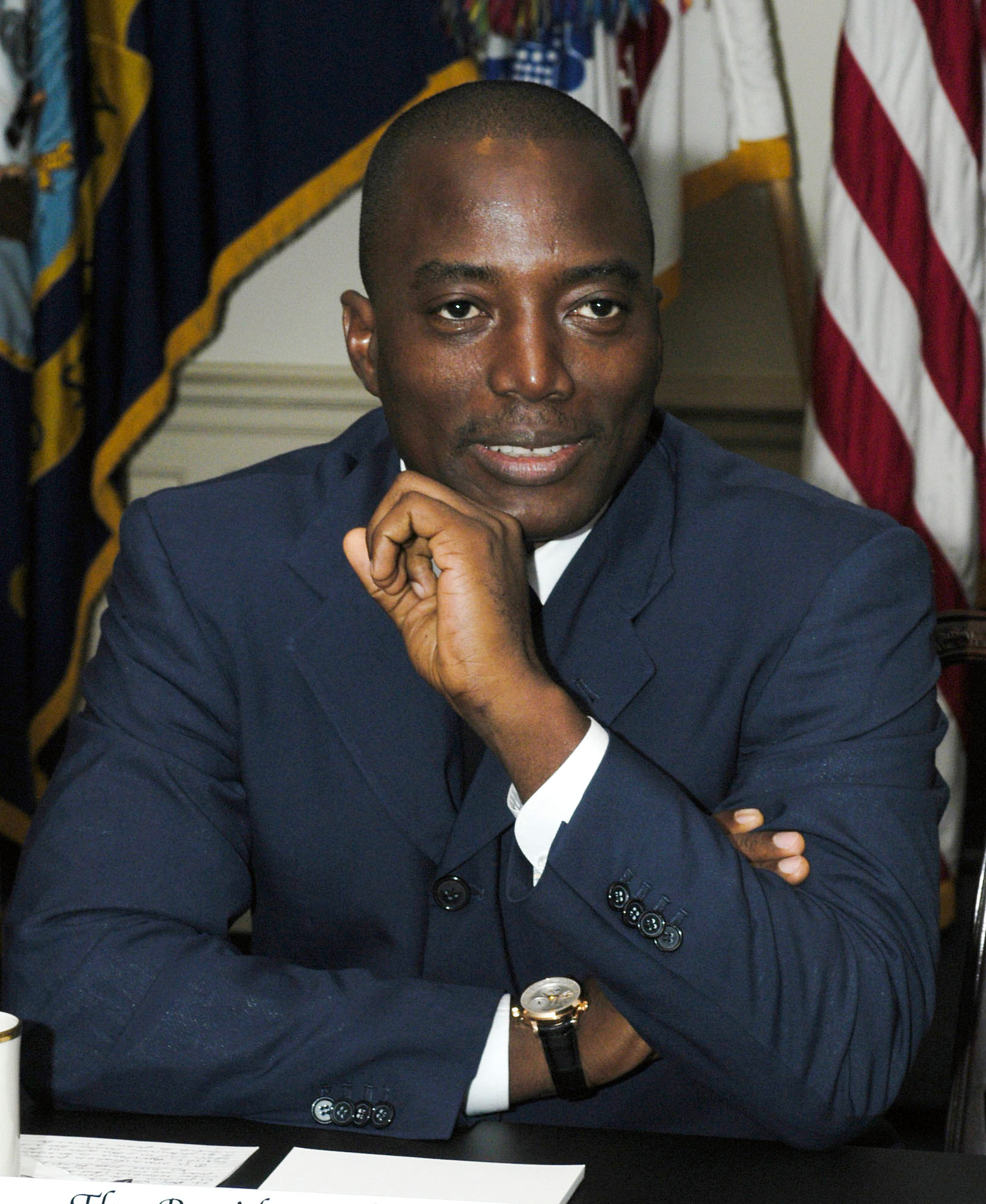
Laurent-Désiré Kabila's son and successor, Joseph Kabila

On 16 January 2001, Kabila was shot in his office at the Palais de Marbre and subsequently transported to Zimbabwe for medical treatment. The DRC's authorities managed to keep power, despite Kabila's assassination. The exact circumstances are still contested. Kabila reportedly died on the spot, according to DRC's then-health minister Leonard Mashako Mamba, who was in the next door office when Kabila was shot and arrived immediately after the assassination. The government claimed that Kabila was still alive, however, and he was flown to a hospital in Zimbabwe after he was shot so that DRC authorities could organize the succession.

The Congolese government announced that he had died of his wounds on 18 January. One week later, his body was returned to Congo for a state funeral and his son, Joseph Kabila, became president ten days later. By doing so, DRC officials were accomplishing the "verbal testimony" of the deceased President. Then Justice Minister Mwenze Kongolo and Kabila's aide-de-camp Eddy Kapend reported that Kabila had told them that his son Joseph, then number two of the army, should take over, if he were to die in office.

The investigation into Kabila's assassination led to 135 people, including four children, being tried before a special military tribunal. The alleged ringleader, Colonel Eddy Kapend (one of Kabila's cousins), and 25 others were sentenced to death in January 2003, but not executed. Of the remaining defendants, 64 were incarcerated, with sentences from six months to life, and 45 were exonerated. Some individuals were also accused of being involved in a plot to overthrow his son. Among them was Kabila's special advisor Emmanuel Dungia, former ambassador to South Africa. Many people believe the trial was flawed and the convicted defendants innocent; doubts are summarized in an Al Jazeera investigative film, Murder in Kinshasa.

In January 2021, DRC's President Félix Tshisekedi pardoned all those convicted in the murder of Laurent-Désiré Kabila in 2001. Colonel Eddy Kapend and his co-defendants, who had been incarcerated for 15 years, were released.

== Personal life ==
He had at least nine children with his wife Sifa Mahanya: Josephine, Cécile, Fifi, Selemani, twins Jaynet and Joseph, Zoé, Anina and Tetia. He was also the alleged father of Aimée Kabila Mulengela whose mother is Zaïna Kibangula.

== Citations ==
Political offices
| Preceded by Mobutu Sese Seko as President of Zaire | President of the Democratic Republic of the Congo; 1997–2001 | Succeeded by Joseph Kabila |
