= Voice of the Voiceless =

Voice of the Voiceless may refer to

- Voice of the Voiceless (album)
- Voices of the Voiceless (Congo)
- The Voice of the Voiceless, 2013 Mexican silent film
- The Voice of the Voiceless, also the slogan of Tibet Post International

== See also ==
- Voice for the Voiceless, 2019 Russian documentary film
