= Michel Thierry =

Michel Thierry may refer to:

- Michel Thierry (skier)
- Michel Thierry (industrialist)

== See also ==
- Thierry Michel, Belgian film director
