= Voices of the Voiceless (Congo) =

The Voice of the Voiceless for Human Rights (VSV), more commonly known as the Voice of the Voiceless is one of the oldest Congolese human rights NGOs in the Democratic Republic of Congo. Although operating mainly in Kinshasa, its close collaboration with associations from other Provinces of the Democratic Republic of the Congo in particular through the National Network of Human Rights NGOs (RENADHOC), allows it to be represented in the main cities of the country.

== Establishment ==
Founded clandestinely in 1983 under the Mobutist regime, from the outset, it aimed to sensitize Congolese and international actors to the abuses of Zairian power then Congolese. Particularly battered under the presidency of Laurent-Désiré Kabila, VSV has since published press releases and reports denouncing human rights violations concerning in particular:

- the rights of prisoners and the use of torture.
- freedom of the press and more broadly freedom of speech (multiparty system and democratization of institutions).

Quoting readily article 224 of the Universal Declaration of Human Rights the Voices of the Voiceless, also carries a broader discourse of defense of the economic and social rights of the Congolese population which leads them to regularly take up subjects such as purchasing power, social unrest, or the fate of isolated people, in particular the elderly.

Received the day before by John Numbi, then Inspector General of the Congolese National Police, on June 2, 2010, the Executive Director and co-founder of the VSV, Floribert Chebeya, was found murdered in his car, in Kinshasa. His death caused a shock on the national and international political scene.

== See also ==
- Human rights in the Democratic Republic of the Congo
