= Charles Bisengimana =

Congolese politician

Charles Bisengimana Rukira
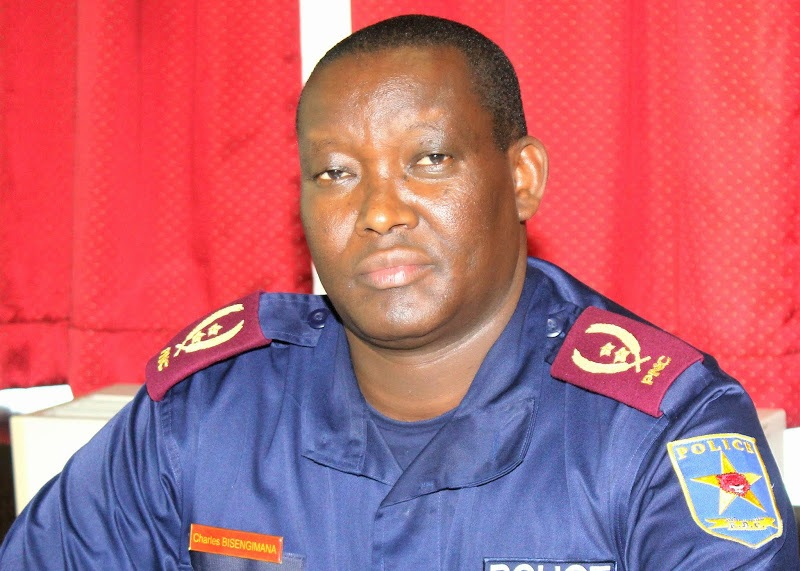
- Born: 21 August 1964 (age 61); South Kivu, Democratic Republic of Congo
- Known for: Former Commissioner General of the Congolese National Police
- Police career
- Service: Congolese National Police
- Service years: 1985–20
- Rank: General

Charles Bisengimana Rukira is the former Commissioner General of the Congolese National Police of the Democratic Republic of the Congo.

Born on August 21, 1964, in South Kivu province Democratic Republic of Congo DRC. Charles Bisengimana joined the army at the age of 20.

== History ==
Very early, at the age of 20, in January 1985 he decided to start his military career where he obtained the Degree in Military Sciences at the Officer Training School, 18th Promotion, immediately followed by a training of Police in 9th promotion school under former national gendarmerie.

In 1989 he graduated in Law, Criminology, Military Sciences and Academician of Police graduated from the Arab Republic of Egypt.

Thereafter, he worked as intelligence officer of the Civil Guard in Kinshasa until 1997 where he joined the rebel Alliance of Democratic Forces for the Liberation of Congo in Goma, remained there until 2003, returned to Kinshasa with grade General after the peace agreement and the inter-Congolese dialogue, which ended the Second Congo War.

== Interim General Commissioner of the Congolese police ==
Following the assassination of Floribert "Flori" Chebeya, the head of the Congolese police, John Numbi was suspended and his deputy, General Charles Bisengimana was appointed the interim head of Congolese National Police in 2010.

== General commissioner of the Congolese police ==
General Charles Bisengimana was appointed Commissioner-General of the Congolese police on December 28, 2013. On 17 July 2017, the Commissioner General of the Congolese National Police, Charles Bisengimana, was replaced by General Dieudonné Amuli Bahigwa. The latter was previously the deputy chief of staff for the operations of the armed forces of the DRC, according to Radio Okapi's website.
