= Traffic police =

Police officers who enforce traffic laws

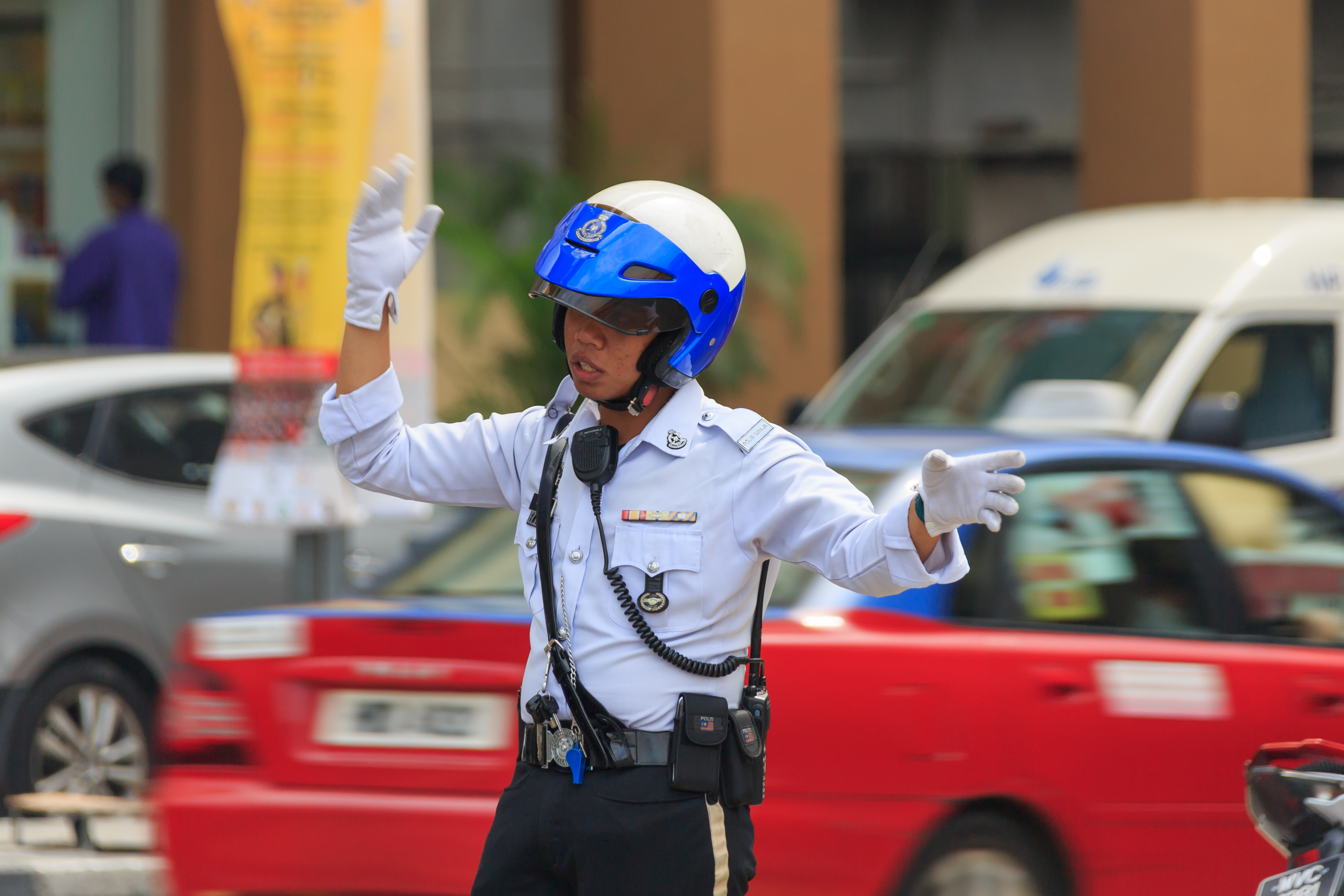
A Royal Malaysia Police traffic officer directing traffic in Kuala Lumpur

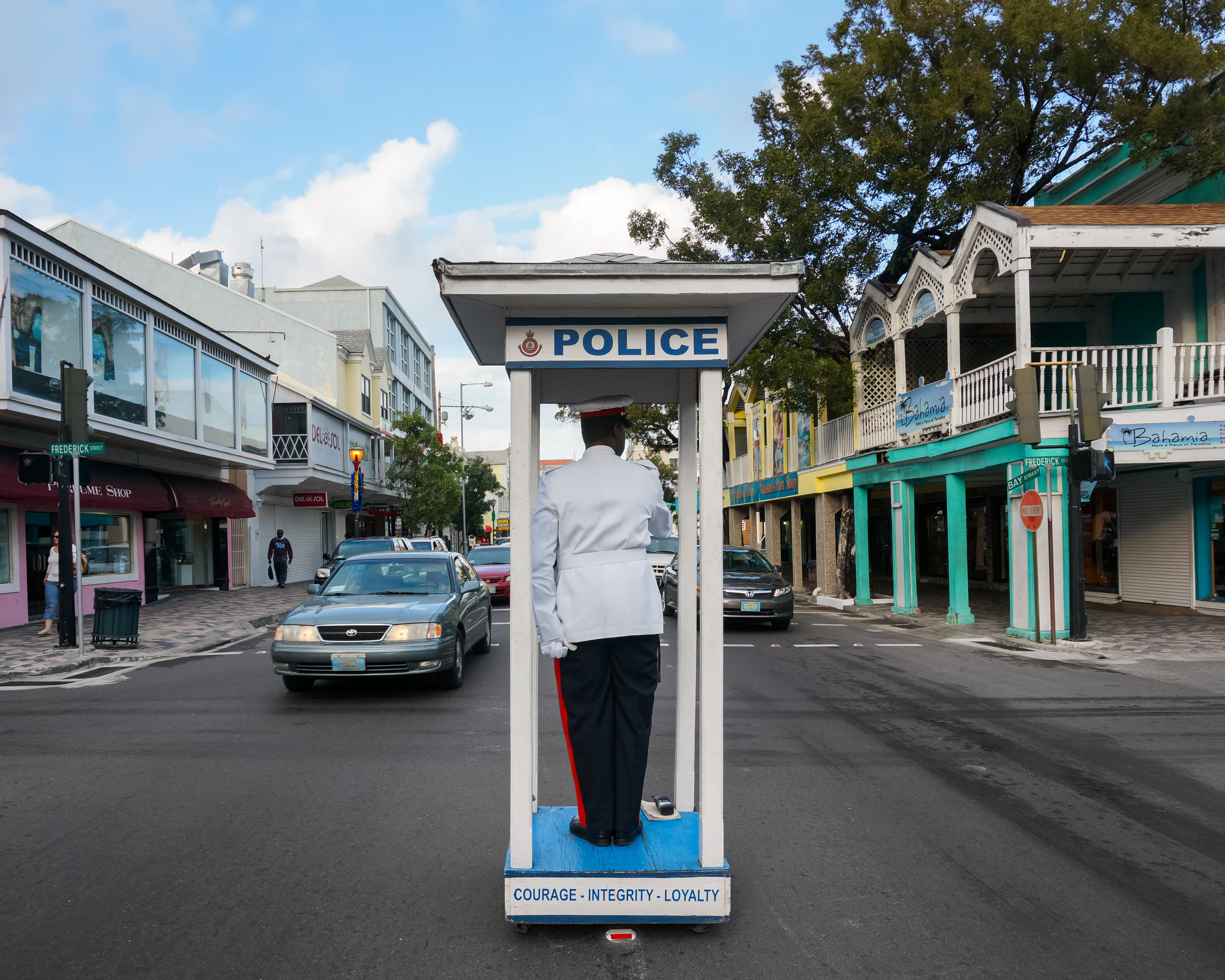
Traffic police at an intersection in Nassau

Traffic police (also known as traffic officers, traffic enforcement officer, traffic enforcement units, traffic cops, traffic monitors, or traffic enforcers) are units and agencies who enforce traffic laws and manage traffic. Traffic police help to assist in patrolling highways, directing traffic and address traffic infractions. They may be a separate agency from a main police agency, a unit or division within a police agency, or a type of assignment issued to officers; they can also be part of a transportation authority or highway authority.

It has been noted that:

...traffic police, who are regarded as peripheral to most police forces, participate in both authoritative intervention and symbolic justice. Perhaps alone of all the assignments, traffic police are full-service police. They are different from the rest, however, because their work is limited to a particular venue—namely, public thoroughfares—and to particular people—namely, those who operate motor vehicles. But in terms of work, traffic police are detectives as well as patrol officers.

== History ==
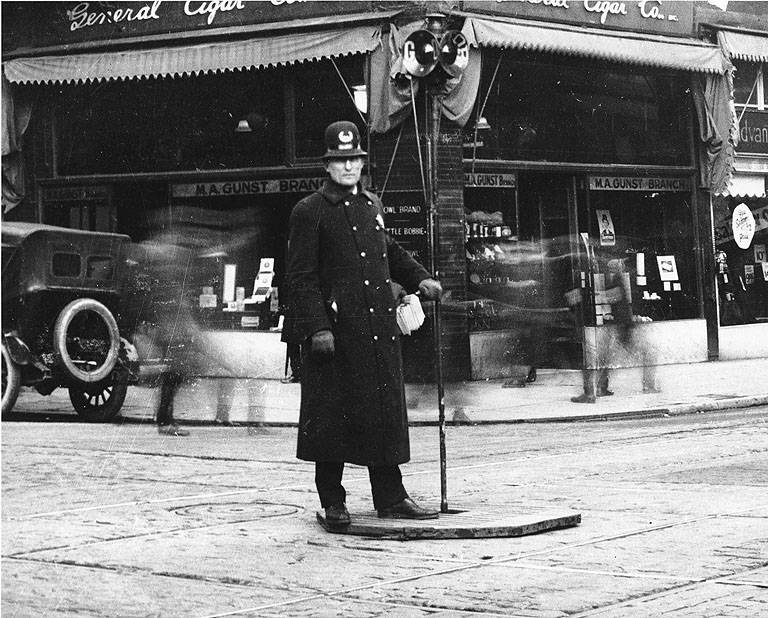
A Seattle Police Department officer directing traffic in downtown Seattle, 1922. Some early intersections featured concrete islands for traffic lights and traffic officers.

Traffic police have existed in some form for nearly three centuries. Possibly the first traffic police force was established in London, England in 1722, when the Lord Mayor of London, in response to an increase in traffic during the 18th century, appointed three men to position themselves on London Bridge and ensure traffic kept to the left side of the road and did not stop in traffic, with the aim of ensuring traffic could continue to flow unabated.

== Enforcement methods ==
=== Traffic direction ===
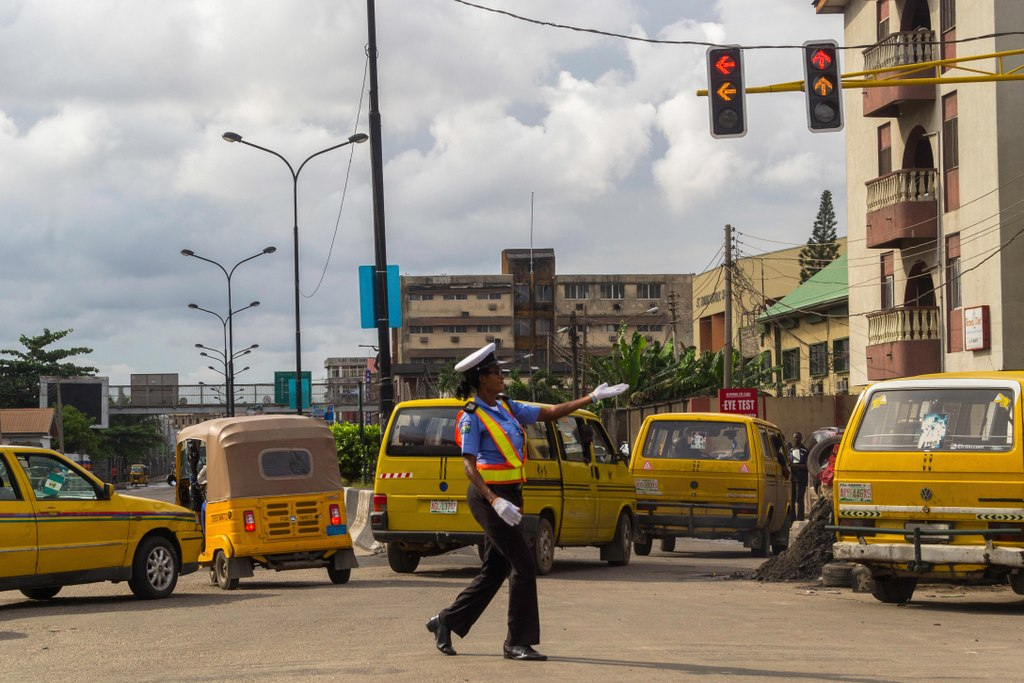
A Nigeria Police Force officer directing traffic at a busy intersection

One of the oldest and most basic forms of traffic policing is directing traffic. This is conducted by a traffic officer (usually only one) who stands in the middle of an intersection, using hand signals and occasionally also a whistle, a handheld traffic sign (usually a stop sign), or a handheld light stick to manage the flow of vehicles and pedestrians. The officer directing traffic is usually a foot patrol officer or an auxiliary officer, though officers with vehicles may also direct traffic, parking their vehicles out of the way. Officers directing traffic typically wear high-visibility clothing to provide visibility and avoid being struck by traffic, ranging from brightly colored uniforms (historically a white patrol cap or helmet with gloves) to neon-colored vests and coats with retroreflective strips.

Though common worldwide before traffic signs and traffic lights became commonplace, traffic direction is now rare in places where traffic lights are the primary mode of traffic management, where it is mostly limited to incidents where roadways are closed or obstructed, traffic is heavier than usual, or traffic lights are disabled or otherwise unavailable, such as during a power outage or at the scene of a traffic collision. Traffic direction continues to be a mainstay in places where traffic lights and signs are not used, or where traffic is so dense that directing traffic is more effective than relying on lights and signs alone.

=== Vehicular enforcement ===
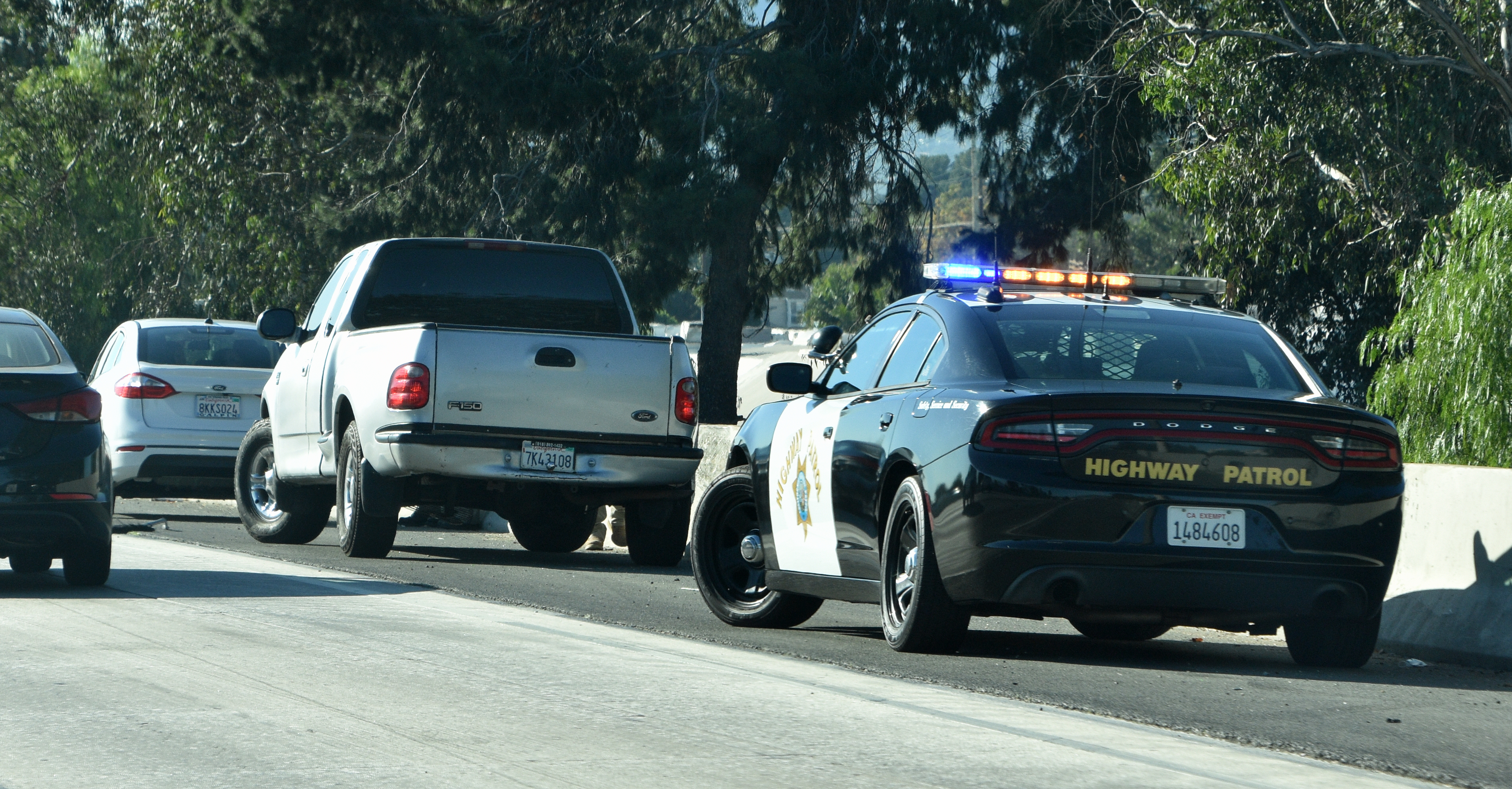
A California Highway Patrol traffic unit conducting a traffic stop

One of the most common forms of traffic policing in the modern day is vehicular enforcement. This is conducted by police officers using vehicles, typically cars or motorcycles but occasionally also aircraft or watercraft, who directly enforce vehicular traffic. Vehicular enforcement is often very similar to regular police patrols, and may be a standard police responsibility in some agencies. Vehicular enforcement usually consists of the enforcement of speed limits, registration and licensing, driving under the influence, commercial vehicle inspection, and other vehicle-related laws and crimes. The most common methods of vehicular enforcement are traffic stops, checkpoints, and "watching traffic" along the shoulder of roadways using radar speed guns.

Some roads may be patrolled by aircraft, a declaration usually posted along such a roadway by the agency operating said aircraft. Though some motorists view this as mere deception used to promote slowing down, police aircraft actually do patrol some freeways, albeit rarely due to the costs in operating aircraft for lengthy periods. To measure a vehicle's speed, the pilots calculate the time it takes to travel between a set of road markings. Should the pilots determine the vehicle is speeding or violating a law, they follow it until a police unit in a land vehicle arrives to initiate a traffic stop.

=== Remote enforcement ===
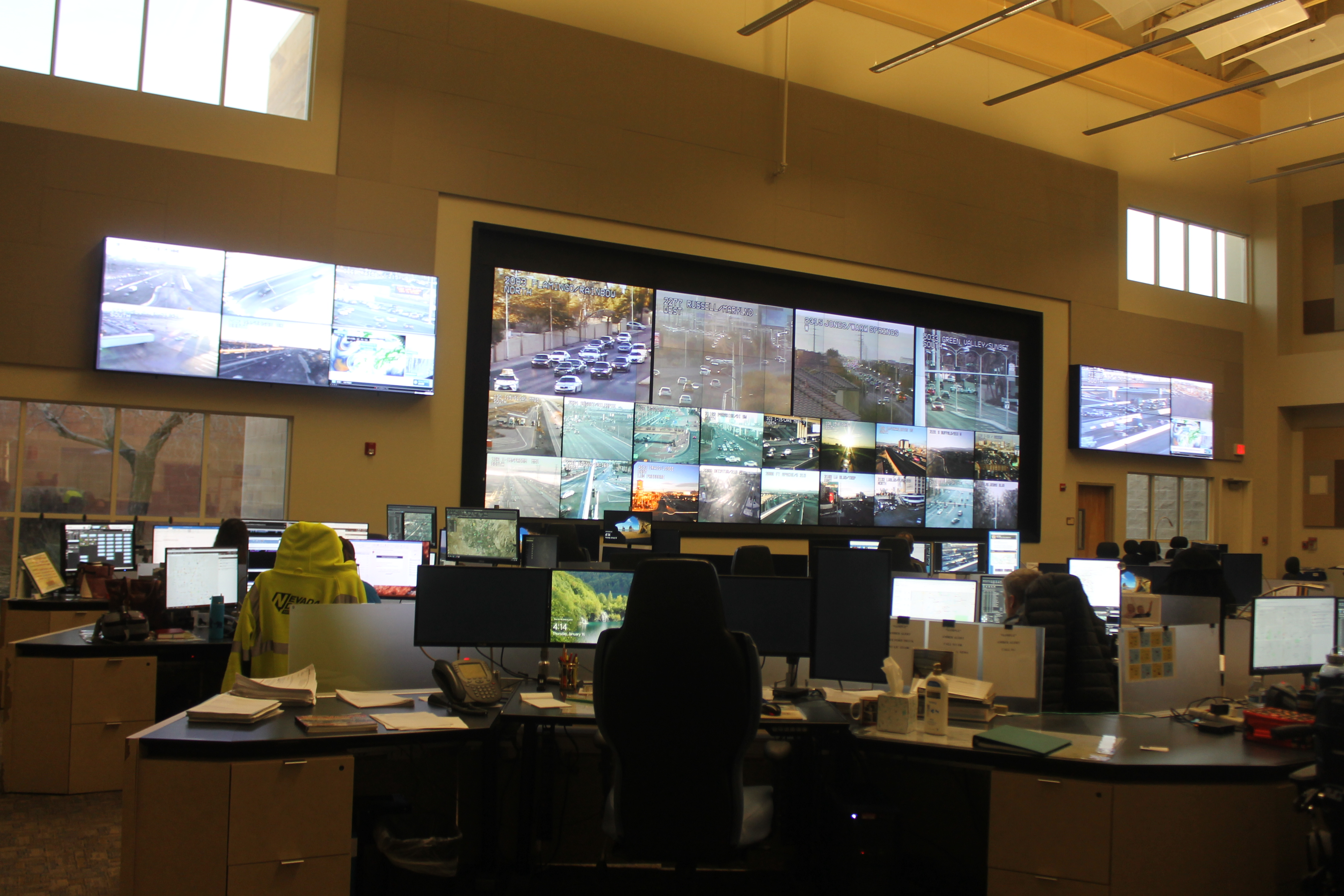
A dispatch center used by the Nevada Department of Transportation and Nevada State Police to monitor highways

Remote traffic enforcement is conducted using traffic enforcement cameras typically installed and managed by a transportation authority, highway authority, or police agency along roadways. These camera feeds are then monitored for visible crimes or incidents such as speeding, reckless driving, or traffic collisions, to which the proper services are then dispatched if needed. Some traffic cameras can automatically read plates to check for registration and licensing infractions or wants and warrants, or even fine the registered owner of the vehicle without having to dispatch a police unit to issue a ticket.

==== Automation ====
In the 2010s, the Congolese National Police deployed automated traffic police robots. Created by Thérèse Kirongozi, an engineer from the Democratic Republic of the Congo, the tall solar-powered aluminum robots are positioned in intersections and are able to rotate, but cannot actually move; rather, they contain closed-circuit television cameras in their "eyes" that record offenders for human traffic officers to handle. The robots also carry red and green lights to direct traffic, and can speak to pedestrians and help them cross roads. Five robots were installed in intersections in Kinshasa by 2015, with thirty more planned for highway patrol purposes.

== Enforcement agencies ==
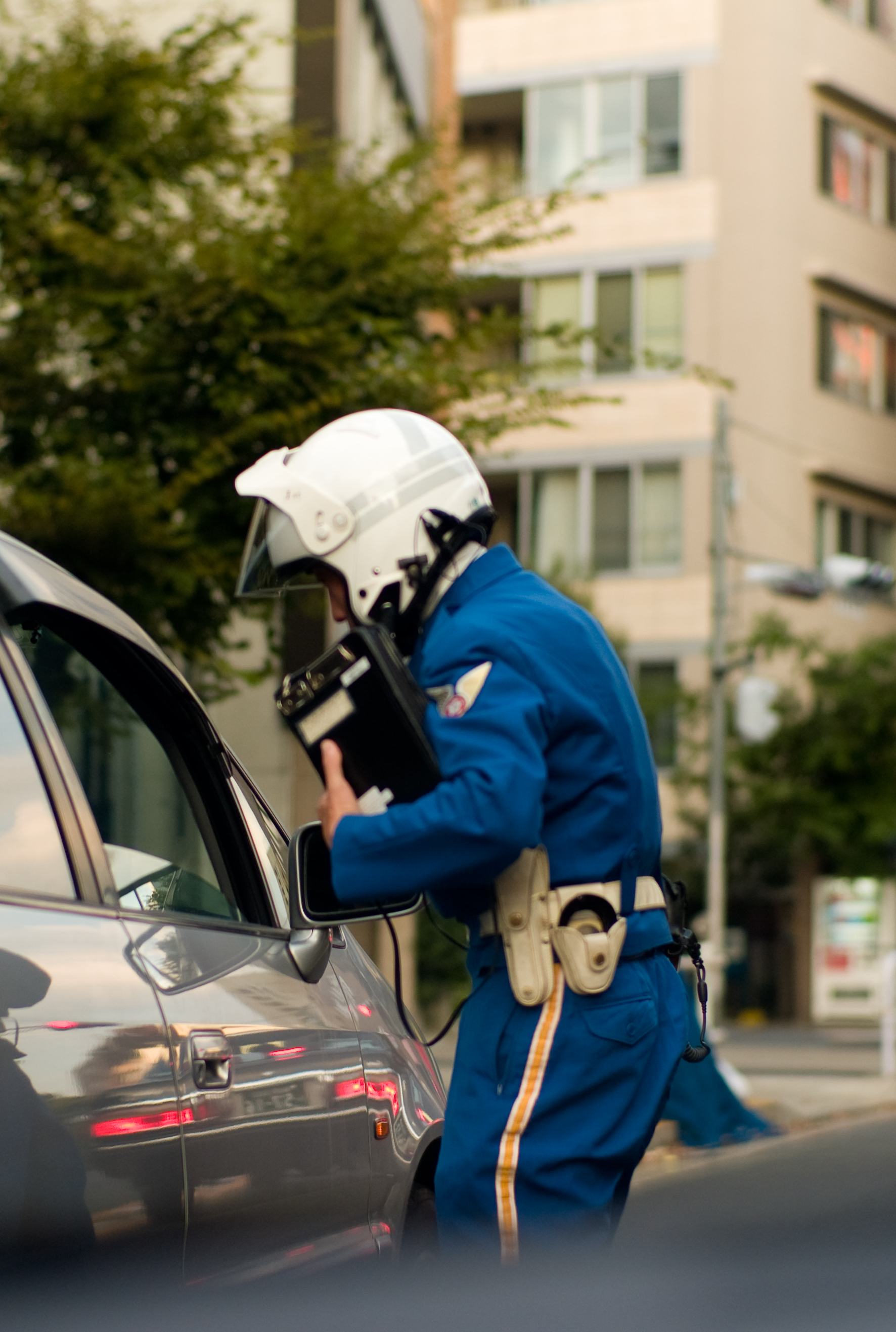
A Japanese prefectural police motorcycle officer questioning a motorist during a traffic stop

Traffic policing is, as its name implies, usually the responsibility of police. Traffic police are often either independent police agencies, units within police agencies, or an assignment given to police officers or auxiliaries. Separate units and agencies usually have the same or similar enforcement powers as regular police, such as arrest powers, though they may or may not lack firearms.

=== Non-police traffic enforcement ===
Some traffic officers are not part of police agencies, and are instead part of transportation authorities, highway authorities, or regulatory boards. They often work alongside police, and may call upon them to handle emergencies or road crimes.

In the United Kingdom, England's National Highways employs traffic officers, as does the Welsh Government, who also employ traffic officers; both are responsible for traffic management and roadside assistance on trunk roads in their respective jurisdictions. In the Philippines, the Land Transportation Office (LTO) and Land Transportation Franchising and Regulatory Board (LTFRB), the agencies under the Department of Transportation and the Public Order and Safety Office of all local government units, enforces a range of vehicular laws. In the United States, some department of transportation (DOT) agencies are able to direct traffic, provide roadside assistance, and enforce traffic laws.

In some instances, civilians and unsworn personnel may be enlisted by police for auxiliary purposes, including traffic policing, while others may take it upon themselves to direct traffic in the absence of the proper authorities. For example, during the Northeast blackout of 2003, citizens in Toronto and New York City directed traffic while traffic lights were disabled. However, in some jurisdictions such as Ontario, such practices are illegal, and only law enforcement and authorized personnel can direct traffic due to liability concerns.

In the United States, there have been some efforts to transfer traffic stop authority to some DOTs as part of police reform initiatives, most prominently in Berkeley, California, which planned to establish "BerkDOT" to enforce minor traffic violations while still allowing the Berkeley Police Department to handle major violations and road crimes. Proponents argue that shifting traffic enforcement from police to DOTs would reduce the chance of escalation in traffic stops, keep traffic enforcement related to traffic without police criminal record checks, and allow police to focus more on criminal concerns.

== See also ==
- Roads Policing Unit
- Traffic guard
- State police
- Security police
- Security guard
- Parking enforcement officer
- Highway patrol
- Crossing guard
- Level crossing
- Road traffic control
- Road traffic safety
- Roadworks
- Traffic barrier
- Traffic cadet
