= Enoch Numbi Ngoie =

Congolese major general

- Allegiance: Democratic Republic of the Congo
- Branch: DR Congo Air Force
- Service years: ?—present
- Rank: Major general
- Commands: Air Force

Enoch Numbi Ngoie is a Congolese major general who is serving as the Chief of Staff of the Air Force of the Democratic Republic of the Congo, since 2014. Formerly he served as the Deputy Chief of Air Force Staff for operations since at least 2007. In July 2018 he was promoted from brigadier general to major general.

He is related to former head of the Congolese National Police, General John Numbi.
