= Massamba =

Massamba is a Congolese surname. Notable people with the surname include:

- Alphonse Massamba-Débat (1921–1977), Congolese politician
- David Massamba (born 1992), Gabonese football player
- Kilasu Massamba (1950–2020), Congolese football player
- Rigobert Massamba Musungu, major general in the Air Force of the Democratic Republic of the Congo
- Thomas Massamba (born 1985), Swedish-Congolese basketball playe
