= Ronny Coutteure =

Belgian actor (1951–2000)

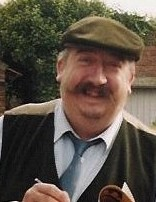
- Born: Ronny Louis Edmond Coutteure; 2 July 1951; Wervik, Flanders, Belgium
- Died: 21 June 2000 (aged 48); Fretin, France
- Occupations: Actor, director, author, TV presenter, restaurateur
- Years active: 1972–2000
- Spouses: Dianne van den Eijnden; Colette Talpaert

Ronny Louis Edmond Coutteure (2 July 1951 – 21 June 2000) was a Belgian actor, director, author, TV presenter and restaurateur and worked in cinema, radio, television, opera and theatre. He was a celebrity in his home-country of Belgium and in France, but is most famous internationally for his supporting role of Remy Baudouin, comrade-in-arms of Indiana Jones in The Young Indiana Jones Chronicles.

== Career ==
In theater, Ronny Coutteure staged and performed several works. He was the proprietor of the "pub-theatre" La ferme des hirondelles (Swallow Farm) in Fretin in northern France and he wrote and directed an opera, Les Contes d'un buveur de bière (Tales of a beer drinker) as well as teaching "biérologie" ("beer-ology"). Coutteure was a strong supporter of the culture and heritage of northern France and became a symbol of the culture of the frontier region with Belgium.

== Death ==
He committed suicide by hanging on 21 June 2000 at La ferme des hirondelles at the age of 48, shortly after France 3 announced the cancellation of his show Ronny coup de cœur.

== Radio / Television ==
- 1998 : Écouteuses, écouteurs, écoutez : Daily show on the Radio Fréquence Nord
- 1998-2000 : Ronny coup de cœur : TV Show on the TV Channel France 3 Nord-Pas-de-Calais-Picardie

== Filmography ==
Year	Title	Role	Director	Notes
1974	La Colonie	Persimet	Bernard Claeys	TV movie
1974	Billenium	The official	Jean-Claude de Nesle	TV movie
1976	Mini-chroniques	A railroad	Jean-Marie Coldefy	TV series (1 episode)
1976	Cinéma 16	Doudou	Gérard Chouchan & Maurice Failevic	TV series (2 episodes)
1977	Inutile d'envoyer photo	The postman	Alain Dhouailly	TV movie
1979	Le dernier train	Marcel's help	Jacques Krier	TV movie
1979	Les yeux bleus		François Dupont-Midi	TV mini-series
1980	Les aventures d'Yvon Dikkebusch	Yvon Dikkebush	Maurice Failevic (2)	TV movie Also writer
1980	Les amours de la belle époque	The Marigo	Dominique Giuliani	TV series (1 episode)
1981	Être heureux sans le bonheur	Gros Quinquin	Jacques Trébouta	TV movie
1981	Minitrip	Marcel	Pierre Joassin	TV movie
1981	Julien Fontanes, magistrat	Albert	François Dupont-Midi (2)	TV series (1 episode)
1981	Cinéma 16	The professor	Jacques Trébouta (2)	TV series (1 episode)
1982	Bonbons en gros	Paul Lepeu	François Dupont-Midi (3)	TV movie Also writer
1982	L'adélaïde	Writer	Patrick Villechaize	TV movie
1982	Merci Bernard	Various	Jean-Michel Ribes	TV series (10 episodes)
1983	Un dimanche de flic	Arm seller	Michel Vianey	
1983	Zig Zag Story	Romo	Patrick Schulmann	
1983	Winter 1960	Albert	Thierry Michel	
1983	Croquignole	Paulat	Jean Brard	TV movie
1983	Le dancing	Popol	Jean-Louis Colmant	TV movie
1984	L'instit	Paul Fougerolle	Gérard Gozlan	TV series (1 episode); Also writer
1984	L'appartement	Roger Pintoni	Dominique Giuliani (2)	TV series (1 episode)
1984	Cinéma 16	Antoine	François Dupont-Midi (4)	TV series (1 episode); Also writer
1985	Fort bloqué	Gérard	Pierrick Guinard	TV movie
1985	Mort carnaval	The hotelier	Daniel Van Cutsem	TV movie
1985	Bachou	Bachou	Alain Dhouailly (2)	TV movie
1986	Cinéma 16	Valentin Vanderlove	François Dupont-Midi (5)	TV series (1 episode); Also writer
1987	Série noire	Gégé	Serge Moati	TV series (1 episode)
1987	Carnaval	N'a pus	Ronny Coutteure	
1988	Gros coeurs	Albert	Pierre Joassin (2)	
1988	Deux de conduite	Albert	François Dupont-Midi (6)	TV mini-series
1989	Maria Vandamme	Alois Quaghebeur	Jacques Ertaud	TV mini-series
1989	Blueberry Hill	Valère	Robbe De Hert	
1989	Palace	The waiter	Jean-Michel Ribes (2)	TV series (1 episode)
1989	Pentimento	Gaby	Tonie Marshall	
1989	La vierge noire	Paul	Igaal Niddam	TV mini-series
1990	Bal perdu	The innkeeper	Daniel Benoin	
1991	Faux frère		Vincent Martorana	TV Short
1992	The Young Indiana Jones Chronicles	Remy Baudouin	Carl Schultz, Simon Wincer, ...	TV series (9 episodes)
1992	Puissance 4	Writer	Charles L. Bitsch	TV series (1 episode)
1993	La cavale des fous	The driver	Marco Pico	
1995	Le roi de Paris	Emile	Dominique Maillet	
1995	V'la l'cinéma ou le roman de Charles Pathé	Gaujac	Jacques Rouffio	TV movie
1995	Het verdriet van België	Nonkel Robert	Claude Goretta	TV mini-series
1995	Maigret	Commissioner Mansuy	Pierre Joassin (3)	TV series (1 episode)
1996	Les mercredis de la vie	Robert Van Bersen	Dominique Baron	TV series (1 episode); Also writer
1997	Arlette	Arlette's boss	Claude Zidi	
1998	Louise et les marchés	Audoin	Marc Rivière	TV mini-series
2000	Marion et son tuteur	Pierre Maréchal	Jean Larriaga	TV movie
2000	Les enfants du printemps	Francis Gluckstein	Marco Pico (2)	TV mini-series
2001	Thérèse et Léon	Léon Jouhaux	Claude Goretta (2)	TV movie (final film role)

== Theatre ==
Year	Title	Author	Director	Notes
1972	Masques de Jeux	Ronny Coutteure	Ronny Coutteure	One man show
1975	Arlequin au pays noir	Ronny Coutteure	Ronny Coutteure	
1976	Martin Eden	Jack London	Ronny Coutteure	
1977	Courteline, son église...	Ronny Coutteure	Ronny Coutteure	
1978	La Périchole	Jacques Offenbach	Ronny Coutteure	
1978	Belges Histoires	Ronny Coutteure	Ronny Coutteure	One man show
1981	L'Échappé Belges	Ronny Coutteure	Ronny Coutteure	One man show
1982	Les Bas-fonds	Maxim Gorky	Lucian Pintilie	
1983	La Station Champbaudet	Eugène Labiche	Ronny Coutteure	
1984	Mince Alors	Ronny Coutteure	Ronny Coutteure	One man show
1985	La Route fleurie	Francis Lopez	Ronny Coutteure	
1985	Guerre aux Asperges	Pierre Louki	Ronny Coutteure	
1988	Woyzeck	Georg Büchner	Daniel Benoin	
1988	Drames et plaisenteries	Anton Chekhov	Ronny Coutteure (12)	
1990	Guerre aux Asperges	Pierre Louki	Daniel Benoin (2)	
1991	Salut, les comiques	Ronny Coutteure	Ronny Coutteure	
1992	Éloge de la Bière	Ronny Coutteure	Ronny Coutteure	One man show
1993-94	Le mal court	Jacques Audiberti	Pierre Franck	
1995	L'Hôtel du libre échange	Georges Feydeau	Jean-Georges Tharaud	
1996	L'Entrée du Christ à Tourcoing	Ronny Coutteure	Ronny Coutteure (15)	One man show

== Author ==
- 1981 : De Belges histoires
- 1992 : D'amoureuses histoires
- 1997 : Le temps de la bière
- 1997-98 : Lucasfilm magazine

== Discography ==
- 1980 : Eul' bibine à Fredo
- 1981 : Ils sont fous ces Français
- 1983 : Il y a du soleil à Lille
- 1984 : Le Roi du smurf
- 1989 : Pietje Lamelut et autres histoires
- 1994 : Contes d'un buveur de bière
