= Kitona Air Base =

- IATA: none; ICAO: FZAI

Summary
- Airport type: Military
- Operator: Air Force of the Democratic Republic of the Congo
- Location: Kitona, Democratic Republic of Congo
- Elevation AMSL: 394 ft (120 m)
- Coordinates: 05°55′05″S 012°26′51″E

Map
- Location within DRC

Runways
Direction	Length		Surface
Direction	m	ft	Surface
05/23	2,400	7,874	Paved

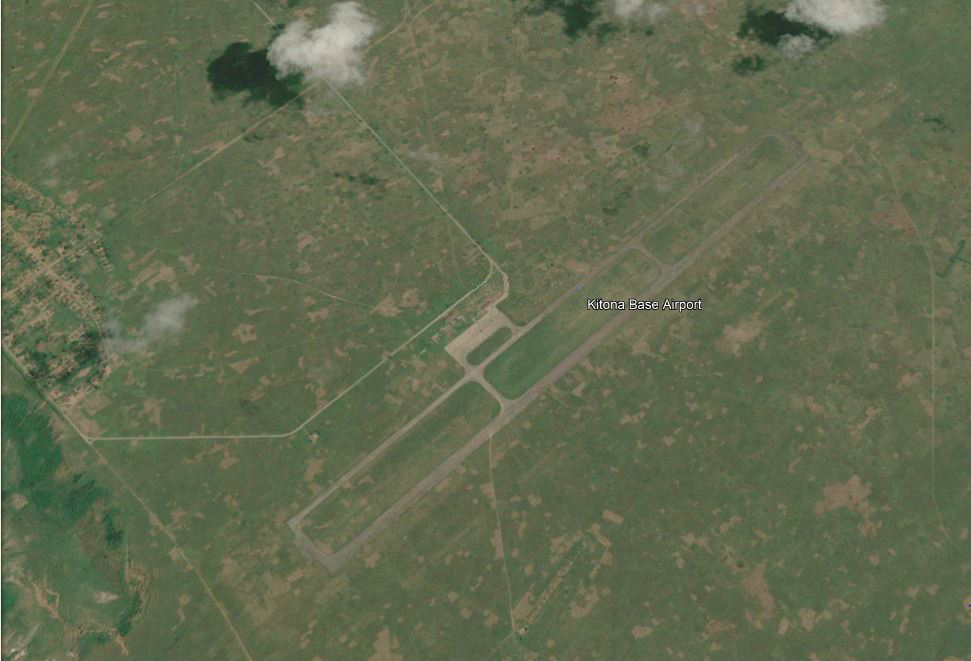
Aerial view of Kitona Air Base

Kitona Air Base (ICAO: FZAI) is a military airport located near Kitona in the Democratic Republic of Congo. Up until 2007, it was commanded by Major General Rigobert Massamba Musungu of the DR Congolese Air Force.

== Facilities ==
The airport resides at an elevation of 394 feet (120 m) above mean sea level. It has one runway designed 05/23 with a paved surface measuring 2,400 by 45 metres (7,874 ft × 148 ft).

== See also ==
- Air Force of the Democratic Republic of the Congo
