= Thérèse Kirongozi =

Congolese engineer (born 1973)

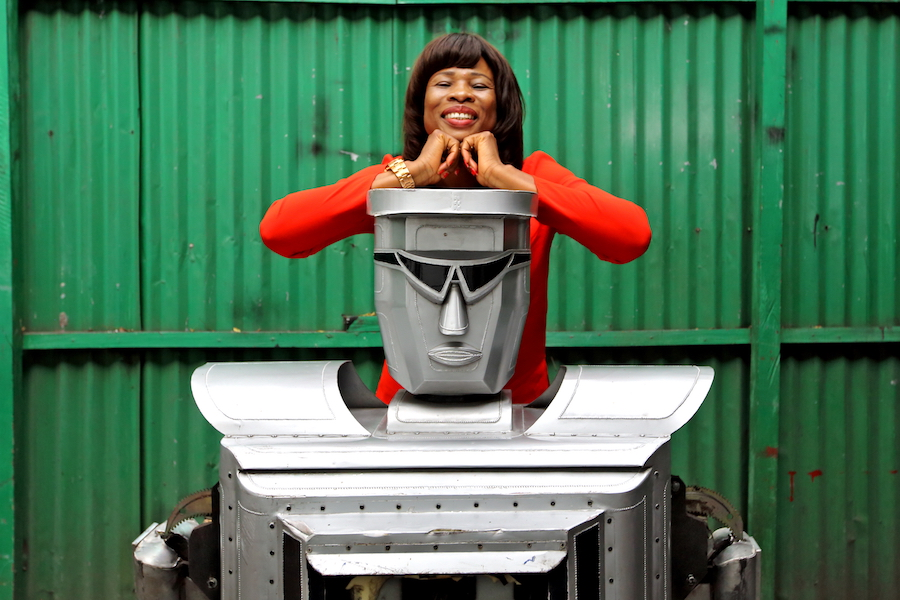
- Thérèse Kirongozi with her traffic robot
- Born: Thérèse Izay Kirongozi; 3 June 1973 (age 52); Kinshasa, Zaire
- Occupations: Industrial engineer, entrepreneur
- Years active: 2013
- Known for: Humanoid traffic robots

Thérèse Izay Kirongozi (born 3 June 1973) is a Congolese industrial engineer. She is notable for designing traffic robots that were initially placed in two locations in Kinshasa towards the end of 2013. By 2015 five robots were in use in Kinshasa and one in Lubumbashi. The use of robots as traffic lights may be unique to the Democratic Republic of Congo. (Note: Anthropomorphic, non-robotic figures have often been used, notably in Germany, to indicate roadworks. Their human-like appearance is considered to encourage drivers to slow down more than a simple sign.)

== Early life ==
Kirongozi was born in Kinshasa, Zaire (now the Democratic Republic of Congo) on 3 June 1973. She studied in her hometown before starting undergraduate studies at the Higher Institute of Applied Techniques. From an early age, Kirongozi had an interest in traffic safety after witnessing her brother being crushed by a vehicle.

== Traffic robots ==
Kirongozi is known for her development of humanoid robots that regulate traffic in Kinshasa. The idea for traffic robots first came to Kirongozi and a few of her peers at the Higher Institute of Applied Technique. Kirongozi has stated she was motivated by the ease with which people could speed, run red lights, and flee or bribe their way out of consequences. She wanted something more reliable and incorruptible on the roads to enforce traffic laws. Robots, she thought, could make sure that people were accountable to the rule of law, and could help the state recoup some revenue, potentially funding further infrastructure developments. The robots are manufactured by Women's Technology (Wotech), an association headed by Kirongozi.

=== Early stages and design ===
The first generation of robots was commissioned in 2013 and cost about 15,000 dollars each to manufacture, while the latest generation unveiled on 4 March 2015, cost about 27,500 dollars each. They weigh 250 kg (550 lb) each, are 2.5 metres (8 ft 2 in) high and are made of aluminium to better withstand the equatorial climate. The autonomy of the robots is provided by a solar panel placed over their head. The solar panels that power the robots could prove a major asset in a city where whole districts still lack electrical power. Made of aluminium, the robots are designed to resist a harsh equatorial climate with high temperatures, humidity and massive downpours. These humanoid traffic robots can rotate their chest and raise their arms like a human traffic officer would do to stop vehicles in one direction, and allow their flow in another one. Some of these robots can detect pedestrians and are programmed to “speak” to tell them when the road can be crossed or not. When they wait to cross, he sings a song that recalls the principles of road traffic. The first goal is to implement the humanoid robots all around Kinshasa, but to achieve this, according to some experts, it is necessary to mobilize 12 million US dollars because Kinshasa has about 600 strategic and dangerous intersections, the price of a robot oscillating between 10,000 and US$20,000, including the cost of maintenance.

=== Expansion ===
After two prototypes installed in 2013, three "new generation" robots were delivered to the capital in March, and five to the Katangese authorities, including three in Lubumbashi. "This is a positive thing ... in the business of road safety. We need to multiply these intelligent robots to install them at various intersections in the towns and urban agglomerations of our country," said Val Manga, head of the National Road Safety Commission. The selling price of a unit is around 25,000 dollars (about 22,000 euros) and varies according to the autonomy of its solar panels. Society does not fall asleep on its laurels; the company is developing and evolving its technology. "The robot sends the police, in real-time, the images filmed by its cameras. We use a radio beam, but eventually, we will switch to fibre optics. The transmission of images will be much faster, "says the project manager. An "intelligent" traffic cop robot has been installed in the city of Lubumbashi in the Democratic Republic of Congo. Local residents seem enthusiastic about the robot, which replaces Lubumbashi's traffic police and also has surveillance cameras to observe traffic offences, regional broadcaster Nyota says. It comes the year after two similar solar-powered robots were set up at intersections in the capital city Kinshasa, attracting attention at the time. However, there are some worries about whether the robots will be maintained properly, given that many of Lubumbashi's traffic lights have fallen into disrepair, UN-sponsored Radio Okapi reports.

Several other Congolese cities want to acquire these automata, there is at least one in Goma. And Women's Technologies also intends to export. Angola, Congo, Ivory Coast and Nigeria are interested. When is the presence of the first humanoid agents made in DR Congo in these countries? "The talks are very advanced," says the head of the company. She hopes other countries will follow suit. She would like to see these "robots Made in Congo" in New York. "That's my dream. I dream big," she told Radio Okapi in February 2014.

Tamuke, Mwaluke and Kisanga are the names given to the last three robots developed by Kirongozi and her team. They were purchased by the police authorities and handed over on 4 March 2015. There are at least five of them that are regulating traffic in Kinshasa.

=== Innovation ===
The new generation of robots conceived by the inventor has cameras set in their “eyes” and “shoulders” that film traffic continuously. Thanks to the antenna fixed on top of their head, data can be transmitted to a control center via an Internet Protocol (IP) transmission. Kirongozi is already envisioning the manufacturing of robot soldiers, road cleaning robots, robots that can intervene in a toxic environment, etc. She is proof that women have an important role to play in the industrialization process of the African continent, and that they are just as talented as men.

=== Reception ===
The local population accepted the robots enthusiastically. An editorial writer, Sam Sturgis, acknowledged the benefits the robots bring to managing traffic but also raised concerns that they may take attention away from the issue of uncontrolled urban expansion on the outskirts of the city. Brian Sokol, a photographer for Panos Pictures, observed, "People on the streets seem to obey the robots in a way that they don't obey human traffic officers at busy intersections in Kinshasa."

The government of the Democratic Republic of Congo was satisfied with the performance of the robots and as a result, added three more units to the city of Kinshasa (Women's Technology named them Kisanga, Mwaluke, and Tamuke) and sent five to the southeastern mining district of Katanga, at a cost of $27,500 per robot. These new models are supposed to react more quickly than previous ones and have speed radars. Kirongozi, a traffic engineer, submitted a proposal to the government for purchasing an additional 30 traffic robots, which are expected to pay for themselves through decreased accident costs and increased fines, and also replace unreliable human traffic officers at a lower cost. One of the claimed advantages of the robots is that, unlike local traffic police, they are not susceptible to bribery. Their human-like appearance is also believed to encourage drivers to slow down more than a simple sign. Celestin Kanyama, chief of Kinshasa's police force, said the new electronic officers were a valuable addition to the city, where 2,276 people have died in traffic accidents since 2007. However, Kinshasa governor Andre Kimbuta stated that while the machines could regulate traffic, they were not a replacement for real policemen who could chase after motorists who jump red lights and raise civic awareness.
