= Kamina Air Base =

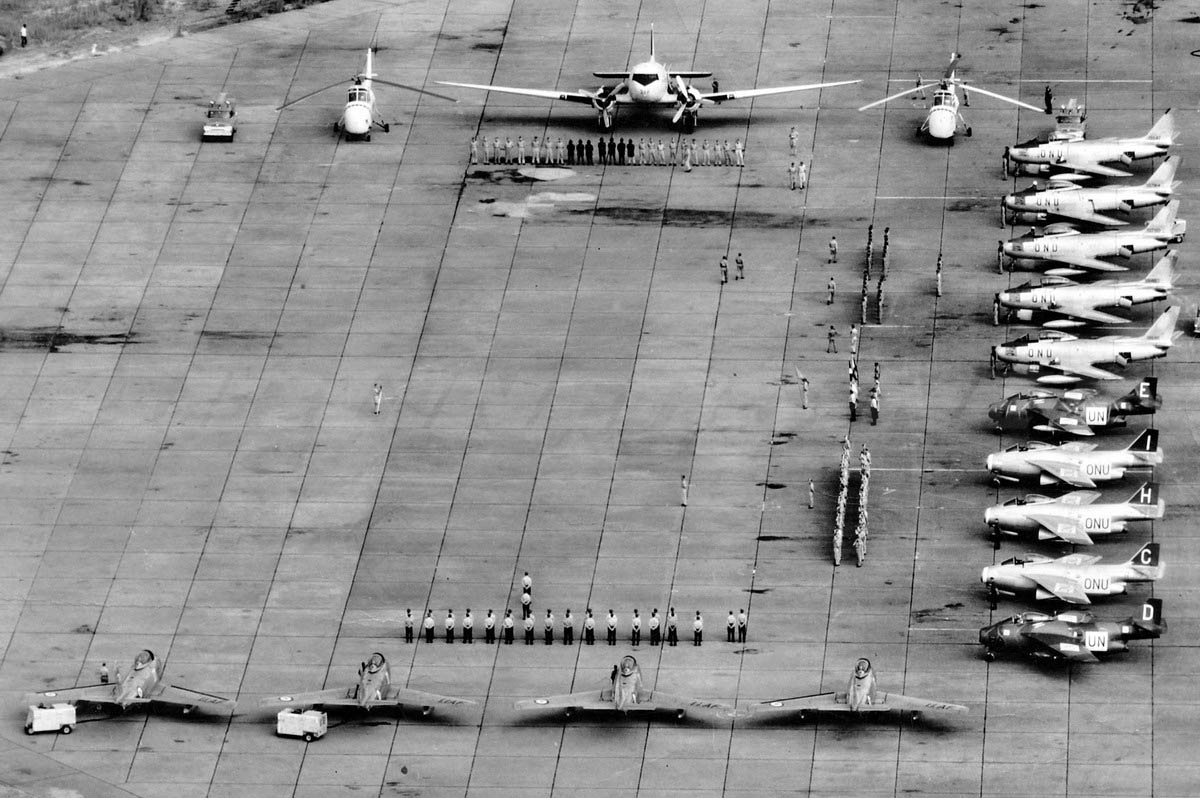
- IATA: none; ICAO: FZSA

Summary
- Airport type: Military
- Operator: Air Force of the Democratic Republic of the Congo
- Location: Kamina, Democratic Republic of the Congo
- Elevation AMSL: 3,543 ft (1,080 m)
- Coordinates: 08°38′31″S 025°15′10″E
- Interactive map of Kamina Air Base

Runways
Direction	Length		Surface
Direction	m	ft	Surface
13L/31R	2,700	8,858	Asphalt
13R/31L	2,700	8,858	Asphalt

Kamina Air Base (ICAO: FZSA) is a military airport located near Kamina in the Democratic Republic of the Congo.

It was built as part of the Belgian near-national-redoubt concept after World War II. Susan Williams in her book White Malice: The CIA and the Neocolonisation of Africa writes the following concerning the goals of the military base at its founding:

The Kamina military base in western Katanga - some 200 miles from Shinkolobwe and 260 miles from Elisabethville - had been built in 1952 by Belgium, supported by NATO funding. (...) It was Shinkolobwe, observed an American journalist, that was 'Kamina's raison d'etre'. According to an article in the New York Herald Tribune in 1955, the Kamina base had two 'global missions'. One of these was to 'protect Belgium's rich uranium mines at Shinkolobwe' and its rich copper deposits in the same general area. The other was 'to form a nucleus for the protection of the entire southern half of Africa, and probably extend that protection even further, should another world war occur'.

It accommodated ONUC military aircraft during the Congo Crisis.

== Facilities ==
The airport resides at an elevation of 3,543 feet (1,080 m) above mean sea level. It has two runways, each with an asphalt surface measuring 2,700 by 45 metres (8,858 ft × 148 ft).

== See also ==
- Kamina Airport
- Air Force of the Democratic Republic of the Congo
