= Métamorphose d'une gare =

- Directed by: Thierry Michel
- Written by: Thierry Michel, Christine Pireaux
- Narrated by: Thierry Michel
- Music by: Audio Network PLC, A-Music
- Production companies: Les Films de la Passerelle, RTBF
- Release date: November 2010 (Cork Film Festival)
- Running time: 80 minutes
- Country: Belgium
- Language: French

Métamorphose d'une gare (English: Metamorphosis of a Station) is a 2010 documentary film directed by Thierry Michel that follows the construction of the modern new railway station of Guillemins in Liège, Belgium.

== Plot ==
The new Guillemins station in Liège was a huge project undertaken by the Spanish architect Santiago Calatrava, who had already directed construction of stations in Zurich, Lisbon and Lyon. The site presented many challenges. The film follows the project from start to end over a nine-year period. It documents the issues, frictions and tension of the project as well as the pride and enthusiasm of the people involved. The result was a modern cathedral of European high-speed rail. The project was controversial, being criticized as being too grandiose, too expensive to maintain and not well-adapted to the Belgian climate. In the process many old buildings were destroyed and the whole neighborhood was disrupted.

== Reception ==
The film was shown at the Cork Film Festival in November 2010. It has been called a unique experience which Thierry Michel reveals each of the key moments that made a utopia into reality. However, a reviewer complained about the lack of background on what led up to the project and lack of analysis of the impact of the station, saying Thierry Michel's film is nothing but a tissue of anecdotes. Another says that, fascinated by the technical challenges, Thierry Michel sees the men involved with a less clear eye. He portrays Santiago Calatrava as a man of dazzling ideas, but does not show how he is involved in the realities of the work. The prime contractor, Vincent Bourlard, is shown as having endless energy, perhaps more than is realistic.
