= John Numbi =

Congolese military officer and former police chief (born 1962)

John Numbi Tambo Banza

Inspector General of the Congolese Armed Forces
- In office July 2018 – July 2020
- President: Joseph Kabila
- Prime Minister: Bruno Tshibala
- Preceded by: Rigobert Massamba

Inspector General of the Congolese National Police
- In office ? – January 2010
- President: Joseph Kabila
- Prime Minister: Augustin Matata Ponyo
- Succeeded by: Charles Bisengimana

Military service
- Branch/service: Congolese Air Force; Congolese National Police
- Rank: Major general
- Commands: Congolese Air Force; Congolese National Police
- Battles/wars: Kimia II Operation

John Numbi (born 1962) is a Congolese former military officer and police chief and retainer of Joseph Kabila, who served as the Inspector General of the Congolese National Police until January 2010. In 2018, he was appointed as the Inspector General of the Armed Forces of the Democratic Republic of the Congo (FARDC), and was replaced in that role in 2020 and fled the Congo after Joseph Kabila's power dwindled in the first quarter of 2021.

== History ==
John Numbi was born in 1962 in Haut-Lomami (North-Katanga) and belongs to the Luba/Lubakat ethnic group, like former President Laurent-Désiré Kabila. He met the latter in 1989 then sympathized with his son Joseph Kabila. Politically active, he was an organizer of the youth militia of the Union of Federalists and Independent Republicans (UFERI), which was used by former governor Gabriel Kyungu wa Kumwanza against Luba supporters of the Union for Democracy and Social Progress in the late 1990s.

He rose under the presidency of Laurent-Désiré Kabila. Jeune Afrique commented "little by little, he made his way.. : in charge of communication for a company, then in a brigade, Numbi will find himself director of communications for the army of the new power," and then commander of the 50th Brigade responsible for security in the city of Kinshasa. In 2000, he held the rank of Brigadier General and was the commander for military Region 4 (Katanga). After the president's death, his successor Joseph Kabila appointed him chief of staff of the air force in March 2001.

In November 2006, the Armed Forces of the Democratic Republic of the Congo's offensive against the armed National Congress for the Defence of the People (CNDP) had stalled. Numbi, then commander of the Congolese air force, was sent in Goma to negotiate with CNDP commander Laurent Nkunda. The talks were moved on 31 December to Kigali, where they were facilitated by senior Rwandan officers, including Chief of Staff Gen. James Kabarebe. In early January, an agreement was reached, the terms of which included that Nkunda's forces would be subject to mixage with government units in North Kivu, and eventually deployed outside the province. On 14 February 2007, in reaction to increasing international criticism of the use of child soldiers, Numbi was among a group of senior officers who issued a notice to commanders of mixed brigades that they would be held responsible for the illegal presence of children in their units.

In June 2007, he was appointed Inspector General of the Congolese National Police.

On 26 February 2008, Numbi met with Interior Minister Denis Kalume and President Joseph Kabila to discuss Bundu Dia Kongo (BDK), an unarmed religious movement that had been engaged in violent demonstrations for greater political independence in Bas Kongo. Two days later, 600 police officers armed with machine guns and grenades were deployed from Kinshasa to repress the group. This action was criticized by United Nations Mission in the Democratic Republic of Congo as an excessive use of force. In 2009, Numbi and Kabarebe of Rwanda managed Operations Kimia II and Umoja Wetu, a joint operation against Democratic Forces for the Liberation of Rwanda forces operating in eastern Congo.

Historian Gérard Prunier in a 2009 publication states that Numbi, along with Augustin Katumba Mwanke, Samba Kaputo, Kalume and Marcellin Cishambo, are the "old palace guard" who "are the ones actually running things" in the Congolese government. Prunier further asserts that this group has "a vested interest in 'personally fruitful' stagnation."

On 28 September 2016, Numbi received United States sanctions because he used "violent intimidation" to secure victories for his favored candidates in 2016 provincial elections. U.S. citizens are now barred from conducting financial transactions with him. The measures were seen as a warning to president Joseph Kabila to respect the country's constitution.

In July 2020, Numbi was replaced as Inspector General of the Armed Forces of the Democratic Republic of Congo by Gabriel Amisi Kumba.

At the beginning of 2021, first, Numbi was implicated in the Chebeya affair. Secondly, the change of political majority reduced the power of former President Joseph Kabila, to whom Numbi is very close. In March 2021, according to several sources and press articles, Numbi fled the country, either to Zambia or to Zimbabwe.

In April 2021, John Numbi was officially prosecuted by military justice for "criminal association" and "assassination of Floribert Chebeya and Fidèle Bazana." He was declared a deserter.

In August 2021, heavy weapons were discovered in the residence formerly occupied by John Numbi in Kinshasa. An arsenal capable of equipping an entire battalion, according to military sources. The town planning authorities turned to Military Justice to recover the property where John Numbi had lived, a state house without title or guarantee.
