= Winter 1960 =

1982 film

- Directed by: Thierry Michel
- Written by: Thierry Michel
- Produced by: Thierry Coene
- Starring: Philippe Léotard
- Cinematography: Walther Vanden Ende
- Release date: July 1983
- Running time: 90 minutes
- Country: Belgium
- Language: French

Winter 1960 (French: Hiver 60) is a 1983 Belgian drama film directed by Thierry Michel. It was entered into the 13th Moscow International Film Festival.

== Cast ==
- Philippe Léotard as André
- Christian Barbier as Le père d'André
- Marcel Dossogne as Charles
- Paul Louka as Fred
- Ronny Coutteure as Albert
- Jenny Clève as Nelly - la mère d'André
