= Mobutu, King of Zaire =

Mobutu, King of Zaïre
- Directed by: Thierry Michel
- Produced by: Les Films de la Passerelle (Belgium); Les Films d'Ici (France)
- Narrated by: Thierry Michel
- Release date: 1999
- Running time: 135 min
- Country: Belgium
- Languages: French; Dutch; English

Mobutu, King of Zaire (orig. French title: Mobutu, roi du Zaïre) is a 1999 documentary film about Mobutu Sese Seko, the long-time President of Zaire (now known as the Democratic Republic of the Congo).

== Awards ==
- Mention of honor in "Seen by Africa" on 1999 - Montreal - Canada
- Nominee in Los Angeles by international Documentary Association (IDA) for the IDA Awards - United States
- Special mention during the delivery of European Films Awards for Berlin - Germany
