= Air Force of the Democratic Republic of the Congo =

Air warfare branch of the Democratic Republic of the Congo's military

Congolese Air Force
- Force Aérienne Congolaise
- Congolese Air Force roundel
- Founded: 1961; 65 years ago
- Country: Democratic Republic of the Congo
- Type: Air force
- Role: Aerial warfare
- Size: 2,550 personnel 53 aircraft
- Part of: Congolese Armed Forces
- Headquarters: Ndolo Airport

Commanders
- Commander-in-Chief: President Félix Tshisekedi
- Chief of Staff: Maj. Gen. Franck Ngama

Insignia
- Roundel

- Fin flash

Aircraft flown
- Attack: Sukhoi Su-25
- Fighter: MiG-23
- Attack helicopter: Mil Mi-24
- Cargo helicopter: Mil Mi-26
- Observation helicopter: Alouette III
- Utility helicopter: Bell UH-1, Mil Mi-2, Mil Mi-8, Aérospatiale SA 330
- Transport: Boeing 727, Boeing 737, Douglas DC-8, Antonov An-12, Antonov An-26, Antonov An-72, Ilyushin Il-76

The Congolese Air Force (French: Force Aérienne Congolaise, or FAC) is the air force branch of the Armed Forces of the Democratic Republic of the Congo (Congo-Kinshasa). From 1971 to 1997, it was known as the Zairian Air Force (Force Aérienne Zaïroise, or FAZA). FAC currently possesses numerous aircraft including Sukhoi Su-25, MiG-23, and Mil Mi-24.

== History ==
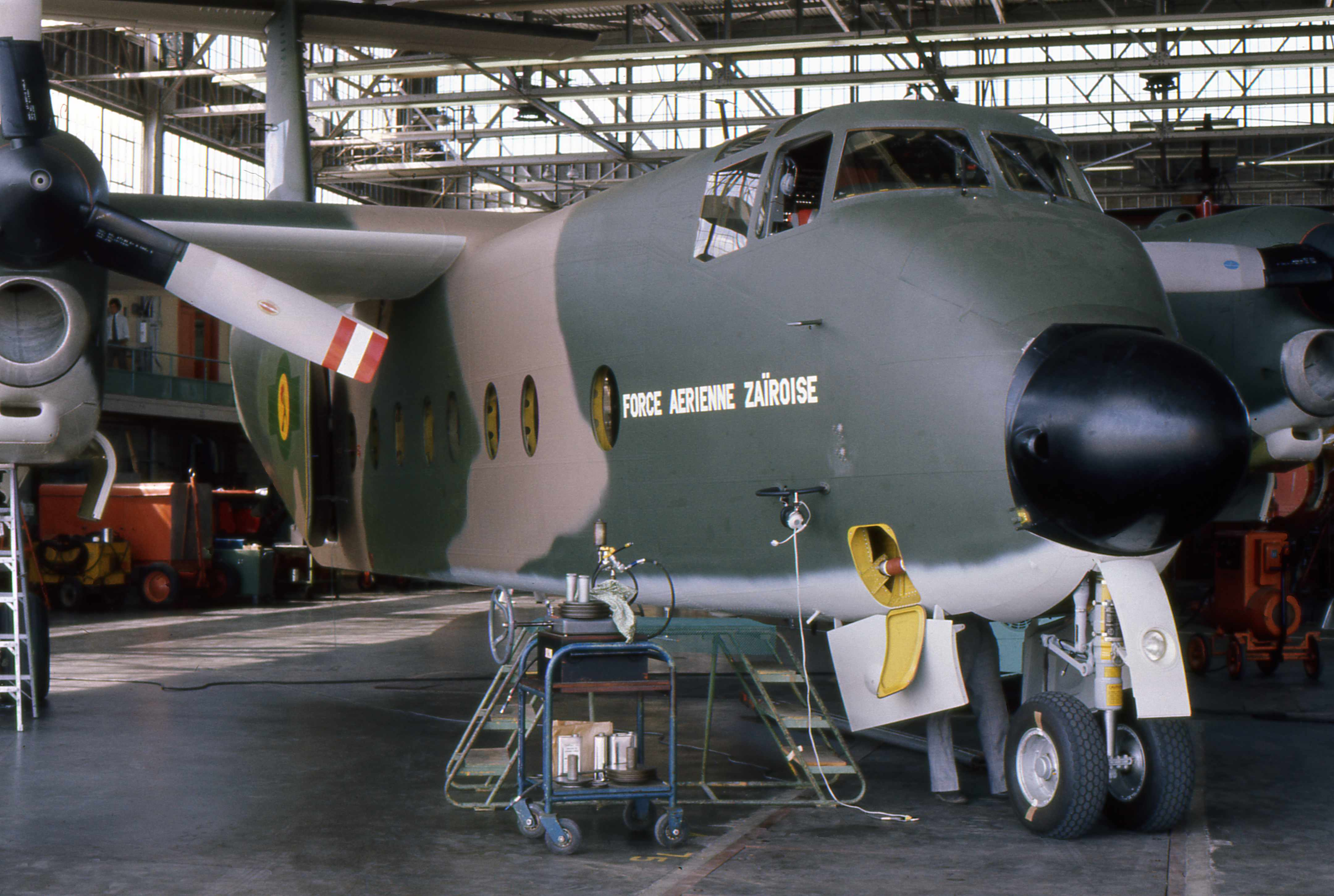
A de Havilland Canada DHC-5 Buffalo in the markings of the Force Aérienne Zaïroise in 1975

Shortly after the Congo became independent in 1960, the province of Katanga seceded, and the newly formed State of Katanga began building its own army. The Katangese seized most of the aircraft operated by the Aviation de la Force Publique and created the Katangese Air Force. The Congolese Air Force was created in mid-1961 largely to oppose the new Katangese Air Force. In 1963, Katanga was defeated by United Nations forces in Operation Grandslam, and the remaining assets of the Katangese Armed Forces were integrated into the Congolese Air Force.

A Central Intelligence Agency (CIA) front company, Anstalt WIGMO, provided maintenance support to large parts of the FAC in the 1964–1968 period. The CIA also provided aircraft during the same period and pilots from late 1962 onwards.

In July 1970 the Institute for Strategic Studies described the Force Aérienne Zaïroise (FAZ) as numbering 650 with 21 combat aircraft. Aircraft strength was listed as ten T-6 Texan and eight T-28 Trojan armed trainers, two DC-4 and ten DC-3 transports, and six Alouette helicopters. The ISS said that 17 MB-326GB ground attack/trainer aircraft were on order, of which about five had been received.

In July 1974 the International Institute for Strategic Studies described the FAZ as numbering 800 personnel with 33 aircraft. The Military Balance for 1974–75 listed one fighter wing with 17 MB-326GB, 6 AT-6G and 10 T-28 armed trainers, one transport wing with 9 C-47, 4 C-54, and 3 C-130, one training wing with 8 T-6 and 12 SF-260MC, and one helicopter squadron with 20 Alouette II/III and 7 Aérospatiale SA 330 Pumas. It noted that 17 Mirage V and 3 C-130H were on order.

FAZ Roundel

The Air Combat Information Group states that by the mid-1980s the FAZ suffered from the same problems as the rest of the Zairian Armed Forces, including lack of funding and widespread corruption. According to FAZ helicopter pilot Pierre Yambuya's tell-all memoir, he regularly had to perform so-called "special missions", consisting of moving prisoners to places where they were tortured or assassinated. On other occasions, he had to drop packages of up to 600 kg. filled with corpses and debris in a river.

In the 1980s the air force was theoretically organised into the 1er Groupement Aérien, at Kinshasa (N'djili Airport?), with the 19th Logistics Support Wing (C-130s and Dakotas), the 12th Liaison Wing (helicopters, MU-2Js, and Cessna 310Rs) and the 13th Training Wing. The 2e Groupement Aérien Tactique at Kamina Air Base comprised the 21st Fighter-Attack Wing with Mirage 5s and MB.326Ks, and the 22nd Tactical Transport Wing, with 221 Squadron operating the two of three originally delivered DHC-5 Buffalos.

The extreme corruption of the force meant that Zairian aircraft were more often used for private 'business' of their fliers and their superiors than operations against rebels. From an originally delivered eight Dassault Mirage 5Ms, only seven were left by 1988, with five being lost in different accidents. By the mid-1990s the last three were sold. Michela Wrong's In the Footsteps of Mr. Kurtz: Living on the Brink of Disaster in the Congo reports a story that the remaining Mirages were sold in France whilst there for maintenance, in order to finance a Zairian Air Force commander's retirement.

The FAZ played little part in the First Congo War, with most aircraft inoperable. Some aircraft were imported and used by Serbian mercenaries, but had little operational effect. The FAC has reportedly hired Georgian ex-military pilots to train FARDC pilots in counterinsurgency operations, who may also have participated in combat operations.

Two FAC Mi-24 helicopters were shot down in Rutshuru, North Kivu, by M23 rebels around January 27, 2017. In 2022, the Air Force supported efforts by the FARDC to counter an offensive by M23 militants in eastern Congo. In January 2023, there were media reports of an FAC Su-25 being shot at over North-Eastern Congo, near the Rwanda border.

== Current structure ==
As of 2007, all military aircraft in the Democratic Republic of the Congo were operated by the Air Force. Jane's World Air Forces states that the Air Force has an estimated strength of 1,800 personnel and is organised into two Air Groups. These Groups command five wings and nine squadrons, of which not all are operational. 1 Air Group is located at Kinshasa and consists of Liaison Wing, Training Wing and Logistical Wing and has a strength of five squadrons. 2 Tactical Air Group is located at Kamina and consists of Pursuit and Attack Wing and Tactical Transport Wing and has a strength of four squadrons. Foreign private military companies have reportedly been contracted to provide the DRC's aerial reconnaissance capability using small propeller aircraft fitted with sophisticated equipment. Jane's states that People's Air and Air Defence Force of Angola fighter aircraft would be made available to defend Kinshasa if it came under attack.

Like the other services, the Congolese Air Force is not capable of carrying out its responsibilities. Few of the Air Force's aircraft are currently flyable or capable of being restored to service and it is unclear whether the Air Force is capable of maintaining even unsophisticated aircraft. Moreover, Jane's states that the Air Force's Ecole de Pilotage is 'in near total disarray' though Belgium has offered to restart the Air Force's pilot training program.

=== Known chiefs of staff ===
- Major General Faustin Munene in 1997
- Brigadier General Jean Bitanihirwa Kamara in 2005
- Major General Djedje Ndamba in 2006
- Major General John Numbi in 2007
- Major General Rigobert Massamba Musungu from 2007
- Brigadier General (Major General from July 2018) Numbi Ngoie Enoch since 2014

== Aircraft ==
According to Flight International 2004 and IISS Military Balance 2007 past aircraft have included the MiG-23 Flogger, the Lockheed C-130 Hercules, the de Havilland Canada DHC-5 Buffalo, the North American T-28 Trojan, and the Eurocopter AS332 Super Puma. Jane's World Air Forces 2007 states that the Air Force operates between 9 and 22 Mil Mi-24/35s attack helicopters, and a single Mi-26. The condition of the DRC's aircraft which are not currently in service is generally so poor that they cannot be repaired and returned to flyable status. The DRC's single Mil Mi-26 'Halo' was shown as a photo in Air Forces Monthly (AFM)'s July 2007 issue without obvious rust and appearing to be in good condition which was taken on April 12, 2007, at Lubumbashi. It was delivered in 2005. AFM says that a second Mi-26 prepared for the DRC has been stored with Skytech at Liège Airport, Belgium since at least June 2002. As of 2015 the table below displays aircraft presently in flyable condition.

A report on the Facebook page of Scramble magazine in December 2018 shows a Hawker Siddeley Andover, Douglas DC-8-55F and Boeing 737 aircraft in use by the DRC-AF at Kinshasa.

=== Current inventory ===
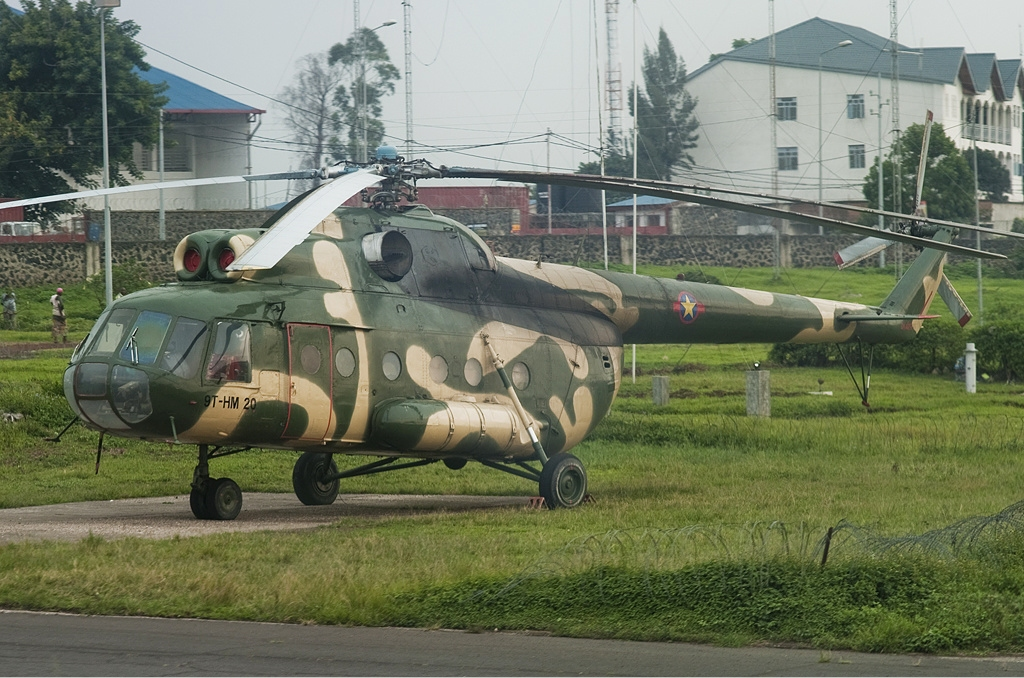
Democratic Republic of Congo Air Force Mil Mi-8, February 2011

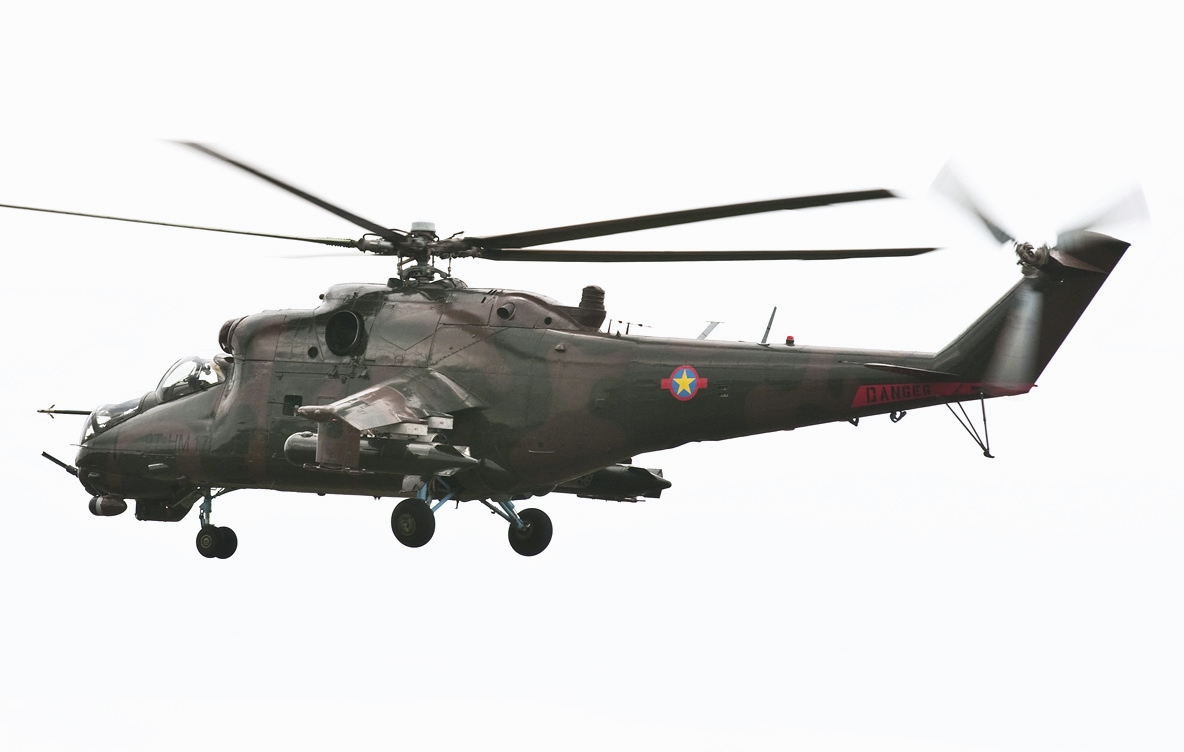
A Congolese Mil Mi-24 attack helicopter, in flight in 2012

Aircraft	Origin	Type	Variant	In service	Notes
Combat aircraft
Sukhoi Su-25	Russia	Attack		5	1 destroyed in a crash incident on 17 June 2026
Reconnaissance
AHRLAC Mwari	South Africa	Reconnaissance			6 on order
Transport
Boeing 727	United States	VIP transport		1	
Boeing 737	United States	Transport		2	
Antonov An-26	Soviet Union	Transport		3	
Antonov An-74	Soviet Union	Transport		1	
CN-235	Spain/Indonesia	Transport		1	1 on order
Embraer 135	Brazil	Transport		1	
Embraer 145	Brazil	Transport		1	
Ilyushin Il-76	Soviet Union			3	
N-219	Indonesia	Utility aircraft			5 on order
Helicopters
Aérospatiale SA 330	France	Utility/transport		10	
Aérospatiale Gazelle	France	Utility	SA342	3	
Alouette III	France	Liaison		2	
Bell UH-1	United States	Utility	UH-1H	3	
Bell 206	United States	Utility		2	
Mil Mi-2	Poland	Utility		2	
Mil Mi-8	Soviet Union	Utility	Mi-8/17	6	
Mil Mi-24	Soviet Union	Attack	Mi-35	9	
Mil Mi-26	Soviet Union	Heavy lift		1	
IAR 330	Romania	Utility		1	
Trainer aircraft
L-39	Czech Republic	Jet Trainer		2	
