= Congo River, Beyond Darkness =

- French: Congo river, au-delà des ténèbres
- Directed by: Thierry Michel
- Written by: Thierry Michel
- Music by: Lokua Kanza
- Release date: September 2005 (Namur Film Festival)
- Country: Belgium
- Languages: French; English

Congo River, Beyond Darkness (French: Congo river, au-delà des ténèbres) is a 2005 film by Thierry Michel examining the Congo River in Africa. The film premiered at the 2005 Festival International du Film Francophone de Namur.

== Synopsis ==
The film takes us from the mouth to the source of the second largest river basin in the world, that of the Congo River (the largest is the Amazon). All along its 4371 km, we discover places that have seen the turbulent history of this country, while archives remind us of the mythological figures that created its destiny: explorers such as Livingstone and Stanley, the colonial kings Leopold II and Baudouin and leaders such as Lumumba, Mobutu and Kabila.
