= Crime in the Democratic Republic of the Congo =

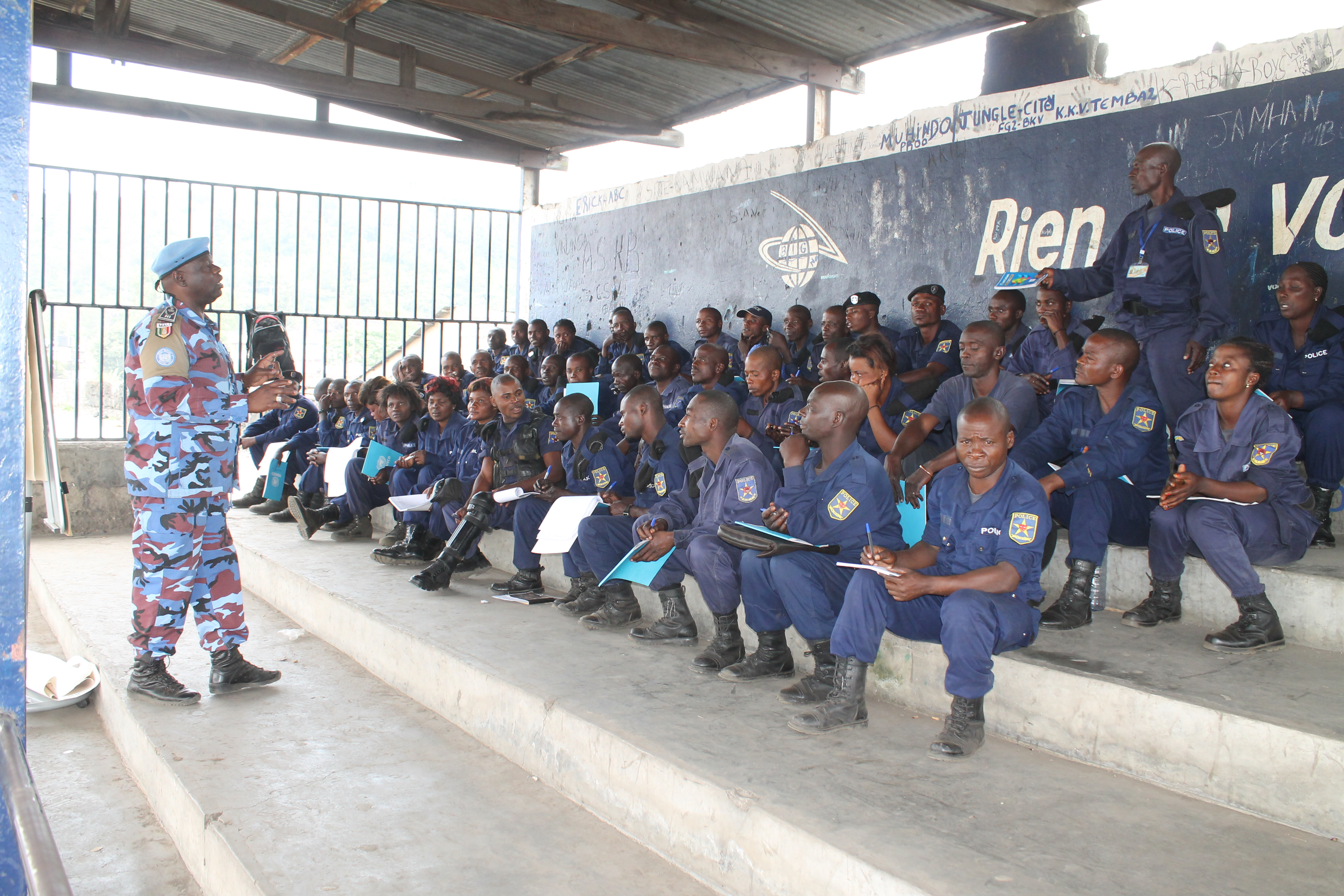
Democratic Republic of the Congo police officers in Goma.

Crime in the Democratic Republic of the Congo is investigated by the DRC's police.

== Crime by type ==
=== Murder ===
The Democratic Republic of the Congo had a murder rate of 12.4 per 100,000 population in 2021.

=== Corruption ===
Corruption in the Democratic Republic of the Congo is widespread at all levels of government, ranging from petty bribery involving local bureaucrats to grand-scale embezzlement of public funds by political elites. Transparency International's Corruption Perceptions Index, which measures how effectively countries are perceived to control public-sector corruption, consistently ranks the DRC near the bottom. The BBC's DRC country profile calls its recent history "one of civil war and corruption." A 2024 report by Transparency International described the DRC as the eighth most corrupt country in Africa. President Joseph Kabila established the Commission of Repression of Economic Crimes upon his ascension to power in 2001.

=== Sexual violence ===
The DRC, and the east of the DRC in particular, has been described as the "rape capital of the world". The prevalence and intensity of all forms of sexual violence has been described as the worst in the world.

Much of the research conducted about sexual violence in the DRC has focused on violence against and rape of women as related to these armed conflict, mostly occurring in the eastern region of the country. The eastern region of the DRC has the highest rates of sexual violence, and much of it is perpetrated by armed militia groups. However, other studies have begun to show that sexual violence is pervasive in all parts of the DRC and that it is not always related to the conflict.

=== Human trafficking ===
The Democratic Republic of the Congo (DRC) is a source and destination country for men, women, and children subjected to trafficking in persons, specifically conditions of forced labor and forced prostitution. The majority of this trafficking is internal, and much of it is perpetrated by armed groups and government forces outside government control within the DRC's unstable eastern provinces.
