= Rigobert Massamba Musungu =

- Allegiance: Democratic Republic of the Congo
- Branch: DR Congo Air Force
- Service years: 1965—2018
- Rank: Major general
- Commands: Kitona Air Base

Rigobert Massamba Musungu is a major general in the Air Force of the Democratic Republic of the Congo. Massamba commanded the Kitona Air Base until June 2007, when he was appointed as the chief of air force staff of the Democratic Republic of the Congo. He was replaced at some point as the air force chief by Brigadier General Numbi Ngoie Enoch (former deputy chief for operations), and by 2015 Massamba was the Inspector General of the Armed Forces. In July 2018, he retired and John Numbi replaced him as FARDC Inspector General.
