= The Voice of the Voiceless =

- Directed by: Maximon Monihan
- Release date: 2013

The Voice of the Voiceless (La voz de los silenciados) is a 2013 silent film by director Maximon Monihan. Set in New York City, it follows the life of Olga, a deaf young woman, in her attempt to escape the cartel that had enslaved her and other people with hearing deficiencies.

== Plot ==
Olga, along with others from Mexico and Guatemala, are brought to New York under the false promise that they are being offered a scholarship at a sign language school. Upon arrival, they discover they are being held hostage and forced to sell paper towels on the New York City Subway for the well-being of the cartel leader. If they fail to meet their daily requirements they are subject to torture.

Olga soon discovers that she can meet her daily quota faster by dancing in front of the subway passengers, thus ensuring she has time and money left in the day for other activities. In the end, she decides to attempt an escape by murdering the cartel with rat poison. Her faith is nonetheless stronger and goes back from her decision.

The film participated in the Transilvania International Film Festival in 2014.

Director Maximon Monihan was born in 1969 in Washington state and now lives in Brooklyn. He has a degree in Philosophy and Cultural Studies from the University of California, Santa Cruz. In 2005 he founded his production company named Bricolagista. The Voice of the Voiceless is his first feature film.
