= Voice of the Voiceless (album) =

Studio album by Borderlands
- Released: June 10, 2016
- Genre: Progressive metalcore; metalcore; deathcore; melodic metalcore; djent
- Length: 28:59

Borderlands chronology
Awaken Dreams (2012)	Voice of the Voiceless (2016)

Voice of the Voiceless is the debut studio album by Portuguese progressive metalcore supergroup Borderlands, released on June 10, 2016.

== Music ==
On Voice of the Voiceless Borderlands incorporate elements of progressive metalcore, metalcore, deathcore, melodic metalcore and djent

== Track listing ==
No.	Title	Length
1.	"Continuum"	2:15
2.	"Children of the Storm" (ft. Nelson Rebelo of The Voynich Code)	2:54
3.	"Release Yourself"	3:28
4.	"Lineage"	2:29
5.	"Limitless"	3:17
6.	"Essencia"	3:45
7.	"Voice of the Voiceless"	2:41
8.	"The Curse" (ft. Anger of Above The Hate)	3:31
9.	"Children of the Sun"	4:39
Total length:		28:59

== Personnel ==
=== Band ===
- Rui Martins - Lead vocals
- Yuri José - Guitar
- Hugo Capelo - Guitar
- Gonçalo Beco - Bass
- Cristóvão "Kiki" Monteiro - Drums

=== Production ===
- Nicolas Delestrade - Mixing, Mastering
