= Michel Thierry (industrialist) =

French industrialist (1928–2021)

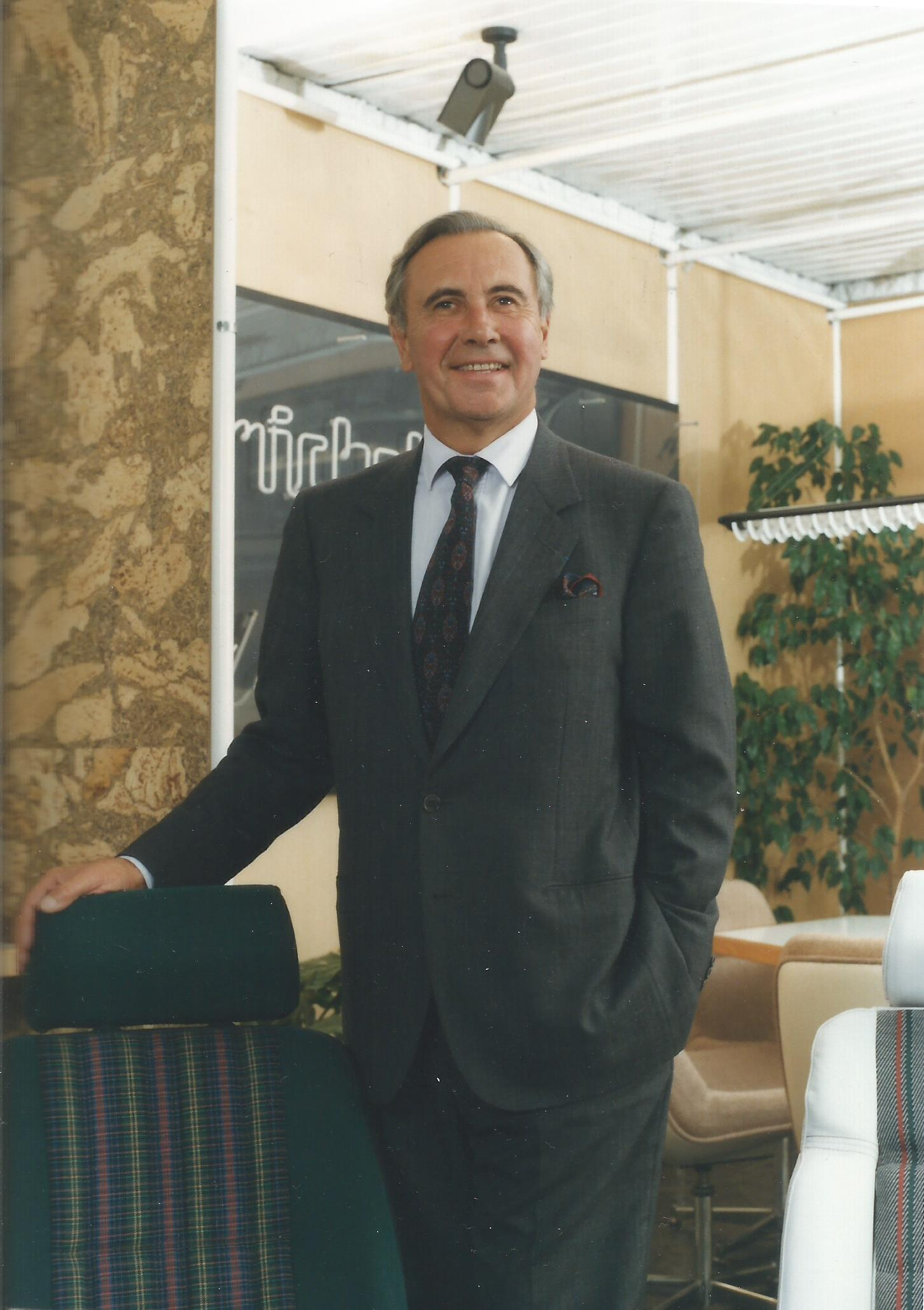
- Thierry in 1990
- Born: July 24, 1928; Foulayronnes, France
- Died: 7 December 2021 (aged 93); Dax, France
- Occupation: Industrialist

Michel Thierry (24 July 1928 – 7 December 2021) was a French industrialist in the textile sector.

== Early life ==
Originally from Lot-et-Garonne, Thierry moved to the Pays d'Olmes, where he founded a textile company in 1955.

== Career ==
Initially specializing in fabrics for clothing and upholstery, the Société Michel Thierry began producing textiles for automotive equipment, becoming one of the European leaders in the sector and the largest employer in Ariège. The company was sold off in the 2000s, although the original textile plant is still in operation, owned by Asahi Kasei as of 2021.

During his time as a business owner, Thierry helped finance the Monts d'Olmes resort and presided over the Stade lavelanétien rugby team. He also supported the foundation of the Musée du textile et du peigne en corne de Lavelanet. He was the father of Laurent Thierry, head of the company Actis.

== Death ==
Thierry died in Dax on 7 December 2021, at the age of 93.
