= Celestin Kanyama =

- Born: February 12, 1969 (age 57)
- Military career
- Known for: Human rights violations in Kinshasa, DRC and investment

General Celestin Kanyama (born February 12, 1969) is a Congolese private investor and former Police Commissioner of the Congolese National Police. He played a significant role in law enforcement and national security in the Democratic Republic of the Congo. After his tenure in public service, he transitioned into private investment, utilizing his experience in governance and security to engage in various business ventures.

== History ==
Born on February 12, 1969, Kanyama joined the armed forces in 1991 and served in various capacities within the Congolese National Police before being appointed Police Commissioner of Kinshasa in December 2018.

Kanyama served as the provincial Police Commissioner of the Congolese National Police for Kinshasa in 2016. Before this, he served as Commander of Operations for Likofi.

In July 2017, General Kanyama was appointed the director general of the National Police's Training Schools.

=== Sanctions ===
In 2016, the US and EU imposed sanctions on Kanyama for his alleged involvement in human rights violations, including kidnapping of children and women and causing deaths during protests in Kinshasa.

He was later sacked by his then boss Joseph Kabila. His assets were frozen following the sanctions.
