= Floribert Chebeya =

Congolese human rights activist (1963–2010)

Picture of Bahizire

Floribert Chebeya Bahizire (13 September 1963 – 2 June 2010) was Congolese human rights activist and politician. Hailed by the United Nations as "a champion of human rights," his death in 2010 led to calls for an investigation from more than 50 organisations, including Amnesty International and Human Rights Watch, as well as many countries and several senior UN officials, including Ban Ki-moon, Navi Pillay, Alan Doss and Philip Alston.

== Career ==
Bahizire was born in Bukavu. He worked from the early 1990s until his sudden suspicious death in 2010, the cause of which has yet to be established. He was the leader of the Voix des Sans Voix (Voice of the Voiceless) human rights organisation. His work led to him being issued with repetitive threats from the police. Throughout his life Chebeya denounced several governments and rulers, including the dictator Mobutu Sese Seko, his successor President Laurent-Désiré Kabila and the incumbent government at the time of his death. At the time of his death Chebeya had campaigned against King Albert II of Belgium taking part in the celebrations of DRC's 50th anniversary, had organized a protest about the removal of Vital Kamerhee, had finalized a complaint against those responsible for the Bas-Congo Bundu dia Kongo massacre to be filed with the International Penal Court, was criticizing the government delays in setting up the Independent National Electoral Commission (CENI) and was investigating the death of Aimée Kabila, who claimed to be the president's sister.

== Death ==
Chebeya had been asked to meet with Congo's Inspector General of Police, the national police chief, General John Numbi, on 1 June 2010. It is unknown if this meeting occurred. Chebeya texted his wife to inform her he had arrived at police HQ at Kinshasa for the meeting but that was the last contact he had with the outside world. He was later found dead by passers-by in the backseat of his car in a suburb of Kinshasa, with some clothing removed. Chebeya's driver, Fidèle Bazana, had disappeared and is presumed to have been killed. Female hair and condoms were discovered alongside him in the car. His trousers were unzipped. No blood or bullet holes were found. However, Chebeya had blood in several orifices.

== Reactions to death ==
=== Congolese response ===
Congolese Interior Minister Adolphe Lumanu ordered authorities to investigate this incident and condolenced with Chebeya's family.

Chief of police in Kinshasa, General Jean De Dieu Oleko, said police would investigate the circumstances.

Voice of the Voiceless's Dolly Ibefo asked for an independent autopsy.

On 6 June, the Congolese head of police was suspended and three police officers were arrested. Interior Minister Adolphe Lumanu said in a statement read out on television that President Joseph Kabila was "determined that all light be shed" and "To allow the enquiry to be conducted smoothly, the national defence council decided as a precaution to suspend inspector general John Numbi".

=== International response ===
Amnesty International's deputy Africa director, Veronique Aubert, issued a statement upon hearing of his death: "We are stunned and appalled by the suspicious death of such a prominent and respected human rights defender". Amnesty would like his death to be investigated.

- Several representatives of the UN responded.
  - The United Nations High Commissioner for Human Rights, Navi Pillay, paid tribute: "For more than 20 years, Chebeya Bahizire had survived many death threats, arrests, and ill-treatment due to his work as a human rights defender. He believed in the cause of human rights and was not afraid to pursue it against all odds".
  - UN investigator for extrajudicial executions Philip Alston suggested "official responsibility" during a speech he delivered to the United Nations Human Rights Council in Geneva.
  - UN mission head in Congo Alan Doss is reported to have said: "The Special Representative calls for the authorities to initiate a prompt investigation so that full light can be shed on this death".
  - UN Secretary-General, Ban Ki-moon soon requested an independent investigation into Chebeya's death and promised to help in any way he could.
- The European Union called for an independent investigation into Chebeya's death.
  - Congolese authorities said they would permit Dutch experts to assist with the autopsy on Chebeya's body.
  - The UK's African minister Henry Bellingham asked for "a full and transparent investigation". Kikaya Bin Karubi, the Congolese ambassador to the UK, told the BBC on 9 June that a group called Les Resistants Combattants had claimed responsibility for an arson attack on his London home, which destroyed several vehicles and damaged his house, and that it was an act of retaliation for Chebeya's death.
- Organisations in the Republic of the Congo called for an independent investigation into Chebeya's death.
- The United States called for an independent investigation into Chebeya's death.
- The Belgian director Thierry Michel made the documentary L'affaire Chebeya covering the trial and events leading up to it, winning the Grand Prize at the International Film Festival of Human Rights in Paris in March 2012.

== Autopsy ==
An independent autopsy returned an "inconclusive" result.

== Convictions ==
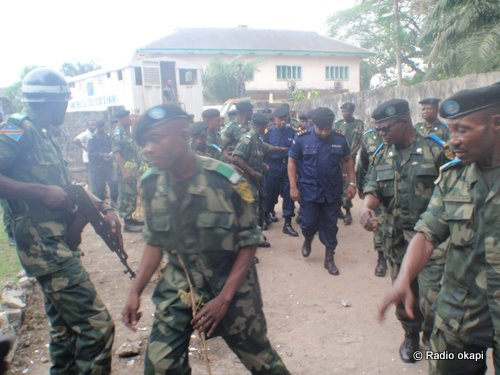
Arrival of the convicted police officers during the opening of their trial at the military court of Kinshasa, 12 November 2010.

In June 2011, four policemen were sentenced to death and another was sentenced to life imprisonment after being convicted by a military court of planning and carrying out Chebeya's assassination. Three of the former were absent from court during sentencing - these were believed to have carried out the actual assassination. Three other policemen were acquitted of any part in Chebeya's assassination. Many hours were spent reading out the verdict, with hundreds of people turning up to hear it.

Paul Mwilambwe, who was in charge of security for the premises where Chebeya was killed in June 2010, said he saw the activist's assassination on a surveillance camera. He accused President Joseph Kabila of personally ordering the assassination. He also accused former head of police General John Numbi. In January 2022 the Kinshasa-Gombe High military court declined to hear testimony from former President Kabila.

On September 22, 2021, the appeal trial of two members of the squad that killed the human rights defender and his driver began. In October 2021 former Lieutenant Jacques Mugabo confessed to participating in the murder by suffocation of both Chebeya and Bazana. In May 2022, charges of murder, desertion and misappropriation of weapons and ammunition were proved against Commissioner of police Christian Ngoy Kenga Kenga who was sentenced to death. Mugabo was given 12 years’ imprisonment. Mwilambwe (who gave evidence) was acquitted. As at May 2022, General Numbi, having been charged with murder, had fled to unknown whereabouts. In October 2023 he publicly issued a video threatening President Felix Tshisekedi.

== See also ==
- Human rights in the Democratic Republic of the Congo
- Reebok Human Rights Award
