= Thierry Michel =

Belgian film director

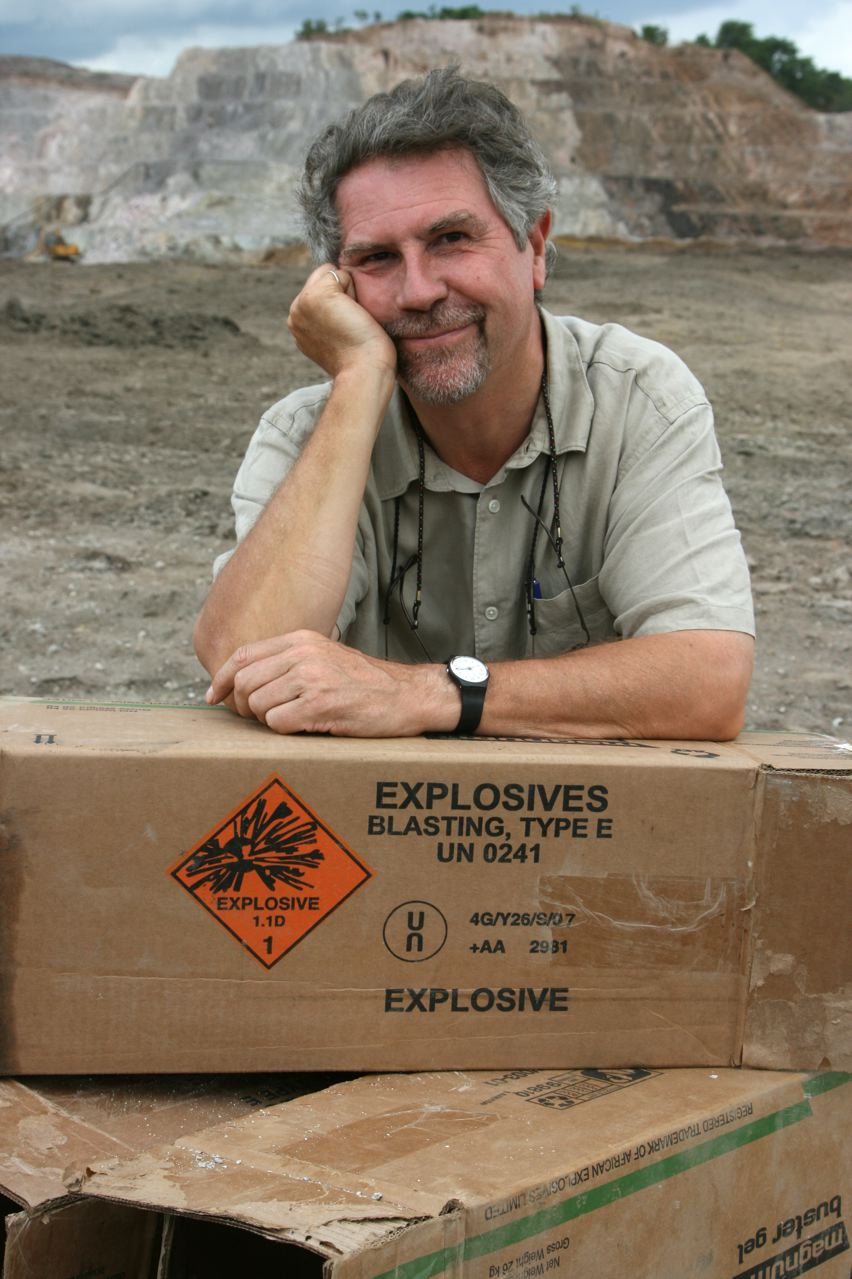
- Born: 13 October 1952 (age 73); Charleroi, Belgium
- Occupation: Film director
- Known for: Congo River, Beyond Darkness

Thierry Michel (born 13 October 1952) is a Belgian film director, mostly making social and political documentaries. His office and company Les films de la passerelle is located in Liège, where he works with the producer Christine Pireaux. Over a twenty-year period he has made a series of documentaries on different aspects of Zaire (now the Democratic Republic of the Congo). Taken together his films provide a unique overview of the social, economic and political life of the country.

== Belgium ==
Thierry Michel was born in Charleroi in Belgium on 13 October 1952 in an industrial region called "The Black Country". At the age of 16 he began cinema studies at the Institute of broadcast arts in Brussels. While there he experienced the last student upheavals of 1968. He became one of the leaders of an emerging Walloon cinema movement. His 1982 Chronique d'une saison d'acier (Chronicle of a steel season) is set in the mining and steel region of his childhood. This "factional" film, combining fiction and fact, analyzes the rapid decline of the Walloon steel industry that began in 1974 and the way in which this affected the region. His first feature film Hiver 60 (Winter 60) which tells of the 1960–1961 Winter General Strike in Belgium was made in 1982. The film was entered into the 13th Moscow International Film Festival. He was among the signatories of the Manifesto for Walloon culture in 1983. He again combined fiction and fact with his 1985 Hôtel Particulier (Mansion) about the prison system.

In 1993 Thierry Michel made a film about a scandal that had deeply shaken Belgium: La Grâce Perdue d'Alain Van Der Biest (The fall from grace of fr). This tells a story of a senior politician who became involved in corruption and organized crime, his drinking problem and eventual suicide. Michel's Métamorphose d'une gare (2010) documents the construction of the new station of Guillemins in Liège over a nine-year period. It does not hide the problems and frictions in this huge project, but also draws out the enthusiasm and pride of the builders.

== Zaire and other countries ==
Thierry Michel became interested in ethnographic work in developing countries, particularly Africa. He directed his second feature film Issue de Secours (Emergency Exit) in 1987, a poetic and mystical work set in the Moroccan desert. This film was co-produced by RTBF, the Belgian radio and TV broadcaster. He depicted the street urchins and slums of Brazil in the documentaries Gosses de Rio (Kids from Rio) and À Fleur de Terre (Grass roots), both released in 1990. His award-winning Zaïre, le cycle du serpent (Zaire, the Cycle of the Serpent) portrays the famous and the outcasts of Zairian society. It was released in 1992. He investigated charity operations in the dangerous conditions of Somalia with his 1994 Somalie, l'Humanitaire s'en va-t-en guerre (Somalia, the Humanitarian Goes to War).

Thierry Michel returned to Zaire in 1995 to make a film about the legacy of colonialism and the white presence in the country 35 years after independence. He was arrested, jailed and deported a few days after arriving and his equipment was seized. However, he managed to complete Les Derniers Colons (The last colonials) using images from the preliminary shooting. The same year he made a documentary on white settlers in Zaire following independence named Nostalgie post-coloniale (Post-colonial nostalgia). He returned to Africa in 1996 to make Donka, radioscopie d'un hôpital africain (Donka, fluoroscopy of an African hospital), which depicts the bleak conditions in Donka Hospital in Conakry, Guinea.

In 1998 after the fall of Mobutu Sese Seko Thierry Michel made the historical journalism film Mobutu roi du Zaïre (Mobutu, King of Zaire), a Franco-Belgian co-production. Michel watched over 950 hours of archived films to make the documentary, selecting extracts and interleaving them with interviews of many witnesses, both opponents and supporters of Mobutu. In 2003 he released Iran, sous le voile des apparences (Iran, under the veil of appearances), contrasting the religious fervor of some with the desire for freedom of others. In the film Michel defends president Mohammad Khatami, using extracts from the president's propaganda without commentary to present his struggle for the liberty of the people.

Thierry Michel returned once more to the Democratic Republic of the Congo in 2004, making a film that explores the majestic Congo River (2005) and the life it creates in Congo River, Beyond Darkness. His first assistant in making this movie was the local director Guy Kabeya Muya. Thierry Michel made the TV documentary Katanga, la guerre du cuivre (Katanga, the copper war) in 2009, the basis for the film Katanga Business. The film surveys the industrial and artisanal mining industry in Katanga Province. It explores the murky dealings between the state-owned Gécamines, other mining companies and individuals like George Forrest, Chinese companies and state officials in the copper industry, and questions who benefits from the mining operations. A book was published with the same title with photographs by Thierry Michel. Floribert Chebeya, a human rights activist in the Congo, was assassinated on 2 June 2010. Thierry Michel made the documentary L'affaire Chebeya covering the trial and events leading up to it.

== Reception ==
Thierry Michel has drawn criticism for lack of analysis in his documentaries. Katanga Business lets the images and people in the film tell the story, as in a drama, rather than providing explanations of causes and effects. His Iran, sous le voile des apparences was said to take the propaganda of president Mohammad Khatami at face value. A reviewer described Mobutu roi du Zaïre as more cinematographic than televisual, with a tension between the factual investigation and the artistic creation. Writing on Métamorphose d'une gare, a reviewer said Thierry Michel's film was nothing but a tissue of anecdotes. Another says that, fascinated by the technical challenges, Thierry Michel sees the men involved with a less clear eye. Le Monde said of L'affaire Chebeya that because the analysis is subtle, the documentary is probably only accessible to those who already known something of the Congo.

However, Thierry Michel's work has been widely recognized. Les Derniers Colons received critical acclaim. The three-part documentary Mobutu roi du Zaïre was a nominee for Best Documentary at the 1999 International Documentary Association, received a special mention at the 1999 European Film Awards and won the European Film Academy's Prix Arte. Iran, sous le voile des apparences was shown at the major festivals and won several international awards. Congo River won a number of awards at different festivals. L'affaire Chebeya won the Grand Prize at the International Film Festival of Human Rights in Paris in March 2012. Katanga Business was nominated for a Magritte Award in the category of Best Documentary in 2011. The Man Who Mends Women: The Wrath of Hippocrate (2015) is a documentary about Doctor Denis Mukwege, Winner of the Nobel Peace Prize 2018, known as the man who mends thousands of women who have been raped during the 20 years of conflicts in the East of the Democratic Republic of the Congo.

== Filmography ==
Films directed by Thierry Michel include:

- 1970 : Mines (court métrage)
- 1971 : Ferme du Fir (court métrage)
- 1973 : Portrait d'un auto-portrait
- 1975 : Pays Noir, Pays Rouge
- 1982 : Chronique des saisons d'acier
- 1982 : Hiver 60
- 1985 : Hôtel particulier
- 1987 : Issue de secours
- 1990 : Gosses de Rio
- 1990 : À fleur de terre
- 1992 : Zaïre, le cycle du serpent
- 1993 : La Grâce perdue d'Alain Van der Biest
- 1994 : Somalie, l'humanitaire s'en va-t'en-guerre
- 1995 : Les Derniers Colons
- 1995 : Nostalgies post coloniales
- 1996 : Donka, radioscopie d'un hôpital africain
- 1999 : Mobutu roi du Zaïre
- 2003 : Iran, sous le voile des apparences
- 2005 : Congo River, Beyond Darkness
- 2009 : Katanga Business
- 2010 : Métamorphose d'une gare
- 2012 : L'affaire Chebeya
- 2013 : The Irresistible Rise of Moïse Katumbi
- 2015 : The Man Who Mends Women: The Wrath of Hippocrates
- 2017 : Children of Chance
- 2021 : L'école de la dernière chance
- 2022 : Empire of Silence

== Bibliography ==
- Mudaba Yoka, Lyé; Michel, Thierry; Ndaywel è nziem, Isidore (2006). Congo River. Renaissance du livre. ISBN 2874156124.
- Michel, Thierry; M'Bokolo, Elikia (2009). Katanga business: un livre. Luc Pire. ISBN 978-2507002756.
