= Law enforcement in the Democratic Republic of the Congo =

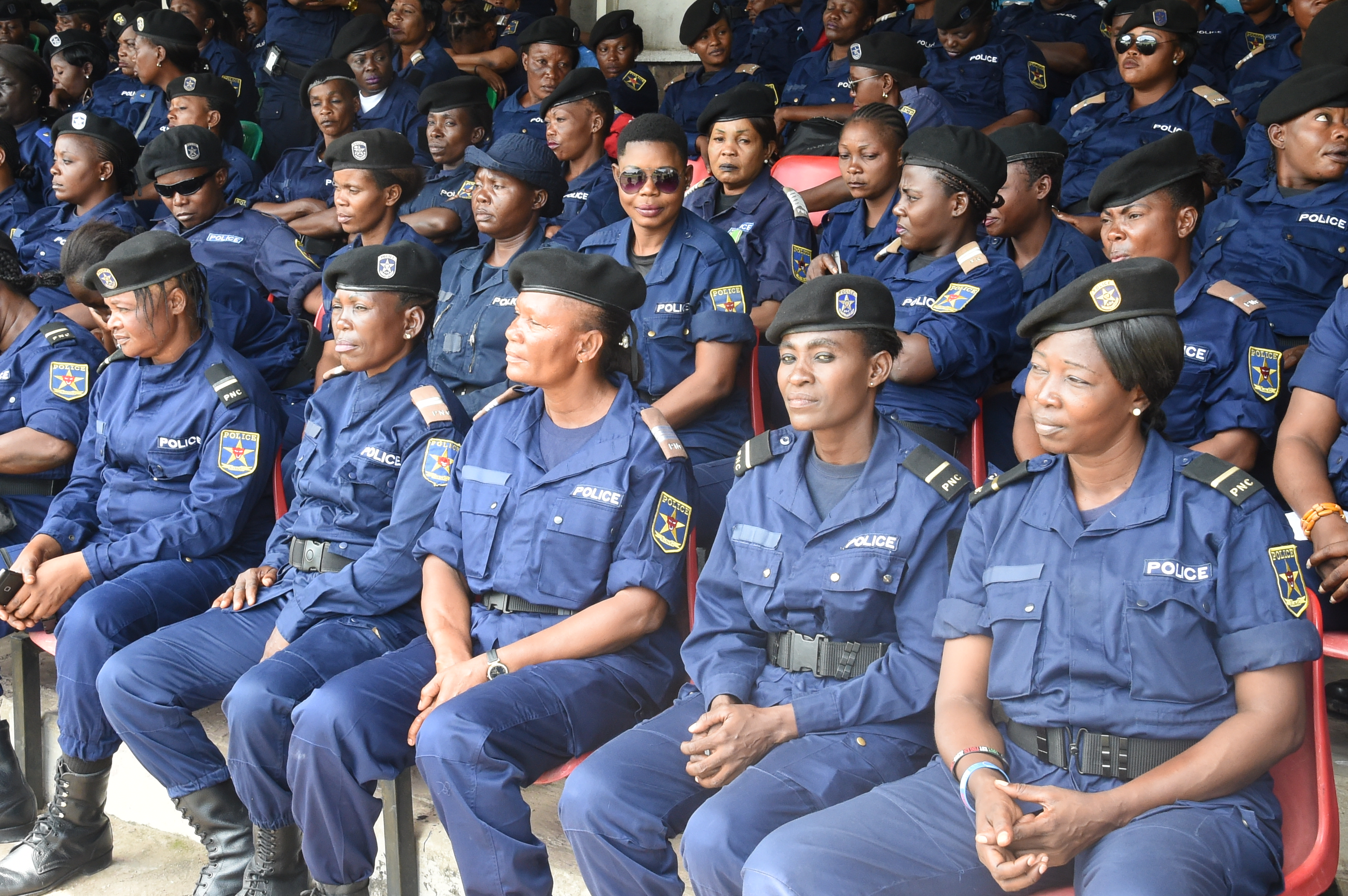
Democratic Republic of the Congo police officers in Kinshasa.

Law enforcement in the Democratic Republic of the Congo has historically been focused on furthering the state's aims with no regard for human rights. The Police nationale congolaise (Congolese National Police) is the police throughout the territory of the Democratic Republic of the Congo. It was composed of between 110,000 and 150,000 officers as of 2010.

== History ==
After the King of the Belgians, Leopold II, set up the Congo Free State (CFS) in 1885, the Force Publique (established in 1886) acted both as the state's military force and as a policing organisation for the country. Members of the Force Publique were redeployed into garrison and territorial troops after World War I, with the territorial troops primarily responsible for internal security. In 1959, the territorial troops effectively became the gendarmerie, and by independence in 1960 there were three police forces: the gendarmerie, the local police, and the Chief's Police (collectivity police).

In 1972 – Decrees 72-031 dated 31 July and 72-041 dated 30 August – President Mobutu merged the primarily urban Zairian (formerly Congolese) National Police and the gendarmes (largely rural) into a unified organisation, the Gendarmerie Nationale (GDN). The gendarmerie were thus enlarged substantially and became a component of the Forces Armées Zaïroises (FAZ), alongside the Land Forces, Navy, and Air Force. Only the collectivity police remained outside the FAZ.

In 1984 – Decree 84-036 dated 28 August – a new force called the Garde Civile (Civil Guard), was created and confined to protocol/honorary duties. This unit became very quickly a strong political police dedicated to the safeguard of Mobutu's regime.

On 22 April 1997, with the advent of the Alliance des Forces Démocratiques de Libération (AFDL), its president, Laurent Désiré Kabila restored the Congolese National Police by merging personnel from both the Gendarmerie and the Garde Civile. AFDL military personnel also joined the force.

For a long time, the former decrees creating the Gendarmerie and the Garde Civile remained in use, particularly in areas under rebel control. Nevertheless, the government in Kinshasa issued a Decree-Law – 002/2002 dated 26 January 2002 – for the Congolese National Police for the whole country, even though it cannot be yet implemented in certain areas.

Historically, intelligence organisations in the Congo, and Zaire (1971–1997) included:

- Centre Nationale de Documentation (CND) (National Documentation Center) – 1969 – November 1983
- Agence Nationale de Documentation (AND) (National Documentation Agency) – November 1983 – August 1990
- Service National d'Intelligence et de Protection (SNIP) (National Service for Intelligence and Protection) – August 1990 – May 1997

== Contemporary ==
- Congolese National Police

Intelligence organisations in the Democratic Republic of the Congo from 1997–present include:

- Détection Militaire des Activités Anti-Patrie (DEMIAP) (Military Detection of Anti-Fatherland Activities)
- Agence nationale de renseignements – National Intelligence Agency

== See also ==
- Crime in the Democratic Republic of the Congo
