= Congolese National Police =

National police force of the Democratic Republic of the Congo

Congolese National Police Police nationale Congolaise
- Emblem of the Congolese National Police
- Common name: Police Nationale Congolaise
- Abbreviation: PNC

Agency overview
- Formed: 1997
- Employees: 100,000—150,000

Jurisdictional structure
- National agency: DR Congo
- Operations jurisdiction: DR Congo
- Map of Congolese National Police's jurisdiction
- Area: 2,345,409 km²
- Population: 111,050,097

Operational structure
- Headquarters: Kinshasa
- Agency executive: Dieudonne Amuli Bahigwa, Commissioner General
- Parent agency: Ministry of the Interior

The Congolese National Police (French: Police nationale congolaise, PNC) is the national police force of the Democratic Republic of the Congo. The national police consists of 110,000–150,000 officers and operates on the provincial level, answering to the Interior Ministry. It has gained notoriety in the Congo for corruption, repression of political dissidents, and other human rights abuses. It is currently undergoing reforms, and a police academy is being built.

The current Police Commissioner General is Dieudonne Amuli Bahigwa, a former Congolese army officer who replaced Charles Bisengimana in July 2017.

The former Kinshasa Police Commissioner, General Celestin Kanyama, was sanctioned by the United States in 2016 for his role in the violent crackdown of protestors during anti-government protests, and was consequently removed from his post in 2017.

The organisation's budget is approximately $257,130,643 (2015).

The PNC operates alongside the military police (police militaire or PM) to police the city of Kinshasa.

== History ==

PNC officers during the 2011 Democratic Republic of the Congo general election

The legislation "Decree-Law N° 002-2002 On institution, organization and functioning of the Congolese national police" from 26 January 2002 establishes the role of the National Police (PNC) of the DRC.

Starting in 2014, about 150 police officers part of the "Formed Police Unit" were deployed to the neighboring Central African Republic as part of a peacekeeping contingent, along with 850 FARDC troops.

In February 2019 Human Rights Watch accused the Congolese police of extrajudicially executing dozens of people during a crackdown on gangs in Kinshasa.

In March 2022, first lady Denise Nyakéru Tshisekedi visited the Congolese National Police in Kinshasa during training. They were working with MONUSCO police concerning gender mainstreaming in peacekeeping operations.

== Organization ==
- Directorate of Public Safety
- Directorate of General Intelligence
- Directorate of Civil Protection
- Directorate of the Border Police
- Directorate of River, Lake, Maritime, and Rail Communication Routes
- Directorate of the Scientific and Technical Police
- Directorate for Anti-Crime
- Directorate of Telecommunications and New Technologies
- Directorate of Countering Economic and Financial Crimes
- Directorate of Narcotics
- Directorate of Judicial Identification and the Central File
- National Central Bureau / INTERPOL
- Directorate of Human Resources
- Directorate of Budget and Finance
- Directorate of Logistics
- Directorate of Studies and Planning
- International Police Cooperation’s Department

== Specialized National Training Services and Central Services of the General Commissariat ==
- Institution and Important Figures Protection Unit
- National Intervention Legion
- Statistics Service
- Management and Maintenance of Infrastructure Service
- Telecommunications and Transmissions Services
- Health Service
- Social Affairs Service
- IT Service
- Information and Communication Service

== Weapons and Uniforms ==
Congolese police officers wear a blue uniform. Their service weapons are the Kalashnikov (7.62mm) though the large majority of officers on the streets do not carry weapons.

== Vehicles ==
The National Police often use Toyota Land Cruisers and 4x4s as well as trucks, some more specialised vehicles and they use smaller Toyota Yaris type vehicles in the city of Kinshasa.

== See also ==
- Law enforcement in the Democratic Republic of the Congo
- Crime in the Democratic Republic of the Congo
