= Genocide recognition politics =

Genocide recognition politics are efforts to have a certain event (re)interpreted as a "genocide" or officially designated as such. Such efforts may occur regardless of whether the event meets the definition of genocide laid out in the 1948 Genocide Convention. Acts of genocide recognition include acknowledgement of genocide in the adoption of laws, parliamentary resolutions, and official speeches, although according to lawyer Dean Kalimniou, institutional recognition by a public act of state is considered to have a profound distinction above any individual remark. Recognition politics may involve so-called "memory laws", including legislation that mandates recognition or criminalizes denial, which scholars debate in terms of free speech, historical authority, and international relations.

In countries with settler colonial pasts, recognition of colonial genocides is difficult as the national past could be called into question. Most recorded genocides have been perpetrated by states.

== By country ==
=== Canada ===
As of June 2021, the government of Canada officially recognises eight 20th and 21st Century historical events of ethnic extermination, agrarian reform or forced cultural assimilation that took place beyond its borders as genocide: the Armenian genocide (1915–1917), the Holodomor (1932–1933), the Holocaust (1941-1945), the Rwandan genocide (1994), the Srebrenica massacre (1995), the Genocide of Yazidis by ISIL (2014), the Uyghur genocide (2014–present; recognised by Canada in February 2021), and the Rohingya genocide (2016–present). Some activists and scholars such as Phil Fontaine and David Bruce MacDonald have argued that the Canadian government should also officially recognise various atrocities which were committed against the Indigenous peoples in Canada from the late 19th century until the mid-20th century as 'genocide', especially after the 2021 Canadian Indian residential schools gravesite discoveries. In October 2022, the House of Commons unanimously passed a motion to have the Canadian government officially recognize the residential school system as genocide against Indigenous populations.

=== Germany ===
Canadian political scientist David Bruce MacDonald stated in June 2021 that it is rare for governments to recognise genocides committed by previous administrations of the same country, citing Germany as an example: it has officially recognised the Holocaust (committed by Nazi Germany during the Second World War), and in May 2021 Germany officially recognised the Herero and Namaqua genocide (committed by the German Empire in 1904–1908).

=== Israel ===
On 21 November 2018, a bill tabled by opposition MP Ksenia Svetlova (ZU) to recognise the Islamic State's killing of Yazidis as a genocide was defeated in a 58 to 38 vote in the Knesset. The coalition parties motivated their rejection of the bill by saying that the United Nations had not yet recognised it as a genocide.

=== Netherlands ===
In their 2017–2021 coalition agreement published on 10 October 2017, the four parties forming the Third Rutte cabinet stated the following policy: "For the Dutch government, rulings from international courts of justice or criminal courts, unambiguous conclusions from scientific research, and findings by the UN, are leading in the recognition of genocides. The Netherlands act in accordance with the obligations arising from the Convention on the Prevention and Punishment of the Crime of Genocide. At the UN Security Council, the Netherlands are pro-active in combating ISIS and the prosecution of ISIS fighters." On 22 February 2018, the Dutch House of Representatives formally recognised the Armenian genocide with 147 votes out of 150; only the three MPs of the Dutch Turks-dominated party DENK opposed recognition as a "too one-sided explanation of history". Although the Dutch government stated it would not (yet) take a stand on whether it was a genocide, instead using the phrase "the Armenian genocide question", it agreed with MP Joël Voordewind's suggestion to send a government representative to attend Armenian Genocide Remembrance Day in Yerevan every 5 years "to show respect to all victims and survivors of all massacres against minorities", said Foreign Minister Sigrid Kaag. On 9 February 2021, a large majority of the House supported a motion calling on the government to fully recognise the Armenian genocide and dropping the phrase "the Armenian genocide question"; the only parties who did not support the call were the VVD, and again DENK. Inge Drost, spokesperson for the Federation Armenian Organisations Netherlands, stated in April 2021: "Every time recognition was brought up, it turned out to be a political bargaining tool. Then a country wanted get something out of Turkey, and threatened to recognise the Armenian genocide. Then eventually, it did not happen. It's a very sensitive issue for us."

=== United Kingdom ===
The legal department of the British Foreign, Commonwealth and Development Office has a long-standing policy, dating back to the 1948 passing of the Genocide Convention, of refusing to give a legal description to potential war crimes. For this reason, it has sought to dissuade any UK governmental institution from making claims about genocide. On 20 April 2016, the House of Commons of the United Kingdom unanimously supported a motion to declare that the treatment of Yazidis and Christians by the Islamic State amounted to genocide, to condemn it as such, and to refer the issue to the UN Security Council. It was almost unprecedented for British parliamentarians to collectively to declare war-time actions as genocide, because in doing so, Conservative MPs defied their fellow party members in the UK government. Foreign Office secretary Tobias Ellwood – who was jeered at and interrupted by MPs during his speech in the debate – stated that he personally believed genocide had taken place, but that it was not up to politicians to make that determination, but to the courts.

=== United States ===
Between 1989 and 2022, the United States Department of State has formally recognized eight genocides: in Bosnia (1993), Rwanda (1994), Iraq (1995), Darfur (2004), and areas under the control of ISIS (2016 and 2017). During the last days of the Trump administration the Uyghur genocide was recognized, a decision affirmed by the Biden administration, which also recognized the Armenian genocide in April 2021 and the Rohingya genocide in Burma/Myanmar, with the determination coming in March 2022. Three other cases were considered, namely Burundi in the mid-1990s, Sudan's "Two Areas" in 2013, and Burma in 2018, but ultimately the process of recognition was not completed. A March 2019 USHMM report by Buchwald & Keith stated: "No formal policy exists or has existed to guide how or when the US government decides whether genocide has occurred and whether to state its conclusion publicly." However, there are two memoranda – the first written by Secretary of State Warren Christopher in May 1994 regarding Rwanda, and the second by Secretary of State Colin Powell in June 2004 regarding Darfur – that provide some insight into the decision-making process, and advise or authorise U.S. government officials on what to do in genocide recognition questions.

== By event ==
=== Pacification of Algeria ===
According to several historians, the methods used by the French to establish control over Algeria reached genocidal proportions, with war, famine and disease leading to the deaths of between 500,000 and 1 million Algerians within the first three decades of the conquest, out of an estimated population of 3 million. French losses from 1831 to 1851 were 3,336 killed in battle and 92,329 dead in hospital from disease and lack of medical care, rising to over 150,000 by 1870. A conservative estimate puts the total deaths on both sides at 480,000 (civilians and soldiers, mostly from disease).

Some governments and scholars have called France's conquest of Algeria a genocide, such as Raphael Lemkin, who coined the word "genocide" in the 20th century and Ben Kiernan, an Australian expert on the Cambodian genocide, who wrote in Blood and Soil: A World History of Genocide and Extermination from Sparta to Darfur on the French conquest of Algeria:

By 1875, the French conquest was complete. The war had killed approximately 825,000 indigenous Algerians since 1830. A long shadow of genocidal hatred persisted, provoking a French author to protest in 1882 that in Algeria, "we hear it repeated every day that we must expel the native and if necessary destroy him." As a French statistical journal urged five years late, "the system of extermination must give way to a policy of penetration."

— Ben Kiernan, Blood and Soil

=== Anfal campaign ===
The Kurdistan Regional Government has set aside 14 April as a day of remembrance for the Al-Anfal campaign. In Sulaymanya a museum was established in the former prison of the Directorate of General Security. Many Iraqi Arabs reject that any mass killings of Kurds occurred during the Anfal campaign.

On 28 February 2013, the British House of Commons formally recognized the Anfal as genocide following a campaign led by Conservative MP Nadhim Zahawi, who is of Kurdish descent.

=== Armenian genocide ===
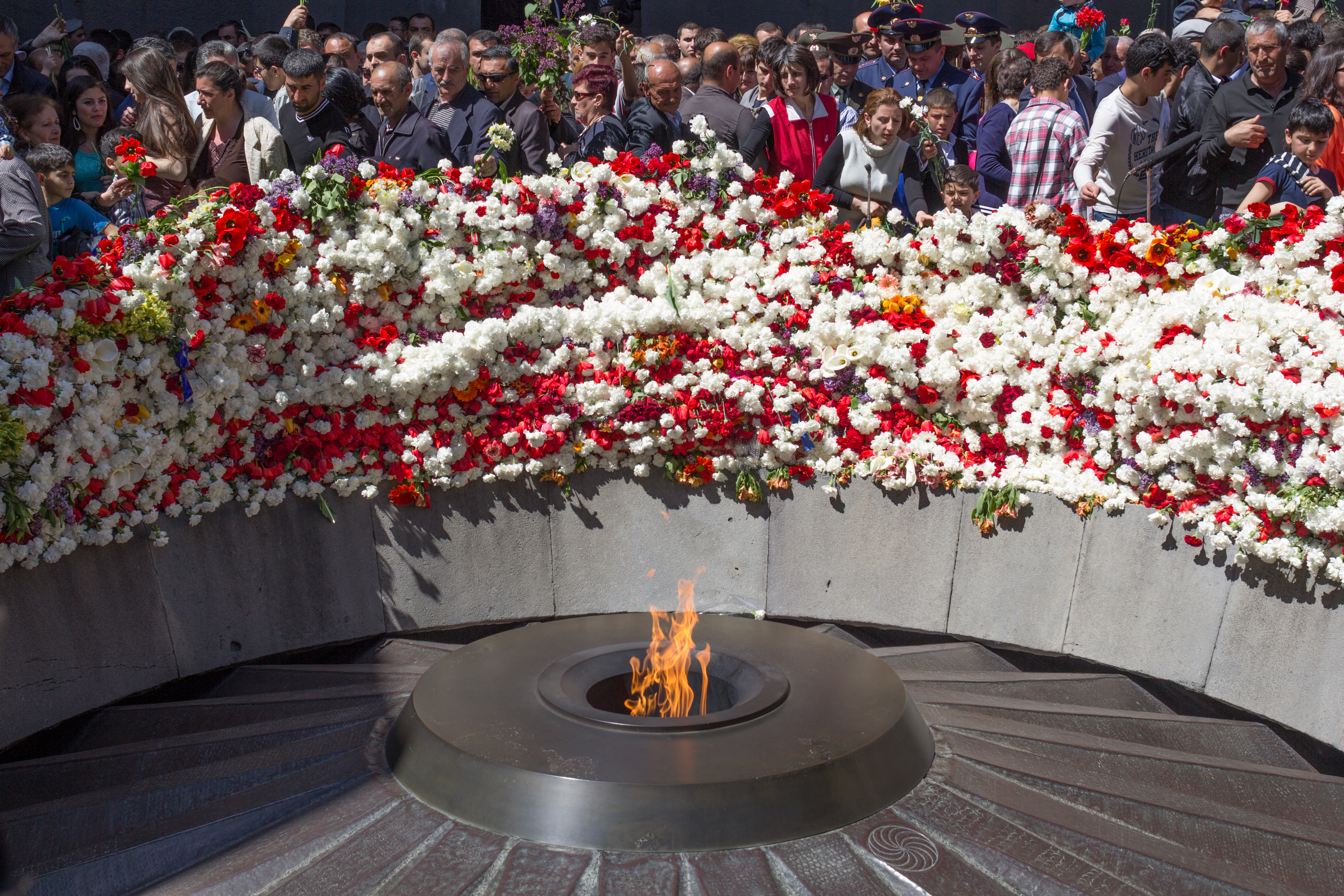
The eternal flame at the center of the twelve slabs, located at the Armenian Genocide Memorial complex in Yerevan, Armenia

The recognition of the Armenian genocide is the acknowledgement of the fact that the Ottoman Empire's systematic massacres and forced deportation of Armenians from 1915 to 1923, both during and after the First World War, constituted genocide.

Outside of Turkey and Azerbaijan, the historical consensus is that the Ottoman Empire's persecution of Armenians was a genocide. Despite this consensus, some governments have been reticent to officially acknowledge the killings as genocide, due to political concerns regarding their relations with the Turkish government.

The Turkish government has demanded Armenia abandon genocide recognition efforts as a condition for normalizing diplomatic relations and lifting the ongoing Turkish-Azeri blockade of Armenia. In contrast, Armenia has consistently advocated for establishing diplomatic relations with Turkey and reopening the border without any preconditions.

As of 2026, the governments and parliaments of 34 countries, including Argentina, Austria, Brazil, Canada, France, Germany, Greece, Italy, Mexico, the Netherlands, Poland, Portugal, Russia, Sweden, the United States and Uruguay, have formally recognized the Armenian genocide, Uruguay having been the first nation to do so. The governments of Azerbaijan, Turkey, and Pakistan deny the genocide.

=== Anti-Sikh riots ===
The 1984 anti-Sikh riots, also known as the 1984 Sikh Massacre, was a series of organised pogroms against Sikhs in India following the assassination of Indira Gandhi by her Sikh bodyguards. The ruling Indian National Congress had been in active complicity with the mob, as to the organisation of the riots. Government estimates project that about 2,800 Sikhs were killed in Delhi and 3,350 nationwide, whilst independent sources estimate the number of deaths at about 8,000–17,000.

The riots caused a major discontent among Sikh separatists living overseas, particularly in Canada. As a result of the riots, the Babbar Khalsa, a Sikh separatist group, planted a bomb on board Air India flight 182, a Boeing 747-200, which was flying from Montréal to Delhi, with a stopover at London on 23 June 1985. Flight 182 was blown up over the mid-Atlantic, killing 307 passengers and 22 crew on board. The separatist group also planned to blow up Air India flight 301, another Boeing 747, but the bomb exploded at Narita Airport in Tokyo, Japan, before it could be loaded, killing 2 baggage handlers. However, while the conspirators meant for both bombings to occur simultaneously, they neglected to take into account that Japan does not observe daylight saving time, unlike Canada.

On 11 August 2005, then Prime Minister of India Dr. Manmohan Singh apologised in the Lok Sabha for the riots. The riots are cited as a reason to support the creation of a Sikh homeland in India, often called Khalistan.

On 15 January 2017, the Wall of Truth was inaugurated in Lutyens' Delhi, New Delhi, as a memorial for Sikhs killed during the 1984 riots (and other hate crimes across the world).

On 4 May 2025, then leader of the Opposition in Lok Sabha Rahul Gandhi said that he was "wasn’t there during many Congress’ mistakes, but happy to take responsibility" of the riots.

=== Assyrian genocide (Sayfo) ===
The Sayfo is less well known than the Armenian genocide, partially because its targets were divided among mutually-antagonistic churches and did not develop a collective identity. During the 1990s, before the first academic research on the Sayfo, Assyrian diaspora groups (inspired by campaigns for Armenian genocide recognition) began to press for a similar formal acknowledgement. In parallel with the political campaign, Armenian genocide research began to include Assyrians as victims. In December 2007, the International Association of Genocide Scholars passed a resolution recognizing the Assyrian genocide. The Sayfo is also recognized as a genocide in resolutions passed by Sweden (in 2010), Armenia (2015), the Netherlands (2015), and Germany (in 2016). Memorials in Armenia, Australia, Belgium, France, Greece, Sweden, Ukraine, and the United States commemorate victims of the Sayfo.

=== Atrocities in the Congo Free State ===
... It was indeed a holocaust before Hitler's Holocaust. ... What happened in the heart of Africa was genocidal in scope long before that now familiar term, genocide, was ever coined.

— Historian Robert Weisbord (2003)

The significant number of deaths under the Free State regime has led some scholars to relate the atrocities to later genocides, though understanding of the losses under the colonial administration's rule as the result of harsh economic exploitation rather than a policy of deliberate extermination has led others to dispute the comparison; there is an open debate as to whether the atrocities constitute genocide. According to the United Nations' 1948 definition of the term "genocide", a genocide must be "acts committed with intent to destroy, in whole or in part, a national, ethnical, racial or religious group". According to Georgi Verbeeck, this conventional definition of genocide has prevented most historians from using the term to describe atrocities in the Free State; in the strict sense of the term, some historians have rejected allegations of genocide.

Sociologist Rhoda Howard-Hassmann stated that because the Congolese were not killed in a systematic fashion according to this criterion, "technically speaking, this was not genocide even in a legally retroactive sense." Adam Hochschild and political scientist Georges Nzongola-Ntalaja rejected allegations of genocide in the Free State because there was no evidence of a policy of deliberate extermination or the desire to eliminate any specific population groups, though the latter added that nevertheless there was "a death toll of Holocaust proportions", which led him to call it "the Congo holocaust".

... no reputable historian of the Congo has made charges of genocide; a forced labor system, although it may be equally deadly, is different.

— Historian Adam Hochschild (2005)

It is generally agreed by historians that extermination was never the policy of the Free State. According to David Van Reybrouck, "It would be absurd ... to speak of an act of 'genocide' or a 'holocaust'; genocide implies the conscious, planned annihilation of a specific population, and that was never the intention here, or the result ... But it was definitely a hecatomb, a slaughter on a staggering scale that was not intentional, but could have been recognised much earlier as the collateral damage of a perfidious, rapacious policy of exploitation". Historian Barbara Emerson stated, "Leopold did not start genocide. He was greedy for money and chose not to interest himself when things got out of control." According to Hochschild, "while not a case of genocide, in the strict sense", the atrocities in the Congo were "one of the most appalling slaughters known to have been brought about by human agency". (Note: As a comparison, Hochschild labelled the German extermination of the Herero in South-West Africa (1904–1907) a genocide because of its defined, systematic and intentional nature.)

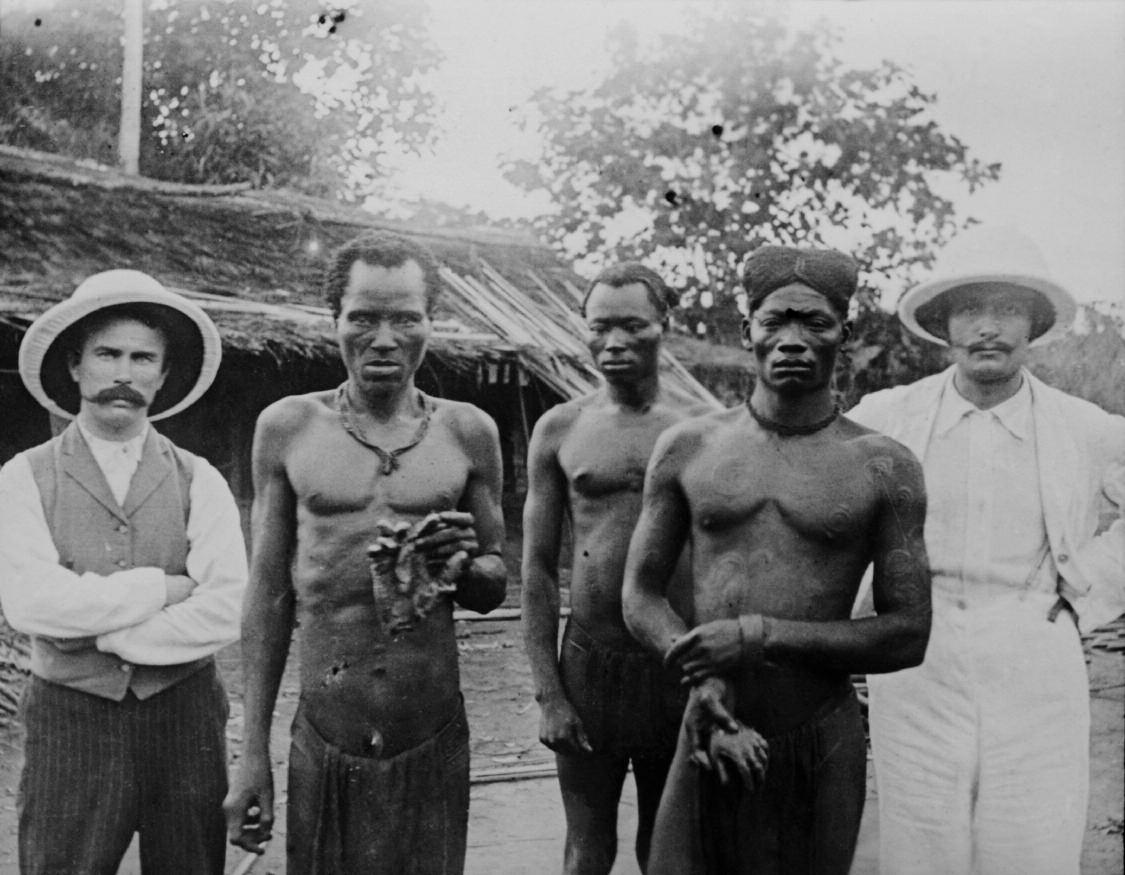
Picture of "Congolese men holding cut off hands" captured by Alice Seeley Harris in Baringa, May 1904

Historians have argued that comparisons drawn in the press by some between the death toll of the Free State atrocities and the Holocaust during World War II have been responsible for creating undue confusion over the issue of terminology. In one incident, the Japanese newspaper Yomiuri Shimbun used the word "genocide" in the title of a 2005 article by Hochschild. Hochschild himself criticised the title as "misleading" and stated that it had been chosen "without my knowledge". Similar criticism was echoed by historian Jean-Luc Vellut.

Allegations of genocide in the Free State have become common over time. Martin Ewans wrote, "Leopold's African regime became a byword for exploitation and genocide." According to historian Timothy J. Stapleton, "Those who easily apply the term genocide to Leopold's regime seem to do so purely on the basis of its obvious horror and the massive numbers of people who may have perished." Robert Weisbord argued that there does not have to be intent to exterminate all members of a population in a genocide. He posited that "an endeavor to eliminate a portion of a people would qualify as genocide" according to the UN standards and asserted that the Free State did as much. Jeanne Haskin, Yaa-Lengi Meema Ngemi, and David Olusoga also referred to the atrocities as a genocide.

In an unpublished manuscript from the 1950s, Lemkin, who had first coined the term "genocide" in 1944, asserted the occurrence of "an unambiguous genocide" in the Free State, though he blamed the violence on what he saw as "the savagery of African colonial troops". Lemkin emphasised that the atrocities were usually committed by Africans themselves who were in the pay of the Belgians. These "native militia" were described by Lemkin as "an unorganized and disorderly rabble of savages whose only recompense was what they obtained from looting, and when they were cannibals, as was usually the case, in eating the foes against whom they were sent". Genocide scholar Adam Jones claimed that the underrepresentation of males in Congolese population figures after Leopold's rule is evidence that "outright genocide" was the cause of a large portion of deaths in the Free State.

In 1999 Hochschild published King Leopold's Ghost, a book detailing the atrocities committed during the Free State's existence. The book became a bestseller in Belgium, but aroused criticism from former Belgian colonialists and some academics as exaggerating the extent of the atrocities and population decline. Around the 50th anniversary of the Congo's independence from Belgium in 2010, numerous Belgian writers published content about the Congo. Historian Idesbald Goddeeris criticised these works—including Van Reybrouk's Congo: A History—for taking a softened stance on the atrocities committed in the Congolese Free State, saying "They acknowledge the dark period of the Congo Free State, but ... they emphasize that the number of victims was unknown and that the terror was concentrated in particular regions."

The term "Congolese genocide" is also used to refer to the mass murder and rape committed in the eastern Congo in the aftermath of the Rwandan genocide (and the ensuing Second Congo War) between 1998 and 2003.

=== Black War ===
The near-destruction of Tasmania's Aboriginal population has been described as an act of genocide by historians and genocide scholars including Robert Hughes, James Boyce, Lyndall Ryan, Tom Lawson, Mohamed Adhikari, Benjamin Madley, Ashley Riley Sousa, Rebe Taylor, and Tony Barta. The author of the concept of genocide, Raphael Lemkin, considered Tasmania the site of one of the world's clear cases of genocide and Hughes has described the loss of Aboriginal Tasmanians as "the only true genocide in English colonial history". Other historians – including Henry Reynolds, Richard Broome, and Nicholas Clements – do not agree that the colonial authorities pursued a policy of destroying the Indigenous population, although they do acknowledge that some settlers supported extermination.

Boyce states that the April 1828 "Proclamation Separating the Aborigines from the White Inhabitants" sanctioned force against Aboriginal people "for no other reason than that they were Aboriginal". Reynolds, Broome and Clements state there was open warfare at the time. Boyce describes the decision to remove all Aboriginal Tasmanians after 1832—by which time they had given up their fight against white colonists—as an extreme policy position. He concludes: "The colonial government from 1832 to 1838 ethnically cleansed the western half of Van Diemen's Land and then callously left the exiled people to their fate."

As early as 1852 John West's History of Tasmania portrayed the obliteration of Tasmania's Aboriginal people as an example of "systematic massacre" and in the 1979 High Court case of Coe v Commonwealth of Australia, judge Lionel Murphy observed that Aboriginal people did not give up their land peacefully and that they were killed or forcibly removed from their land "in what amounted to attempted (and in Tasmania almost complete) genocide".

Historian Henry Reynolds writes that there was a widespread call from settlers during the frontier wars for the "extirpation" or "extermination" of the Aboriginal people. But he has contended that the British government acted as a source of restraint on settlers' actions. Reynolds says there is no evidence the British government deliberately planned the wholesale destruction of indigenous Tasmanians—a November 1830 letter to Arthur by Sir George Murray warned that the extinction of the race would leave "an indelible stain upon the character of the British Government"—and therefore what eventuated does not meet the definition of genocide codified in the 1948 United Nations convention. He says that Arthur was determined to defeat the Aboriginal people and take their land, but believes that there is little evidence that he had aims beyond that objective and wished to destroy the Tasmanian race. In contrast to Reynolds' argument, historian Lyndall Ryan, based on a sample of massacres taking place in the Meander River region in June 1827, concludes that massacres of Aboriginal Tasmanians by white settlers were likely part of an organised process and were sanctioned by government authorities.

Clements accepts Reynolds' argument but also exonerates the colonists themselves of the charge of genocide. He says that, unlike genocidal determinations by Nazis against Jews in World War II, Hutus against Tutsis in Rwanda and Ottomans against Armenians in present-day Turkey which were carried out for ideological reasons, Tasmanian settlers participated in violence largely out of revenge and self-preservation. He adds: "Even those who were motivated by sex or morbid thrillseeking lacked any ideological impetus to exterminate the natives." He also argues that while genocides are inflicted on defeated, captive or otherwise vulnerable minorities, Tasmanian natives appeared as a "capable and terrifying enemy" to colonists and were killed in the context of a war in which both sides killed noncombatants.

Lawson, in a critique of Reynolds' stand, argues that genocide was the inevitable outcome of a set of British policies to colonise Van Diemen's Land. He writes that the British government endorsed the use of partitioning and "absolute force" against Tasmanians, approved Robinson's "Friendly Mission" and colluded in transforming that mission into a campaign of ethnic cleansing from 1832. He writes that once on Flinders Island, the indigenous peoples were taught to both farm land like Europeans and worship God like Europeans and concludes: "The campaign of transformation enacted on Flinders Island amounted to cultural genocide."

Writing in 2023, historian Rebe Taylor states that Windschuttle is in a minority among historians who generally accept the Black War as a case of genocide.

=== Bosnian genocide ===
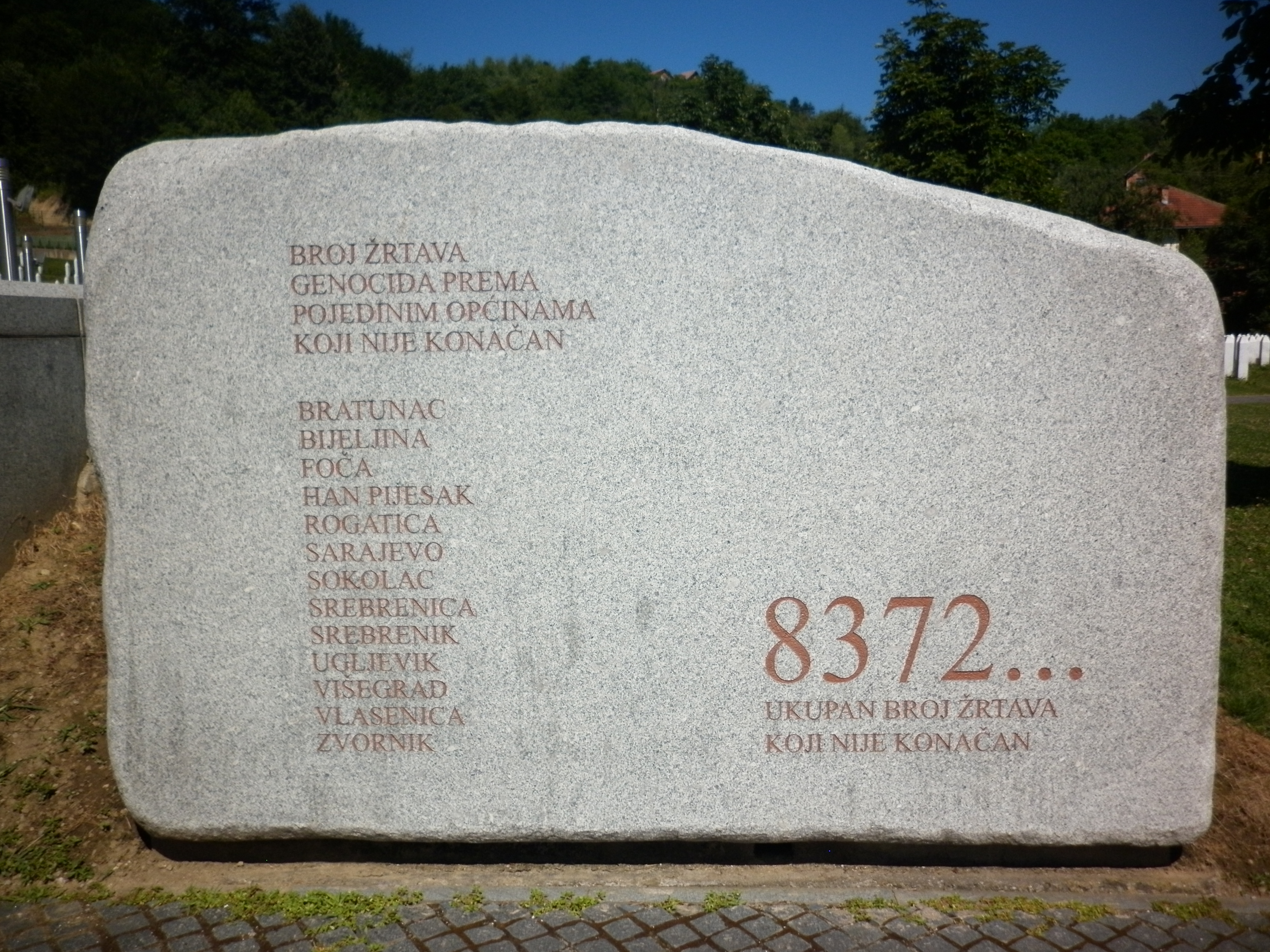
Memorial stone at the Srebrenica-Potočari Memorial Centre

The term "Bosnian genocide" refers to either the Srebrenica massacre, or the wider crimes against humanity and ethnic cleansing campaign which was waged throughout the areas of Bosnia and Herzegovina which were controlled by the Army of Republika Srpska (VRS) during the Bosnian War of 1992–1995. The events in Srebrenica in 1995 included the killing of more than 8,000 Bosniak (Bosnian Muslim) men and boys, as well as the mass expulsion of another 25,000–30,000 Bosniak civilians by VRS units under the command of General Ratko Mladić.

In the 1990s, several authorities asserted that the ethnic cleansing campaign which was carried out by elements of the Bosnian Serb army was a genocide. These included a resolution by the United Nations General Assembly and three convictions for genocide in German courts (the convictions were based upon a wider interpretation of genocide than that used by international courts). In 2005, the United States Congress passed a resolution declaring that "the Serbian policies of aggression and ethnic cleansing meet the terms defining genocide."

The Srebrenica massacre was found to be an act of genocide by the International Criminal Tribunal for the Former Yugoslavia (ICTY), a finding which was upheld by the International Court of Justice (ICJ). On 24 March 2016, former Bosnian Serb leader and the first president of the Republika Srpska, Radovan Karadžić, was found guilty of genocide in Srebrenica, war crimes, and crimes against humanity and sentenced to 40 years in prison. In 2019 an appeals court increased his sentence to life imprisonment. The ICTY found the acts to have satisfied the requirements for "guilty acts" of genocide, and that, "some physical perpetrators held the intent to physically destroy the protected groups of Bosnian Muslims and Croats".

=== California genocide ===
In a speech before representatives of Native American peoples in June 2019, California governor Gavin Newsom apologized for the genocide. Newsom referring to the proposed California Truth and Healing Council said, "California must reckon with our dark history. California Native American peoples suffered violence, discrimination and exploitation sanctioned by state government throughout its history .... It's called genocide. That's what it was, a genocide. No other way to describe it. And that's the way it needs to be described in the history books. We can never undo the wrongs inflicted on the peoples who have lived on this land that we now call California since time immemorial, but we can work together to build bridges, tell the truth about our past and begin to heal deep wounds." After hearing testimony, a Truth and Healing Council will clarify the historical record on the relationship between the state of California and American Indians.

In November 2021, the board of directors of the former "University of California Hastings College of Law" voted to change the name of the institution because of its founder and namesake S. C. Hastings's alleged involvement in the killing and dispossessing of Yuki people in the 1850s. The name change was approved via an act of the California Legislature (California Assembly Bill 1936, 2021–2022 regular session) and was signed into law by the governor on 23 September 2022. The name change took effect on January 1, 2023. The institution is now known as the University of California College of the Law, San Francisco.

In April 2024, Governor Newsom announced California's support for returning ancestral tribal lands to Indigenous communities, describing the initiative as "an acknowledgment of past sins, a promise of accountability, and a commitment to a better future". The California Truth and Healing Council, established pursuant to Newsom's 2019 executive order, was charged with examining the historical relationship between the state and Native Americans, with authority to make recommendations on reparation and restoration measures.

Scholarly research has influenced contemporary recognition debates, particularly following historian Benjamin Madley's archival study concluding that state-supported violence against Native Californians between 1846 and 1873 met the criteria for genocide under international law.

=== Circassian genocide ===
On 20 May 2011, the Parliament of Georgia passed a resolution stating that pre-planned mass killings of Circassians by Imperial Russia, accompanied by "deliberate famine and epidemics", should be recognized as "genocide", and that those deported during those events from their homeland should be recognized as "refugees". The parliament declared in its resolution that the mass annihilation of the Cherkess (Adyghe) people during the Russian-Circassian war and thereafter constituted genocide as defined in the Hague Convention of 1907 and the UN Convention of 1948. Georgia has made outreach efforts to North Caucasian ethnic groups since the 2008 Russo-Georgian War. Following a consultation with academics, human rights activists and Circassian diaspora groups and parliamentary discussions in Tbilisi in 2010 and 2011, Georgia became the first country to use the word "genocide" to refer to the events. The next year, on 21 May, a monument was erected in Anaklia, Georgia, to commemorate the suffering of the Circassians. On 16 February 2012, the Georgian government opened a Circassian Cultural Centre in Tbilisi to study and promote the history and culture of the Circassians and other Caucasian peoples. The opening was attended by members of the Circassian diaspora from the United States and Europe and was welcomed by Iyad Yogar, president of the US Circassian Cultural Institute.

=== Deportation of the Chechens and Ingush ===
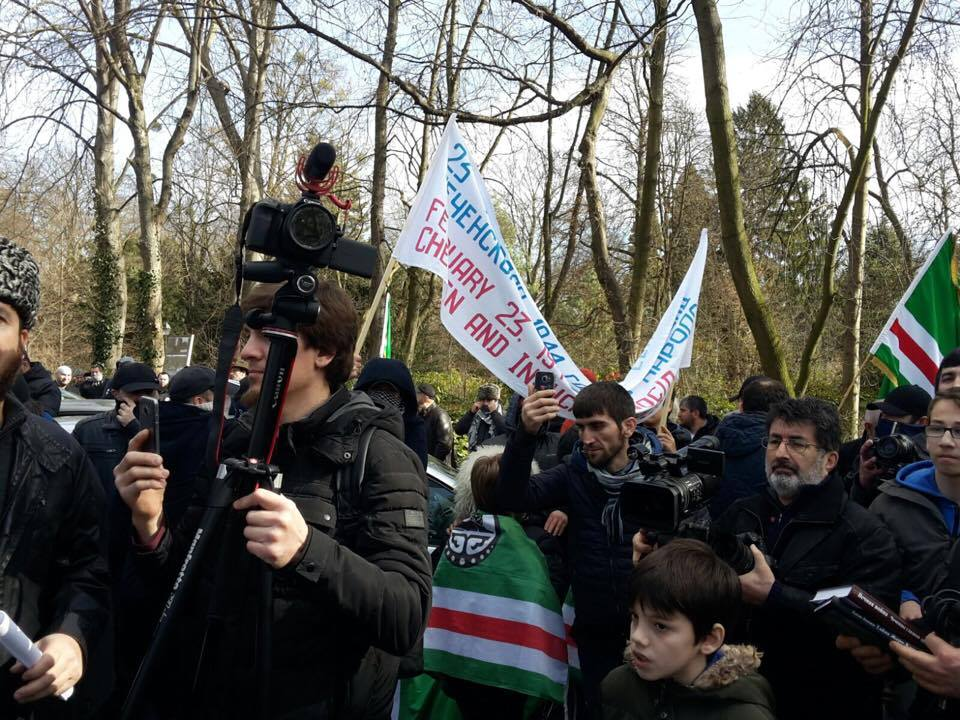
Meeting in Strasbourg on 23 February 2017 dedicated to the anniversary of deportation

The forced relocation, slaughter, and conditions during and after transfer have been described as an act of genocide by various scholars as well as the European Parliament on the basis of the IV Hague Convention of 1907 and the Convention on the Prevention and Punishment of the Crime of Genocide of the U.N. General Assembly (adopted in 1948), including French historian and expert on communist studies Nicolas Werth, German historian Philipp Ther, Professor Anthony James Joes, American journalist Eric Margolis, Canadian political scientist Adam Jones, professor of Islamic History at the University of Massachusetts Dartmouth Brian Glyn Williams, scholars Michael Fredholm and Fanny E. Bryan. Raphael Lemkin, a lawyer of Polish-Jewish descent who initiated the Genocide Convention, assumed that genocide was perpetrated in the context of the mass deportation of the Chechens, Ingush, Volga Germans, Crimean Tatars, Kalmyks and Karachay. German investigative journalist Lutz Kleveman compared the deportation to a "slow genocide". In this case this was acknowledged by the European Parliament as an act of genocide in 2004:

...Believes that the deportation of the entire Chechen people to Central Asia on 23 February 1944 on the orders of Stalin constitutes an act of genocide within the meaning of the Fourth Hague Convention of 1907 and the Convention for the Prevention and Repression of the Crime of Genocide adopted by the UN General Assembly on 9 December 1948.

On 26 April 1991 the Supreme Soviet of the Russian Socialist Federal Soviet Republic, under its chairman Boris Yeltsin, passed the law On the Rehabilitation of Repressed Peoples with Article 2 denouncing all mass deportations as "Stalin's policy of defamation and genocide." Experts of the United States Holocaust Memorial Museum cited the events of 1944 for a reason of placing Chechnya on their genocide watch list for its potential for genocide. The separatist government of Chechnya also recognized it as genocide. Members of the Chechen diaspora and their supporters promote 23 February as World Chechnya Day to commemorate the victims.

The Chechens and Ingush, along with the Karachai and Balkars, are represented in the Confederation of Repressed Peoples (CRP), an organization that covers the former Soviet Union and aims to support and rehabilitate the rights of the deported peoples.

=== Deportation of the Crimean Tatars ===
Some activists, politicians, scholars, countries, and historians go even further and consider the deportation a crime of genocide or cultural genocide. Norman Naimark writes "[t]he Chechens and Ingush, the Crimean Tatars, and other 'punished peoples' of the wartime period were, indeed, slated for elimination, if not physically, then as self-identifying nationalities." Professor Lyman H. Legters argued that the Soviet penal system, combined with its resettlement policies, should count as genocidal since the sentences were borne most heavily specifically on certain ethnic groups, and that a relocation of these ethnic groups, whose survival depends on ties to its particular homeland, "had a genocidal effect remediable only by restoration of the group to its homeland." Political scientist Stephen Blank described it both as a deportation and a genocide, a centuries-long Russian "technique of self-colonial rule intended to eliminate" minorities. Soviet dissidents Ilya Gabay and Pyotr Grigorenko both classified the event as a genocide. Historian Timothy Snyder included it in a list of Soviet policies that "meet the standard of genocide." Historians Alexandre Bennigsen and Marie Bennigsen-Broxup included the case of Crimean Tatars and Meskhetian Turks as two examples of successful genocides by Soviet governments. They summed it up by saying that Crimean Tatars, "a nation which for over five centuries had played a major part in the history of Eastern Europe has simply ceased to exist". Polish scholar Tomasz Kamusella observed that Moscow attempted an "unmaking of Crimean Tatars and their language" by not allowing them even to be registered as Crimean Tatars since the deportation; they could only declare themselves as Tatars. It wasn't until the 1989 census that Crimean Tatars were again recognized as a separate nationality. The Crimean Tatar language was only allowed to be taught again in Soviet schools in the 1980s.

On 12 December 2015, the Ukrainian parliament issued a resolution recognizing this event as genocide and established 18 May as the "Day of Remembrance for the victims of the Crimean Tatar genocide." The parliament of Latvia recognized the event as an act of genocide on 9 May 2019. The parliament of Lithuania did the same on 6 June 2019. The Canadian Parliament passed a motion on June 10, 2019, recognizing the Crimean Tatar deportation of 1944 (Sürgünlik) as a genocide perpetrated by Soviet dictator Stalin, designating May 18 to be a day of remembrance. On 26 April 1991 the Supreme Soviet of the Russian Soviet Federative Socialist Republic, under its chairman Boris Yeltsin, passed the law On the Rehabilitation of Repressed Peoples with Article 2 denouncing all mass deportations as "Stalin's policy of defamation and genocide."

#	Name	Date of recognition	Source
1	Ukraine	12 December 2015	
2	Latvia	9 May 2019	
3	Lithuania	6 June 2019	
4	Canada	10 June 2019	
5	Poland	12 July 2024	
6	Estonia	16 October 2024	
7	Czech Republic	18 December 2024	
8	Netherlands	20 June 2025	

A minority dispute defining the event as genocide. According to Alexander Statiev, the Soviet deportations resulted in a "genocidal death rate", but Stalin did not have the intent to exterminate these peoples. He considers such deportations merely an example of Soviet assimilation of "unwanted nations". According to Amir Weiner, the Soviet regime sought to eradicate "only" their "territorial identity". Such views were criticized by Jon Chang as "gentrified racism" and historical revisionism. He noted that the deportations had been in fact based on ethnicity of victims.

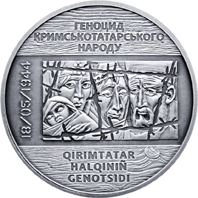
Ukrainian coin commemorating the Genocide of the Crimean Tatars, issued 2015

The projection mapping in Kyiv in 2020 for the Day of Remembrance for the victims of the Crimean Tatar genocide

=== Draining of the Mesopotamian Marshes ===
The Mesopotamian Marshes were drained in Iraq and to a smaller degree in Iran between the 1950s and 1990s to clear large areas of the marshes in the Tigris-Euphrates river system. The marshes formerly covered an area of around 20,000 km^{2} (7,700 mi^{2}). The main sub-marshes, the Hawizeh, Central, and Hammar marshes, were drained at different times for different reasons.

In the 1990s, the marshes were drained for political motives, namely to force the Marsh Arabs (or Ahwaris) out of the area and to punish them for their role in the 1991 uprising against Saddam Hussein's government. However, the government's stated reasoning was to reclaim land for agriculture and exterminate breeding grounds for mosquitoes. The displacement of more than 200,000 of the Ahwaris, and the associated state-sponsored campaign of violence against them, has led the United States and others to describe the draining of the marshes as ecocide, ethnic cleansing, or genocide.

The draining of the Mesopotamian Marshes has been described by the United Nations as a "tragic human and environmental catastrophe" on par with the deforestation of the Amazon rainforest and by other observers as one of the worst environmental disasters of the 20th century.

=== Gaza genocide ===
Since October 2023, the government of Israel has been accused of committing genocide against the Palestinian population of the Gaza Strip during the Gaza war by several countries across the world. The government of South Africa formally accused the country of genocide in December that year in a case before the International Court of Justice, with 14 countries joining on the side of South Africa by December the next year. Explicit state positions on the genocide include recognition, denial, or deferral to the ultimate result of the pending case. Some countries have been described as silent regarding the matter.

=== Genocide of Yazidis by ISIL ===
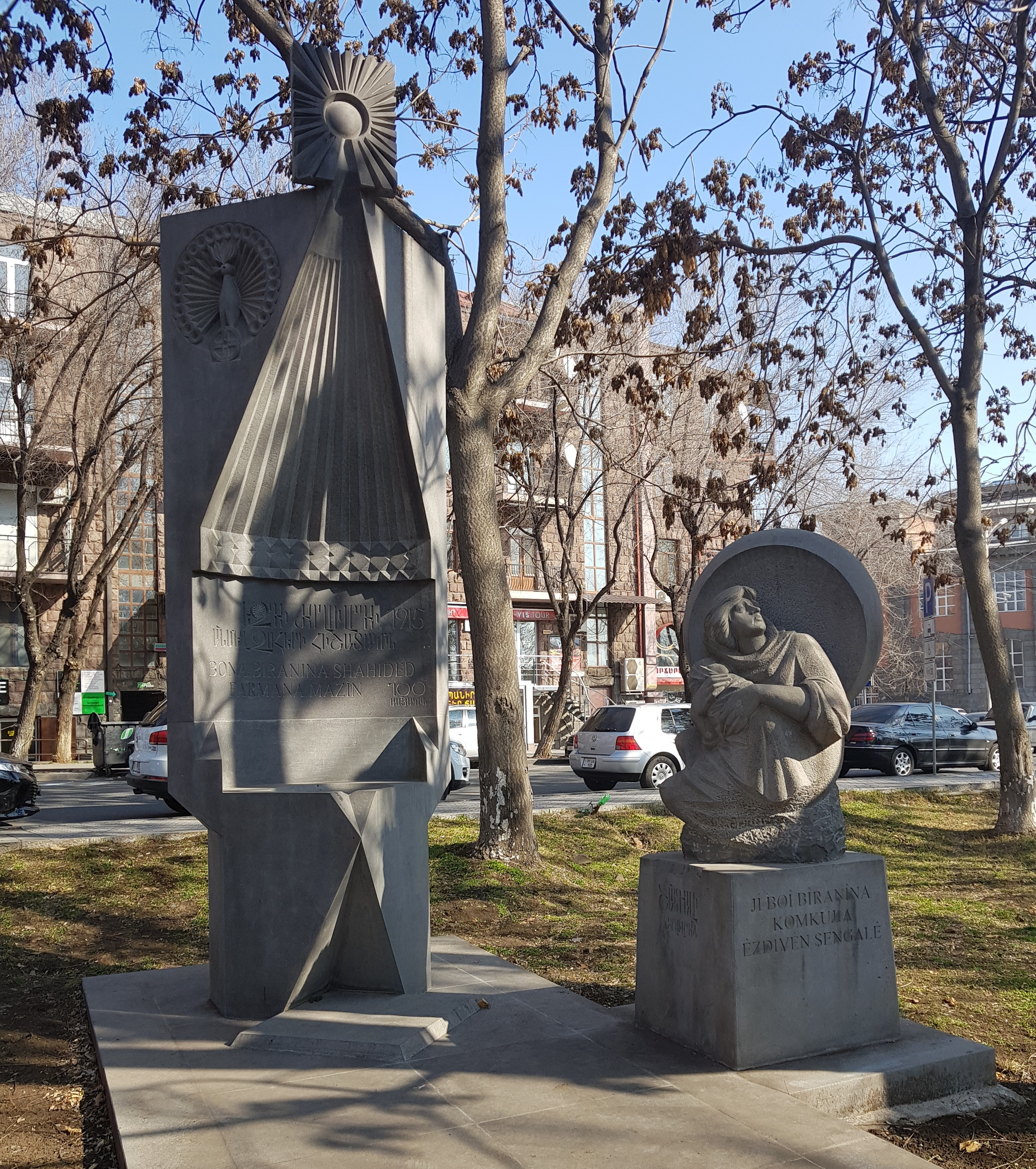
Yezidi Genocide Monument in Yerevan, Armenia

Many international organisations, governments and parliaments, as well as groups, have classified IS's treatment of the Yezidis as a genocide, and they have also condemned it as such. Additionally, the Genocide of Yezidis has officially been recognized as a genocide by several bodies of the United Nations and the European Parliament. Some states have recognized it as well, including the National Assembly of Armenia, the Australian parliament, the British Parliament, the Canadian parliament, and the United States House of Representatives. Multiple individual human rights activists such as Nazand Begikhani and Dr. Widad Akrawi have also advocated this view.

In 2017, CNN journalists Jomana Karadsheh and Chris Jackson interviewed former Yezidi captives and exclusively filmed the Daesh Criminal Investigations Unit (DCIU), a team of Iraqi Kurdish and western investigators who have been operating secretly in Northern Iraq, for more than two years, collecting evidence of IS' war crimes.

- United Nations:
  - In a March 2015 report, the persecution of the Yezidi people was qualified as a genocide by the Office of the United Nations High Commissioner for Human Rights (UNHCR). The organization cited the numerous atrocities such as forced religious conversion and sexual slavery as being parts of an overall malicious campaign.
  - In August 2017, the Independent International Commission of Inquiry on the Syrian Arab Republic of the United Nations Human Rights Council (UNHRC) stated that "IS committed the crime of genocide by seeking to destroy the Yazidis through killings, sexual slavery, enslavement, torture, forcible displacement, the transfer of children and measures intended to prohibit the birth of Yazidi children." It added that the genocide was ongoing, and stating that the international community still must recognize the detrimental effects of the genocide. The Commission wrote that, while some countries may choose to overlook the idea of the genocide, the atrocities need to be understood and the international community needs to bring the killings to an end.
  - In 2018, the Security Council team enforced the idea of a new accountability team that would collect evidence of the international crimes committed by the Islamic State. However, the international community has not been in full support of this idea, because it can sometimes oversee the crimes that other armed groups are involved in.
  - On 10 May 2021, the United Nations Investigative Team to Promote Accountability for Crimes Committed by Da'esh/IS (UNITAD) determined that IS's actions in Iraq constituted genocide.
- Council of Europe: On 27 January 2016, the Parliamentary Assembly of the Council of Europe adopted a resolution stating: "individuals who act in the name of the terrorist entity which calls itself 'Islamic State' (Daesh) ... have perpetrated acts of genocide and other serious crimes punishable under international law. States should act on the presumption that Daesh commits genocide and should be aware that this entails action under the 1948 United Nations Convention on the Prevention and Punishment of the Crime of Genocide." However, it did not identify victims.
- European Union: On 4 February 2016, the European Parliament unanimously passed a resolution to recognise 'that the so-called 'ISIS/Daesh' is committing genocide against Christians and Yezidis, and other religious and ethnic minorities, who do not agree with the so-called 'ISIS/Daesh' interpretation of Islam, and that this therefore entails action under the 1948 United Nations Convention on the Prevention and Punishment of the Crime of Genocide.' Additionally, it called for those who intentionally committed atrocities for ethnic or religious reasons to be brought to justice for violating international law, and committing crimes against humanity, and genocide.
- United States: The United States Department of State has formally recognised the Yezidi genocide in areas under the control of IS in 2016 and 2017. On 14 March 2016, the United States House of Representatives voted unanimously 393-0 that violent actions performed against Yezidis, Christians, Shia and other groups by IS were acts of genocide. Days later on 17 March 2016, United States Secretary of State John Kerry declared that the violence initiated by IS against the Yezidis and others amounted to genocide.
- United Kingdom: On 20 April 2016, the House of Commons of the United Kingdom unanimously supported a motion to declare that the treatment of Yezidis and Christians by the Islamic State amounted to genocide, to condemn it as such, and to refer the issue to the UN Security Council. In doing so, Conservative MPs defied their own party's government, who had tried to dissuade them from making such a statement, because of the Foreign Office legal department's long-standing policy (dating back to the 1948 passing of the Genocide Convention) of refusing to give a legal description to potential war crimes. Foreign Office secretary Tobias Ellwood – who was jeered at and interrupted by MPs during his speech in the debate – stated that he personally believed genocide had taken place, but that it was not up to politicians to make that determination, but to the courts. Furthermore, on 23 March 2017, the regional devolved Scottish Parliament adopted a motion stating: '[The Scottish Parliament] recognises and condemns the genocide perpetrated against the Yezidi people by Daesh [IS]; acknowledges the great human suffering and loss that have been inflicted by bigotry, brutality and religious intolerance, [and] further acknowledges and condemns the crimes perpetrated by Daesh against Muslims, Christians, Arabs, Kurds and all of the religious and ethnic communities of Iraq and Syria; welcomes the actions of the US Congress, the European Parliament, the French Senate, the UN and others in formally recognising the genocide'.
- Canada: On 25 October 2016, the House of Commons of Canada unanimously supported a motion tabled by MP Michelle Rempel Garner (CPC) to recognise that IS was committing genocide against the Yezidi people, to acknowledge that IS still kept many Yezidi women and girls captive as sex slaves, to support and take action on a recent UN commission report, and provide asylum to Yezidi women and girls within 120 days.
- France: On 6 December 2016, the French Senate unanimously approved a resolution stating that acts committed by the Islamic State against "the Christian and Yazidi populations, other minorities and civilians" were "war crimes", "crimes against humanity", and constituted a "genocide". It also invited the government to "use all legal channels" to have these crimes recognised, and the perpetrators tried. The National Assembly adopted a similar resolution two days later (originally tabled on 25 May 2016 by Yves Fromion of The Republicans), with the Socialist, Ecologist and Republican group abstaining and the other groups approving.
- Armenia: In January 2018, the Armenian parliament recognised and condemned the 2014 genocide of Yezidis by the Islamic State, and called on the international community to conduct an international investigation into the events.
- Israel: On 21 November 2018, a bill tabled by opposition MP Ksenia Svetlova (ZU) to recognise the Islamic State's killing of Yazidis as a genocide was defeated in a 58 to 38 vote in the Knesset. The coalition parties motivated their rejection of the bill by saying that the United Nations had not yet recognised it as a genocide.
- Iraq: On 1 March 2021, the Iraq parliament passed the Yezidi [Female] Survivors Bill which provides assistance to survivors and "determines the atrocities perpetrated by Daesh against the Yazidis, Turkmen, Christians and Shabaks to be genocide and crimes against humanity." The law provides compensation, measures for rehabilitation and reintegration, pensions, provision of land, housing, and education, and a quota in public sector employment. On 10 May 2021, the United Nations Investigative Team to Promote Accountability for Crimes Committed by Da'esh/IS (UNITAD) determined that ISIL's actions in Iraq constituted genocide.
- Belgium: On 30 June 2021, the Foreign Relations Commission of the Belgian Chamber of Representatives unanimously approved a resolution by opposition representatives Georges Dallemagne (cdH) and Koen Metsu (N-VA) to recognise IS's August 2014 massacre of thousands of Yezidi men and enslavement of thousands of Yezidi women and children as genocide. The resolution, which would likely also pass with overwhelming approval in the Chamber itself, called on the Belgian government to increase its efforts to support victims, and prosecute perpetrators (either at the International Criminal Court, or at a new ad hoc tribunal). On 17 July 2021, the Belgian parliament unanimously voted to recognize the suffering of the Yazidis at the hands of the Islamic State (IS) in 2014 as a genocide.
- Netherlands: On 6 July 2021, the Dutch House of Representatives unanimously passed a motion tabled by MP Anne Kuik (CDA) which recognised the crimes of Islamic State against the Yezidi population as a genocide and crimes against humanity.
- Germany: On 19 January 2023, the German Bundestag unanimously recognized the crimes against Yezidis as genocide. The resolution, which was jointly tabled by the government and the opposition, also calls for prosecution of the perpetrators and aid for rebuilding Yezidi villages.
- Switzerland: On 17 December 2024, the Swiss Parliament officially recognized the crimes by ISIS against Yazidis as genocide.

=== Greek genocide ===
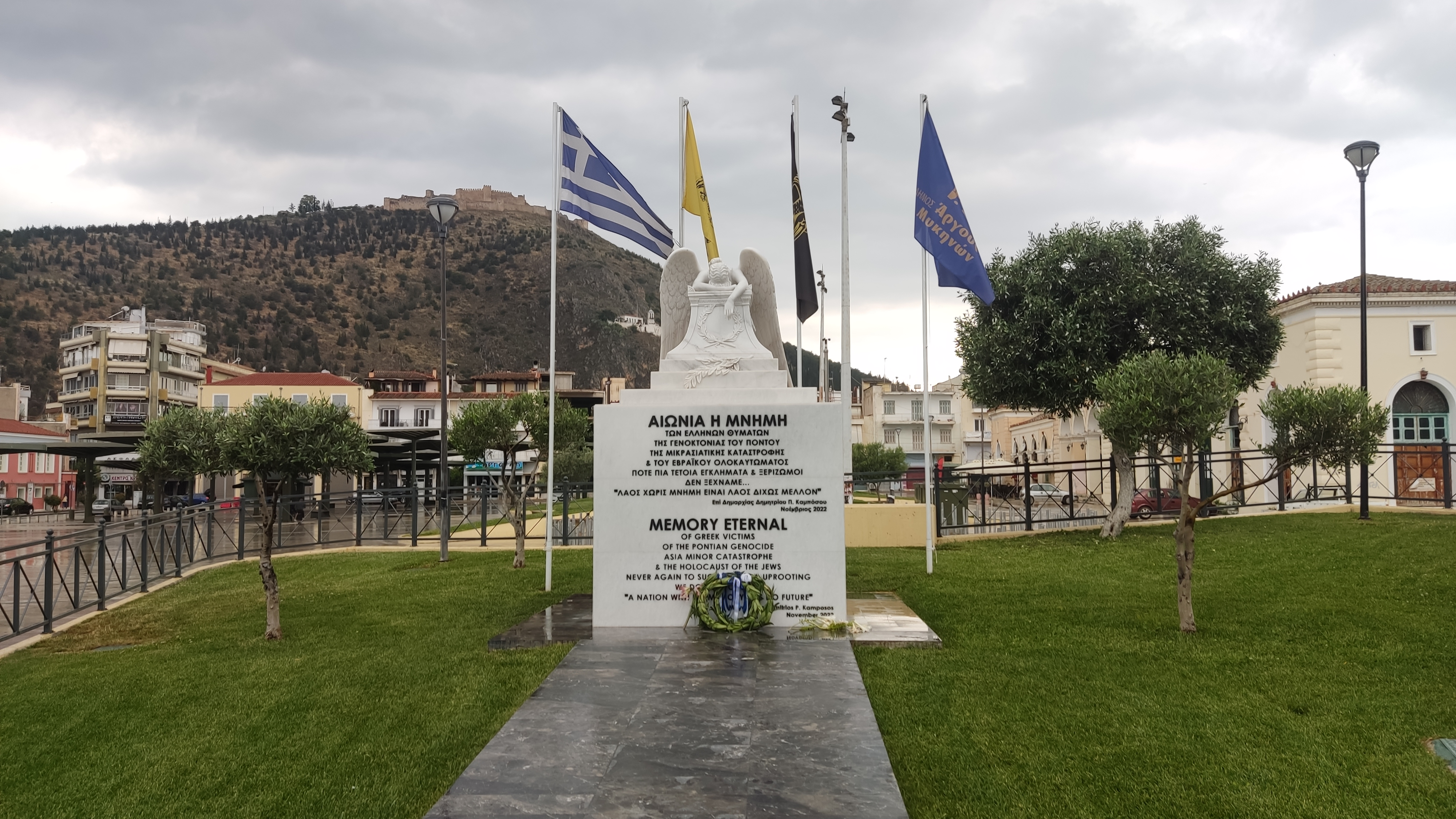
Monument in Argos, Greece for the Greek genocide and the Holocaust

Following an initiative of MPs of the so-called "patriotic" wing of the ruling PASOK party's parliamentary group and like-minded MPs of conservative New Democracy, the Greek Parliament passed two laws on the fate of the Ottoman Greeks; the first in 1994 and the second in 1998. The decrees were published in the Greek Government Gazette on 8 March 1994 and 13 October 1998 respectively. The 1994 decree, created by Georgios Daskalakis, affirmed the genocide in the Pontus region of Asia Minor and designated 19 May (the day Mustafa Kemal landed in Samsun in 1919) a day of commemoration, (called Pontian Greek Genocide Remembrance Day) while the 1998 decree affirmed the genocide of Greeks in Asia Minor as a whole and designated 14 September a day of commemoration. These laws were signed by the President of Greece but were not immediately ratified after political interventions. After leftist newspaper I Avgi initiated a campaign against the application of this law, the subject became subject of a political debate. The president of the left-ecologist Synaspismos party Nikos Konstantopoulos and historian Angelos Elefantis, known for his books on the history of Greek communism, were two of the major figures of the political left who expressed their opposition to the decree. However, the non-parliamentary left-wing nationalist intellectual and author George Karabelias bitterly criticized Elefantis and others opposing the recognition of genocide and called them "revisionist historians", accusing the Greek mainstream left of a "distorted ideological evolution". He said that for the Greek left 19 May is a "day of amnesia".

In the late 2000s the Communist Party of Greece adopted the term "Genocide of the Pontic (Greeks)" (Γενοκτονία Ποντίων) in its official newspaper Rizospastis and participates in memorial events.

The Republic of Cyprus has also officially called the events "Greek Genocide in Pontus of Asia Minor".

In response to the 1998 law, the Turkish government released a statement which claimed that describing the events as genocide was "without any historical basis". "We condemn and protest this resolution" a Turkish Foreign Ministry statement said. "With this resolution the Greek Parliament, which in fact has to apologize to the Turkish people for the large-scale destruction and massacres Greece perpetrated in Anatolia, not only sustains the traditional Greek policy of distorting history, but it also displays that the expansionist Greek mentality is still alive," the statement added.

On 11 March 2010, Sweden's Riksdag passed a motion recognising "as an act of genocide the killing of Armenians, Assyrians/Syriacs/Chaldeans and Pontic Greeks in 1915".

On 14 May 2013, the government of New South Wales was submitted a genocide recognition motion by Fred Nile of the Christian Democratic Party, which was later passed making it the fourth political entity to recognise the genocide.

In March 2015, the National Assembly of Armenia unanimously adopted a resolution recognizing both the Greek and Assyrian genocides.

In April 2015, the States General of the Netherlands and the Austrian Parliament passed resolutions recognizing the Greek and Assyrian genocides.

=== 1888–1893 Uprisings of Hazaras ===
The Hazara diaspora mourns the deaths of the victims of the Hazara uprisings of the 1890s on September 25 (called the "Hazara Black Day") and it wants the International community to recognize the subjugation of the Hazaras as a genocide.

=== Holocaust ===
In the international community, there is a virtually unanimous consensus that in the early 1940s, the Holocaust was primarily committed against the Jews and other minorities by Nazi Germany, due to the existence of an overwhelming amount of evidence, but there are some differences in names and definitions, periodisation, scope (for example, some historians believe that the 1941–44 Romani genocide/Porajmos should be recognised as a part of the Holocaust, however, other historians believe that it should be recognized as a separate genocide which was simultaneously committed with the Holocaust), attributed responsibility, and motivation. There is a wide range of Holocaust memorial days, memorials and museums, and educational policies. Unlike the politics which surrounds other genocides, much of the politics which surrounds the Holocaust is not focused on the formal recognition of it in political statements (since there already is a strong consensus with regard to it), instead, it is focused on the importance of the Holocaust, which aspects of the Holocaust should be emphasised, how to prevent the Holocaust or similar genocides from happening again, how to combat Holocaust denial, and whether Holocaust denial should be legal or illegal. Some regimes, politicians or organisations may occasionally deny or downplay the Holocaust for various reasons, such as antisemitism, opposition to the existence of the State of Israel, or a desire to compare the Holocaust to other genocides because they consider the importance of those genocides either similar to or greater than the importance of the Holocaust.

=== Holodomor ===
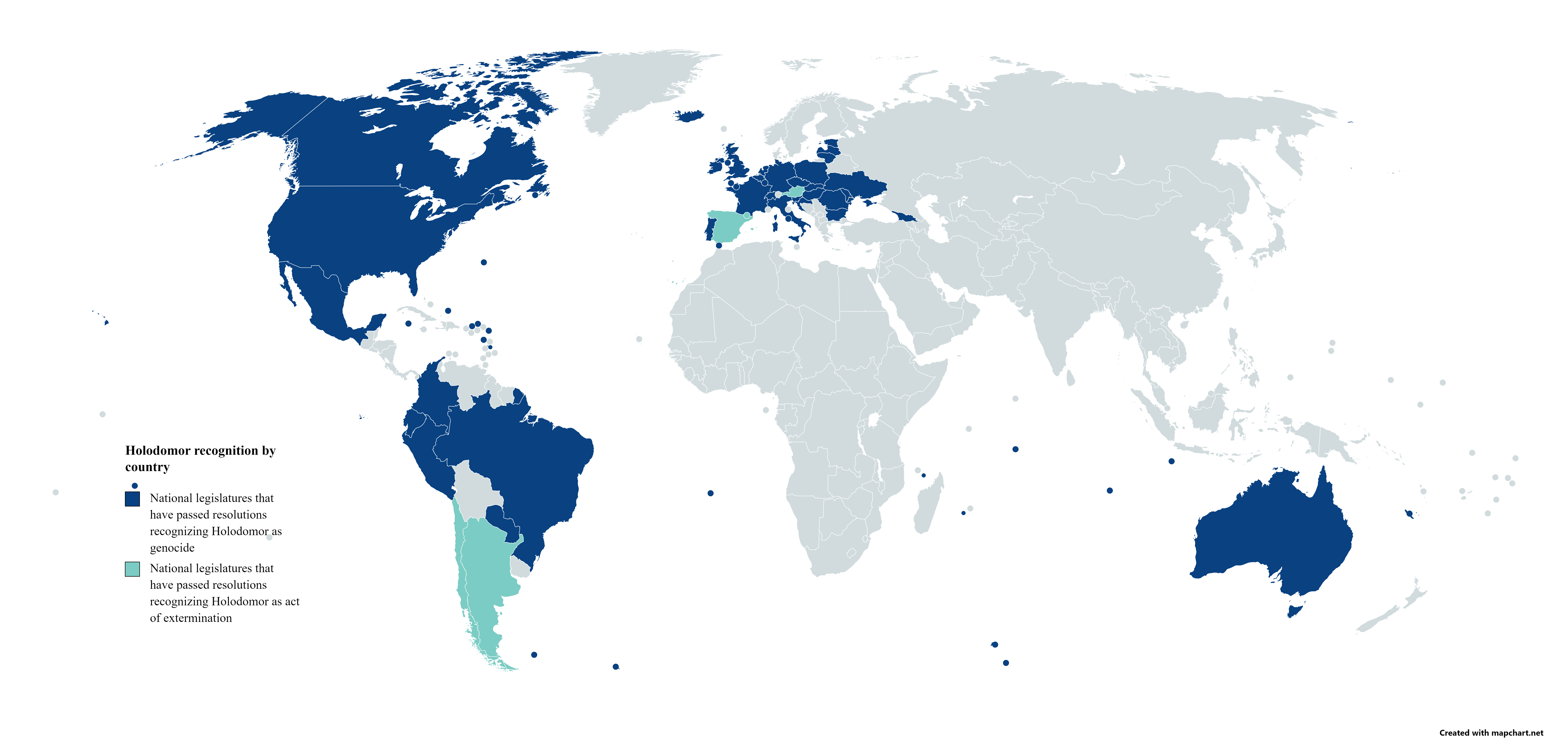
Recognition of the Holodomor by country

Ukraine's Ministry of Foreign Affairs has run campaigns and lobbied the United Nations and the Council of Europe to recognise the Holodomor as a genocide internationally. The governments of various countries have issued statements recognizing the Holodomor as genocide including Ukraine since 2006, and 13 other countries as of 2015.

In November 2022, the Belarusian opposition in exile recognised the Holodomor as a genocide, and Pope Francis compared the Russian war in Ukraine with its targeted destruction of civilian infrastructure to the "terrible Holodomor Genocide", during an address at St. Peter's Square. As of January 2026, 34 countries recognise the Holodomor as a genocide.

Countries whose legislatures have passed a resolution recognizing the Holodomor as a genocide:

- Australia, 28 October 1993
- Belgium, 10 March 2023
- Bulgaria, 1 February 2023
- Canada, 20 June 2003
- Colombia, 21 December 2007
- Croatia, moved 15 June 2023, approved 28 June 2023
- Czech Republic, 6 April 2022
- Ecuador, 30 October 2007
- Estonia, 20 October 1993
- France, 28 March 2023
- Georgia, 20 December 2005
- Germany, 30 November 2022
- Hungary, 26 November 2003
- Iceland, 22 March 2023
- Italy, 26 July 2023
- Latvia, 13 March 2008
- Lithuania, 24 November 2005
- Luxembourg, 13 June 2023
- Mexico, 19 February 2008
- Moldova, 24 November 2022
- Netherlands, 7 July 2023
- Paraguay, 25 October 2007
- Peru, 19 June 2007
- Poland, 4 December 2006
- Portugal, 2 March 2017
- Romania, 24 November 2022
- Slovakia, 20 June 2023
- Slovenia, 23 May 2023
- Switzerland, 24 September 2024
- Ukraine, 28 November 2006
- United Kingdom, 25 May 2023 (resolution passed by the House of Commons)
  - Wales, 25 October 2023
- United States, 11 December 2018 (resolution passed by the House of Representatives; on 4 October 2018 resolution passed by the Senate)

Countries whose legislatures have partially passed a resolution recognizing the Holodomor as a genocide:

- Brazil, 26 April 2022 (resolution passed by the Federal Senate)
- Ireland, 24 November 2022 (resolution passed by the Seanad)

Countries whose parliamentary factions have issued joint declarations recognizing the Holodomor as a genocide:

- Finland, 24 November 2023 (joint declaration by all parliamentary faction leaders due to the lack of a procedural mechanism for historical resolutions)

Other political bodies whose legislatures have passed a resolution recognizing Holodomor as a genocide:

- European Union, 15 December 2022
- Council of Europe, 12 October 2023
- Chechen Republic of Ichkeria (government in exile), 26 November 2022

Other countries that have issued official documents describing the Holodomor as genocide:

- Vatican City, 2 April 2004

Many countries have signed declarations in statements at the United Nations General Assembly affirming that the Holodomor was as a "national tragedy of the Ukrainian people" caused by the "cruel actions and policies of the totalitarian regime". (Note: See the United Nations for a list of resolutions with references.) Similar statements were passed as resolutions by international organizations (Note: See United Nations section for details and references.) such as the European Parliament, (Note: See European Parliament section for text and references for European Parliament resolution of 23 October 2008 on the commemoration of the Holodomor, the Ukraine artificial famine.) the Parliamentary Assembly of the Council of Europe (PACE), (Note: See Council of Europe for details and references.) the Organization for Security and Cooperation in Europe (OSCE), and the United Nations Organization for Education, Science and Culture (UNESCO).

Countries to have signed declarations for the United Nations on the Holodomor (Note: For details on recognition, see National recognition.) (Note: Referenced are a list of nations which were co-author sponsors of the United Nations Declaration on 85th anniversary of Holodomor.) include Albania, (Note: Nation has signed the United Nations Declaration on the Eighty-Fifth Anniversary of the Holodomor of 1932-1933 in Ukraine.) Argentina, Australia, Austria, Azerbaijan, Belgium, Bulgaria, Canada, Chile, Colombia, Czechia, Croatia, Denmark, Ecuador, Estonia, Finland, France, Georgia, Hungary, Iceland, Ireland, Israel, Latvia, Liechtenstein, Lithuania, Luxembourg, Mexico, Moldova, Monaco, Montenegro, Paraguay, Peru, Poland, Portugal, Slovakia, Spain, Ukraine, and the United States.

=== Romani genocide ===
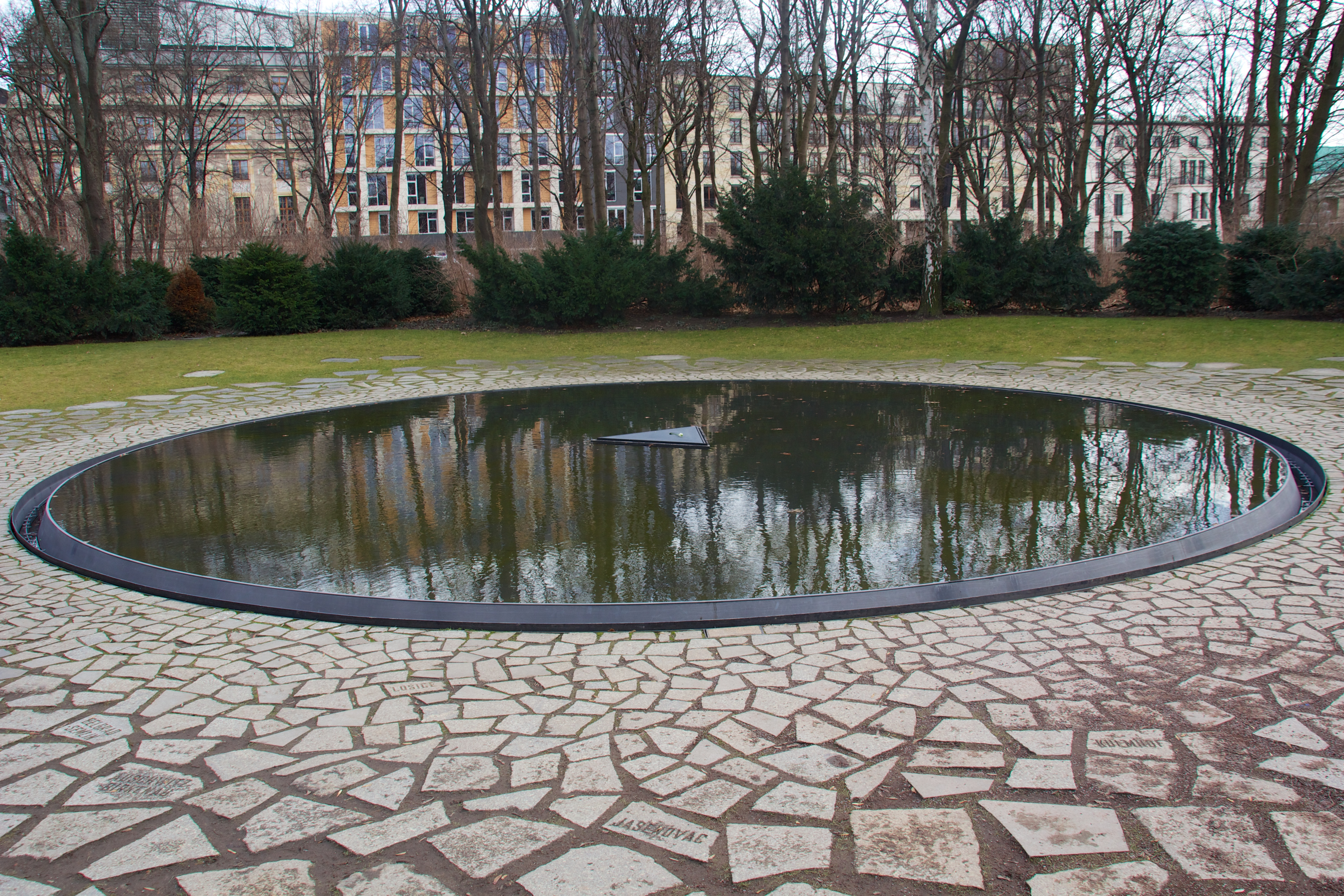
Memorial to the Sinti and Roma Victims of the Nazis in Berlin, Germany

The German government paid war reparations to Jewish survivors of the Holocaust, but not to the Romani. There were "never any consultations at Nuremberg or any other international conference as to whether the Sinti and Roma were entitled like the Jews to reparations." The Interior Ministry of Wuerttemberg argued that "Gypsies [were] persecuted under the Nazis not for any racial reason but because of an asocial and criminal record". When on trial for his leadership of Einsatzgruppen in the USSR, Otto Ohlendorf cited the massacres of Roma people during the Thirty Years' War as a historical precedent.

The European Roma Rights Centre in 2017 gave more details of the chronology of recognition and reparations:

After World War II Roma were also excluded from the right to restitution, because Federal German authorities denied that Roma were persecued due to racist reasons. After a small step in this direction in 1963, restitutions became possible in small amounts only in 1979, when the West German Federal Parliament declared that the Nazi persecution of Roma was based on racial grounds and Roma survivors were allowed to claim for restitution in a form of a onetime payment. The official acceptance of the Porajmos as genocide by the Federal Republic of Germany followed only in 1982 with a speech by Chancelor Helmut Schmidt. In August 2016, an agreement between the German Ministry for Finance and the Foreign Ministry of the Czech Republic decided on compensation for survivors of the Porajmos in the Czech Republic. This agreement, which will give 2,500 EUR to each of the handful of survivors, was greeted as a symbolic acknowledgment, but also criticised for its delay and the low amount awarded. However, this agreement has already led to renewed claims from Romani victims from the former Yugoslavia and other regions of 'romocide'.

In the historiography of East Germany (GDR), the persecution of Sinti and Roma under National Socialism was largely taboo. The German historian Anne-Kathleen Tillack-Graf states that in the GDR, Sinti and Roma were not mentioned as concentration camp prisoners during the official commemorations of the liberation at the three national memorial sites Buchenwald, Sachsenhausen, and Ravensbrück, just like homosexuals, Jehovah's Witnesses and asocial detainees. West Germany recognised the genocide of the Roma in 1982, and since then the Porajmos has been increasingly recognized as a genocide committed simultaneously with the Shoah. The American historian Sybil Milton wrote several articles arguing that the Porajmos deserved recognition as part of the Holocaust. In Switzerland, a committee of experts investigated the policy of the Swiss government during the Porajmos.

Nico Fortuna, a sociologist and Roma activist, explained the distinction between Jewish collective memory of the Holocaust and the Roma experience:

There is a difference between the Jewish and Roma deportees ... The Jews were shocked and can remember the year, date and time it happened. The Roma shrugged it off. They said, "Of course I was deported. I'm Roma; these things happen to a Roma." The Roma mentality is different from the Jewish mentality. For example, a Roma came to me and asked, "Why do you care so much about these deportations? Your family was not deported." I went, "I care as a Roma" and the guy said back, "I do not care because my family were brave, proud Roma that were not deported."
For the Jews it was total and everyone knew this—from bankers to pawnbrokers. For the Roma it was selective and not comprehensive. The Roma were only exterminated in a few parts of Europe such as Poland, the Netherlands, Germany and France. In Romania and much of the Balkans, only nomadic Roma and social outcast Roma were deported. This matters and influences the Roma mentality.

Ian Hancock has also observed a reluctance among Roma to acknowledge their victimization by the Third Reich. The Roma "are traditionally not disposed to keeping alive the terrible memories from their history—nostalgia is a luxury for others". The effects of the illiteracy, the lack of social institutions, and the rampant discrimination faced by Roma in Europe today have produced a people who, according to Fortuna, lack a "national consciousness ... and historical memory of the Holocaust because there is no Roma elite."

=== Persecution of Uyghurs in China ===
In April 2019, Cornell University anthropologist Magnus Fiskesjö wrote in Inside Higher Ed that mass arrests of ethnic minority academics and intellectuals in Xinjiang indicated that "the Chinese regime's current campaign against the native Uighur, Kazakh and other peoples is already a genocide." Later, in 2020, Fiskejö wrote in academic journal Monde Chinois that "[t]he evidence for genocide is thus already massive, and must, at the very least, be regarded as sufficient for prosecution under international law... the number of competent authorities around the world concurring that this is indeed genocide are increasing."

In June 2020, after an Associated Press investigation found that Uyghurs were being subjected to mass forced sterilizations and forced abortions in Xinjiang, scholars increasingly have referred to the abuses in Xinjiang as a genocide.

In July 2020, Zenz said an interview with National Public Radio (NPR) that he had previously argued that the actions of the Chinese government are a cultural genocide, not a "literal genocide", but that one of the five criteria from the Genocide Convention was satisfied by more recent developments concerning the suppression of birth rates so "we do need to probably call it a genocide". The same month, law professor Ryszard Piotrowicz likewise wrote that the sterilization of Uyghur women and children constituted genocide under the 1948 Convention. Chris Patten, the last colonial governor of British Hong Kong, said that the "birth control campaign" was "arguably something that comes within the terms of the UN views on sorts of genocide".

Although China is not a member of the International Criminal Court, on 6 July 2020 the self-proclaimed East Turkistan Government-in-Exile and the East Turkistan National Awakening Movement filed a complaint with the ICC calling for it to investigate Chinese officials for crimes against Uyghurs including allegations of genocide. The ICC responded in December 2020 and "asked for more evidence before it will be willing to open an investigation into claims of genocide against Uighur people by China, but has said it will keep the file open for such further evidence to be submitted."

An August 2020 Quartz article reported that some scholars hesitate to label the human rights abuses in Xinjiang as a "full-blown genocide", preferring the term "cultural genocide", but that increasingly many experts were calling them "crimes against humanity" or "genocide". In August 2020 the spokesperson for Joe Biden's presidential campaign described China's actions as genocide.

In October 2020, the U.S. Senate introduced a bipartisan resolution designating the human rights abuses perpetrated by the Chinese government against the Uyghur people and other ethnic minorities in Xinjiang as genocide. Around the same time, the House of Commons of Canada issued a statement that its Subcommittee on International Human Rights of the Standing Committee on Foreign Affairs and International Development was persuaded that the Chinese Communist Party's actions in Xinjiang constitute genocide as laid out in the Genocide Convention. The 2020 annual report by the Congressional-Executive Commission on China referred to the Chinese government's treatment of Uyghurs as "crimes against humanity and possibly genocide."

In January 2021, U.S. secretary of state Mike Pompeo officially declared that China was committing genocide against the Uyghurs and other ethnic minorities living in Xinjiang. This declaration, which came in the final hours of the Trump administration, had not been made earlier due to a worry that it could disrupt trade talks between the US and China. On the allegations of crimes against humanity, which Pompeo asserted were ongoing and included the "arbitrary imprisonment or other severe deprivation of physical liberty of more than one million civilians, forced sterilization, torture of a large number of those arbitrarily detained, forced labor and the imposition of draconian restrictions on freedom of religion or belief, freedom of expression and freedom of movement."

On 19 January 2021, incoming U.S. president Joe Biden's secretary of state nominee Antony Blinken was asked during his confirmation hearings whether he agreed with Pompeo's conclusion that the CCP had committed genocide against the Uyghurs, he contended "That would be my judgment as well." During her confirmation hearings Joe Biden's nominee to be the US ambassador to the United Nations Linda Thomas-Greenfield stated that she believed what was currently happening in Xinjiang was a genocide, adding "I lived through and experienced and witnessed a genocide in Rwanda."

The US designation was followed by Canada's House of Commons and the Dutch parliament, each passing a non-binding motion in February 2021 to recognize China's actions as genocide.

In January 2021, the United States Holocaust Memorial Museum initially stated that, "[t]here is a reasonable basis to believe that the government of China is committing crimes against humanity." In November 2021, the museum revised its stance, stating the "Chinese government may be committing genocide against the Uyghurs."

In February 2021, a legal opinion released by the Essex Court Chambers concluded that "there is a very credible case that acts carried out by the Chinese government against the Uighur people in Xinjiang Uighur Autonomous Region amount to crimes against humanity and the crime of genocide, and describes how the minority group has been subject to "enslavement, torture, rape, enforced sterilisation and persecution." "Victims have been "forced to remain in stress positions for an extended period of time, beaten, deprived of food, shackled and blindfolded", it said. The legal team stated that they had seen "prolific credible evidence" of sterilisation procedures carried out on women, including forced abortions, saying the human rights abuses "clearly constitute a form of genocidal conduct". The opinion identified three Chinese officials – President Xi, Chen Quanguo and Zhu Hailun – with whom the authors believed there was a "plausible" case that personal responsibility for the genocide lay.

On 13 February 2021, The Economist wrote that while China's treatment and persecution of Uyghurs is "horrific" and a crime against humanity, "genocide" is the wrong word for China's actions due to China not engaging in mass murder.

According to a March 2021 New Lines Institute report that was written by over 50 global China, genocide, and international law experts, the Chinese government breached every article in the Genocide Convention, writing, "China's long-established, publicly and repeatedly declared, specifically targeted, systematically implemented, and fully resourced policy and practice toward the Uyghur group is inseparable from 'the intent to destroy in whole or in part' the Uyghur group as such." The report cited credible reports of mass deaths under the mass internment drive, while Uighur leaders were selectively sentenced to death or long-term imprisonment. "Uyghurs are suffering from systematic torture and cruel, inhumane, and degrading treatment, including rape, sexual abuse, and public humiliation, both inside and outside the camps", the report stated. The report argued that these policies are directly orchestrated by the highest levels of state, including Xi and the top officials of the Chinese Communist Party in Xinjiang. It also reported that the Chinese government gave explicit orders to "eradicate tumours", "wipe them out completely", "destroy them root and branch", "round up everyone", and "show absolutely no mercy", in regards to Uyghurs, and that camp guards reportedly follow orders to uphold the system in place until "Kazakhs, Uyghurs, and other Muslim nationalities, would disappear...until all Muslim nationalities would be extinct". According to the report "Internment camps contain designated "interrogation rooms" where Uyghur detainees are subjected to consistent and brutal torture methods, including beatings with metal prods, electric shocks, and whips."

In April 2021, Human Rights Watch released a report labelling human rights abuses against Uyghurs in Xinjiang as crimes against humanity. While acknowledging the genocide determinations made by various countries, they also mentioned that they had "not documented the existence of the necessary genocidal intent at this time" but that "nothing in this report precludes such a finding and, if such evidence were to emerge, the acts being committed against Turkic Muslims in Xinjiang—a group protected by the 1948 Genocide Convention—could also support a finding of genocide.".

In June 2021, the Canadian Anthropology Society issued a statement on Xinjiang in which the organization stated, "expert testimony and witnessing, and irrefutable evidence from the Chinese Government's own satellite imagery, documents, and eyewitness reports, overwhelmingly confirms the scale of the genocide."

In June 2021, The New York Times and ProPublica published their analysis of over 3,000 videos, concluding that after the January 2021 U.S. declaration that China was committing genocide in Xinjiang, the Chinese government started an influence campaign featuring thousands of videos of Chinese citizens denying genocide and abuses in Xinjiang on Twitter and YouTube. In August 2022, the U.S. State Department published a report PRC Efforts to Manipulate Global Public Opinion on Xinjiang on the Chinese government's global efforts "to discredit independent sources that report ongoing genocide and crimes against humanity" in Xinjiang.

In an article for Ethnic and Racial Studies, David Tobin characterized China's actions as a "genocide by attrition". He wrote that China's actions against the Uyghurs, including sexual abuse, mass internment and physical and mental torture, were calculated to destroy "the foundations of [Uyghur] life, language, religion, and inter-generational cultural transmission, resolving the “ethnic problem” through social death of Turkic Muslims".

The Uyghur Tribunal, a "people's tribunal" based in the United Kingdom, began to hold hearings in June 2021 to examine evidence in order to evaluate whether China's abuses against Uyghurs constitute genocide under the Genocide Convention. The tribunal was chaired by Geoffrey Nice, the lead prosecutor in the trial of Slobodan Milošević and chair of the previous China Tribunal, who announced the creation of the tribunal in September 2020. On 9 December 2021, the tribunal concluded that China has committed genocide against the Uyghurs via birth control and sterilization measures. The tribunal also found evidence of crimes against humanity, torture and sexual abuse. The tribunal's final determination does not legally bind any government to take action.

Academics Steve Tsang and Olivia Cheung wrote that their research found no evidence that Xi Jinping advocates genocide against Uyghurs. Tsang and Cheung conclude that China's policies subordinate identity based on culture, religion, or minority language in an effort to establish a national identity based on Han heritage, language, and Xi Jinping Thought.

== See also ==
- Allegations of genocide in Donbas
- Allegations of genocide of Ukrainians in the Russo-Ukrainian War
- Anti-communist mass killings
- Armenian genocide denial, a form of genocide denial
- The Black Book of Communism
- Black genocide in the United States – the belief that African Americans have been subjected to genocide because of racism against them, an aspect of racism in the United States
- Crimes against humanity under communist regimes
- Criticism of communist party rule
- Denial of genocides of Indigenous peoples, another form of genocide denial
- Genocide of indigenous peoples
- Genocides in history
- Historical negationism
- Historical revisionism
- Holocaust studies, a form of genocide studies
- Holocaust trivialization
- List of ethnic cleansing campaigns
- List of genocides
- List of war crimes
- Mass killings under communist regimes
- Native American genocide in the United States – the belief that Native Americans have been subjected to genocide because of racism against them, another aspect of racism in the United States
- Palestinian genocide accusation
- Rohingya genocide case
- Rwandan genocide
