= List of permanent representatives of the Democratic Republic of the Congo to the United Nations =

Permanent Representative of the Democratic Republic of the Congo to the United Nations
- Coat of arms of the DRC
- Incumbent; Zenon Mukongo Ngay since 13 January 2022
- Style: Excellency
- Appointer: President of the DRC
- Term length: At the pleasure of the president
- Inaugural holder: Thomas Kanza
- Formation: 1960; 66 years ago
- Website: https://www.un.int/drcongo/

The permanent representative of the Democratic Republic of the Congo to the United Nations is the Democratic Republic of the Congo's foremost diplomatic representative to the United Nations, and in charge of the Democratic Republic of the Congo Mission to the United Nations (DRC-MIS). DRC permanent representatives to the UN hold the personal rank of ambassador. The full official title and style is His Excellency Permanent Representative from the Democratic Republic of the Congo to the United Nations.

== Permanent representatives to the United Nations ==
#	Officeholder	Image	Term start date	Time in office	Notes
Independence from Belgium in 30 June 1960
1	Thomas Kanza		20 September 1960	0 years	
Republic of Zaire from 27 October 1971
2	Bagbeni Adeito Nzengeya		1989		
Democratic Republic of the Congo from 16 May 1997
3	André Mwamba Kapanga		11 September 1997	3 years	
4	Christian Atoki Ileka		23 May 2001	11 years	
5	Ignace Gata Mavita wa Lufuta		05 September 2012	9 years	
6	Georges Nzongola-Ntalaja		13 January 2022	0 years	
7	Zenon Mukongo Ngay		9 January 2023	0 years	
