= Raymond Ramazani Baya =

Congolese politician (1943–2019)

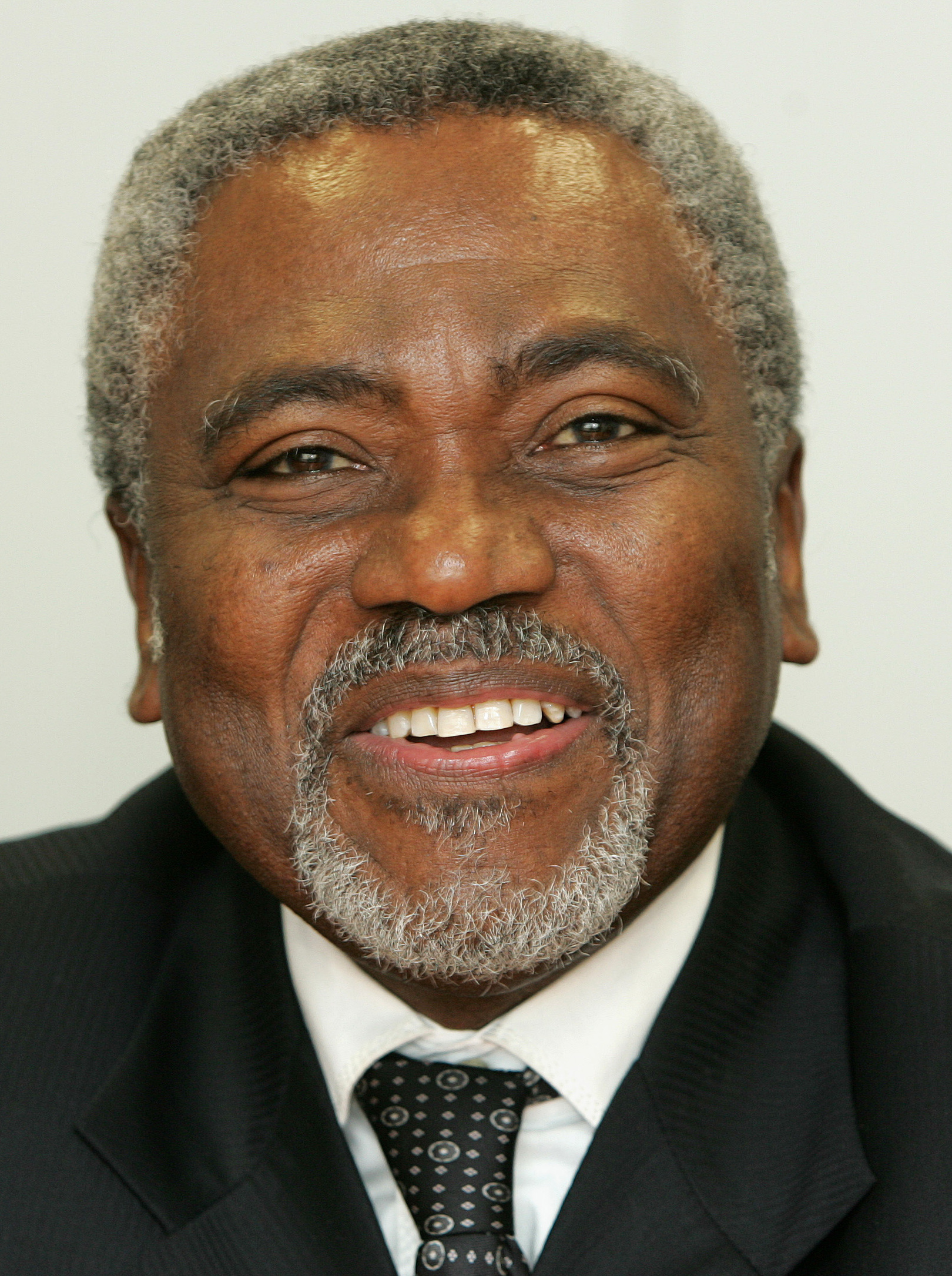
- Ramazani Baya in 2005

Foreign Minister of the Democratic Republic of the Congo
- In office 22 July 2004 – 6 February 2007
- President: Joseph Kabila
- Preceded by: Antoine Ghonda
- Succeeded by: Antipas Mbusa

Ambassador of Zaire to France
- In office 1990–1996

Personal details
- Born: 16 June 1943 Beni, Belgian Congo
- Died: 1 January 2019 (aged 75) Paris, France

Raymond Ramazani Baya (16 June 1943 – 1 January 2019) was a Congolese politician. He served as the foreign minister of that country under the transitional government following his appointment to that post on 23 July 2004, by vice-president Jean-Pierre Bemba, who was allowed to appoint the foreign minister.

== Biography ==
Ramazani was a long-time member of the regime of President Mobutu, most prominently as Minister of Information and as Ambassador to France.

On 23 November 1996, Ramazani was staying in a hotel in Nice, not far from Mobutu's Villa del Mare in Roquebrune Cap-Martin when he was summoned by Mobutu to assist at a meeting with Central African President Ange-Félix Patassé. In Menton, he hit two adolescents with his car while driving well above the speed limit. One victim immediately died, whereas the other went in a coma and died shortly thereafter. He quit his position as ambassador, and was condemned to a suspended sentence of two years in prison and a fine of 56,000 FF.

After the fall of Mobutu in 1997, Ramazani became dissatisfied with the new government of Laurent Kabila. He joined the Movement for the Liberation of Congo, a rebel group based in Gbadolite which was led by Jean-Pierre Bemba. In 2003 the group entered into a transitional government with other rebel groups and the Joseph Kabila government. Bemba became a vice-president and, among other things, was able to appoint the foreign minister. Antoine Ghonda became foreign minister, but Ramazani was by this time an important advisor on diplomacy to Bemba. He became foreign minister in 2004 when Ghonda was sacked. His time in that post ended in February 2007, at the beginning of President Joseph Kabila's second term, when the government of Prime Minister Antoine Gizenga took office. He died on 1 January 2019.
