= List of ambassadors of the Democratic Republic of the Congo to France =

Ambassador of Democratic Republic of the Congo to France
- Incumbent none since December 29, 2022

The Congolese ambassador in France is the official representative of the Government of the Democratic Republic of the Congo to the Government of France.

== List of representatives ==
Start	End	Ambassador	Title other than Ambassador	List of heads of state of the Democratic Republic of the Congo	List of heads of state of France	Other remarks
July 25, 1966	July 3, 1969	Joseph Mbeka		Mobutu Sese Seko	Charles de Gaulle; Alain Poher; Georges Pompidou	
July 3, 1969	September 12, 1971	André Mandi		Mobutu Sese Seko	Georges Pompidou	
September 12, 1971	November 19, 1973	Pierre Ferdinand Bokata W'Ekila		Mobutu Sese Seko	Georges Pompidou	
December 23, 1976	May 10, 1979	Bokonga Ekanga Botombele		Mobutu Sese Seko	Valéry Giscard d'Estaing	
May 10, 1979	October 30, 1980	Kititwa Tumansi		Mobutu Sese Seko	Valéry Giscard d'Estaing	
October 1980	May 11, 1984	Edouard Mokolo wa Mpombo		Mobutu Sese Seko	Valéry Giscard d'Estaing; François Mitterrand	
May 11, 1984	April 26, 1985	François Kimasi Matwiku Basaula		Mobutu Sese Seko	François Mitterrand	
April 26, 1985	June 24, 1987	Sakombi Inongo		Mobutu Sese Seko	François Mitterrand	
June 24, 1987	January 17, 1990	Bokonga Ekanga Botombele		Mobutu Sese Seko	François Mitterrand	
January 17, 1990	January 21, 1997	Raymond Ramazani Baya		Mobutu Sese Seko	François Mitterrand; Jacques Chirac	
October 22, 2001	August 30, 2005	Eddy Angulu		Mobutu Sese Seko	Jacques Chirac	
December 9, 2005	March 24, 2007	Jean-de-Dieu Moleka Liambi		Mobutu Sese Seko	Jacques Chirac	
March 12, 2009	September 15, 2011	Myra Ndjoku Manianga		Mobutu Sese Seko	Nicolas Sarkozy	
November 5, 2011	August 30, 2018	Christian Atoki Ileka		Joseph Kabila	Nicolas Sarkozy; François Hollande	
2021	December 29, 2022	Isabel Machik Tshombe		Félix Tshisekedi	Emmanuel Macron	
August 31, 2023	Incumbent	Émile Ngoy Kasongo}		Félix Tshisekedi	Emmanuel Macron	
