= Georges Nzongola-Ntalaja =

Congolese academic and diplomat (born 1944)

His Excellency Georges Nzongola-Ntalaja FAAS
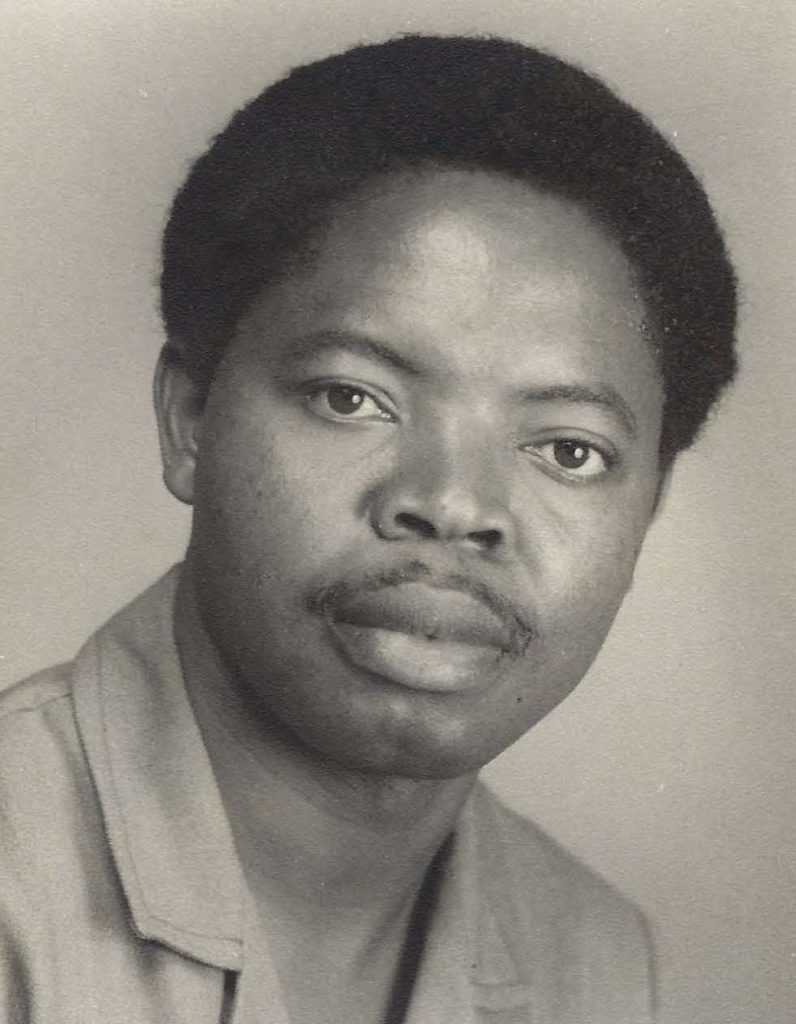
- Nzongola-Ntalaja in 1967

6th DRC Ambassador to the United Nations
- In office 13 January 2022 – 9 January 2023
- Preceded by: Ignace Gata Mavita wa Lufuta
- Succeeded by: Zenon Mukongo Ngay

Personal details
- Born: 3 February 1944 (age 82) Kasha, South Kivu, Belgian Congo
- Education: Davidson College (BA, 1967); University of Kentucky (MA, 1968); University of Wisconsin–Madison (PhD, 1975)
- Awards: Best Book Award from the African Politics Conference Group (2004); Distinguished Africanist Award (2025)
- Scientific career
- Fields: Political science; African studies
- Institutions: University of Kisangani (1970–1971); University of Lubumbashi (1971–1975); Clark-Atlanta University (1975–1977); University of Maiduguri (1977–1978); Howard University (1978–1997); International Political Science Association (1994–1997); African Association of Political Science (1995–1997); African Studies Association (1998); Davidson College (1998–1999); University of North Carolina at Chapel Hill (2007–)

Georges Nzongola-Ntalaja (born 3 February 1944) is a Congolese academic, author, and diplomat. He is a professor of African and Afro-American Studies at the University of North Carolina at Chapel Hill, where he specialises in African and global studies. He was also the Permanent Representative of the Democratic Republic of the Congo to the United Nations from 2022 until 2023.

== Biography ==
Georges Nzongola-Ntalaja was born on 3 February 1944 in Kasha, South Kivu in the Belgian Congo. Nzongola-Ntalaja grew up at an American Presbyterian Congo Mission (APCM) station in Kasha, near the state post of Luputa. Nzongola-Ntalaja's involvement in activism began during his teenage years when he participated in protests that demanded Congolese independence from Belgium.

During the 1960s civil rights movement in the United States, there were calls for Davidson College to admit Black students, and Nzongola-Ntalaja was an exchange student in Minnesota at the time with plans to attend Macalester College. However, Davidson College's president, Grier Martin, contacted his host family and offered him a full scholarship. This made Nzongola-Ntalaja the second Black student to attend Davidson during its early attempts to promote diversity. He quickly became involved in American activism, participating in civil rights movement in the United States, pushing for the college to end discrimination against Black employees, and advocating for a more comprehensive curriculum.

Nzongola-Ntalaja graduated with a Bachelor of Arts degree in philosophy in 1967, before completing a Master of Arts in diplomacy and international commerce in 1968 from the University of Kentucky. He later defended his Doctor of Philosophy in political science in 1975 at the University of Wisconsin–Madison.

=== Academic career ===
Nzongola-Ntalaja had teaching appointments in the University of Kisangani, Congo-Kinshasa from 1970 to 1971, the University of Lubumbashi from 1971 to 1975, Clark-Atlanta University between 1975 and 1977, and the University of Maiduguri in Nigeria between 1977 and 1978. He became a professor of African studies at Howard University between 1978 and 1997, and the James K. Batten Professor of Public Policy at Davidson College, North Carolina, between 1998 and 1999. He was also a visiting professor at El Colegio de Mexico in the summer of 1987. Nzongola-Ntalaja has been a professor in the Department of African-American and Diaspora Studies at the University of North Carolina at Chapel Hill since 2007.

Nzongola-Ntalaja served as President of the African Studies Association (ASA) of the United States in 1988, as a member of the executive committee of the International Political Science Association (IPSA) from 1994 to 1997, and as President of the African Association of Political Science (AAPS) from 1995 to 1997.

Nzongola-Ntalaja has extensive research on African politics, development, and conflict issues, and has authored several books and numerous articles on these topics. One of his most notable works is The Congo from Leopold to Kabila: A People's History, which provides a comprehensive history of the Democratic Republic of the Congo from the colonial period to the present day. The book won the 2004 Best Book Award from the African Politics Conference Group, and was featured on The Guardian's Top 10 books on neocolonialism. He has also written extensively about abuses under the Congo Free State, which he refers to as "the Congo holocaust", and given a TED-Ed talk on the topic. He was elected a Fellow of the African Academy of Sciences in 1988. To honor his life work, the ASA awarded him their Distinguished Africanist Award in 2025.

=== Political career ===
Nzongola-Ntalaja's open opposition to the dictator Mobutu Sese Seko and his regime in Zaire made him a target of intimidation and even death threats. He was subjected to lengthy interrogations by the Security Police. In response, he chose to return to the US and live in voluntary exile for a period of 17 years.

Nzongola-Ntalaja has been a member of the African National Congress (ANC) and the Congolese People's Party for Reconstruction and Democracy (PPRD) since 1991. He has also been a vocal critic of authoritarianism and corruption in the country, and has called for greater democracy and human rights protections in the Congo.

Nzongola-Ntalaja has been involved in politics and contributed to his country's shift away from Mobutu's authoritarian rule. In 1992, he participated as a representative in the Sovereign National Conference of Congo/Zaire, followed by serving as a Diplomatic Advisor to the Transitional Government led by Prime Minister Étienne Tshisekedi. Additionally, in 1996, he was appointed as the Deputy President of the National Electoral Commission of the DRC, where he served as the primary representative of the opposition on the commission. Nzongola-Ntalaja has also worked for the United Nations. He was the Director of the Oslo Governance Center from 2002 to 2005. In 2005, he led a team of experts tasked with developing a peace and security framework for the Great Lakes Region.

Nzongola-Ntalaja was the Permanent Representative of the Democratic Republic of the Congo to the United Nations, having presented his credentials to UN Secretary-General António Guterres on 13 January 2022. In June 2022, Nzongola-Ntalaja asked the Security Council to demand an unconditional withdrawal of the M23 from Bunagana and parts of Rutshuru territory in eastern Congo during the United Nations Security Council meeting. The M23 is a rebel group that was defeated by the Congolese Armed Forces and the United Nations in 2013, but reemerged in November 2021. Congolese officials blame neighbouring Rwanda for supporting the M23, while Rwanda denies any links to the group. However, he dismissed Rwandan concerns about the existence of Democratic Forces for the Liberation of Rwanda in DRC. On 26 October 2022, Nzongola-Ntalaja accused Rwanda of occupying the DRC between 1998 and 2003 and committing atrocities, including plundering the Congolese economy and stealing chimpanzees and other animals. On 9 January 2023, Nzongola-Ntalaja was replaced by Zenon Mukongo Ngay.

== Books ==
- Nzongola-Ntalaja, Georges; Magubane, Bernard Makhosezwe, eds. (1983). Proletarianization and class struggle in Africa. Contemporary Marxism series. San Francisco: Synthesis Publications. ISBN 978-0-89935-019-6.
- Nzongola-Ntalaja, Georges (1986). The Crisis in Zaire: Myths and Realities. Africa World Press. ISBN 978-0-86543-023-5.
- Nzongola-Ntalaja, Georges (1987). Revolution and counter-revolution in Africa : essays in contemporary politics. London: Institute for African Alternatives. ISBN 0-86232-750-4. OCLC 17622087.
- Nzongola-Ntalaja, Georges (1991). Conflict in the Horn of Africa. African Studies Association Press. ISBN 978-0-918456-65-6.
- Nzongola-Ntalaja, Georges (1993). Nation-building and state building in Africa. Occasional paper series. SAPES Trust. Harare: SAPES Books. ISBN 978-1-77905-012-0.
- Krieger, Joel; Joseph, William A.; Paul, James A.; Nzongola-Ntalaja, Georges (1993). The Oxford Companion to Politics of the World. Oxford University Press. ISBN 978-0-19-505934-2.
- Nzongola-Ntalaja, Georges (1997). Le mouvement démocratique au Zaïre, 1956-1996 (in French). UNAM. ISBN 978-968-36-5693-3.
- Science, African Association of Political (1998). The State and Democracy in Africa. Africa World Press. ISBN 978-0-86543-638-1.
- Nzongola-Ntalaja, Georges (2001). Africa in the New Millennium. Nordic Africa Institute. ISBN 978-91-7106-488-2.
- Nzongola-Ntalaja, Georges (2004). From Zaire to the Democratic Republic of the Congo. Nordic Africa Institute. ISBN 978-91-7106-538-4.
- Nzongola-Ntalaja, Georges (22 September 2006). "The history of democracy in DR Congo". Soundings. 34 (34): 131–146. doi:10.3898/136266206820466002.
- Nzongola-Ntalaja, Georges (10 October 2013). The Congo from Leopold to Kabila: A People's History. Bloomsbury Publishing. ISBN 978-1-78032-939-0.
- Nzongola-Ntalaja, Georges (2014). Patrice Lumumba. Ohio University Press. ISBN 9780821445068.

Diplomatic posts
| Preceded by Ignace Gata Mavita wa Lufuta | Permanent Representative of the Democratic Republic of the Congo to the United Nations; 2022–2023 | Succeeded by Zenon Mukongo Ngay |
