= Ignace Gata Mavita wa Lufuta =

Congolese diplomat (born 1949)

Ignace Gata Mavita wa Lufuta (born 7 January 1949, Popokabaka, Belgian Congo) is a Congolese diplomat who served as the Permanent Representative of the Democratic Republic of the Congo to the United Nations (2012-2022). He is the former Vice Minister of Foreign Affairs (2007–2012), and Minister for Regional Integration (2007).

== Biography ==
He was born in 1949, when the country was still a colony of Belgium, in what is now the Kwango province of the DRC. Gava Mavita holds degrees in politics, law and philosophy from the National University of Zaire and a degree in public administration from Charleroi University Center in Belgium. From 1997 to 2001 he was a member of the tripartite commission between DR Congo, Republic of the Congo, and Angola. He later worked in various other ministries in different capacities from 2002 until 2007, when he became minister of regional integration. Later that year Gava Mavita was appointed vice foreign minister, which he held for several years. From 2012 to 2022, he was the Permanent Representative of the DRC to the United Nations.

Diplomatic posts
| Preceded by Christian Atoki Ileka | Permanent Representative of the Democratic Republic of the Congo to the United Nations; 2012–2022 | Succeeded by Georges Nzongola-Ntalaja |
