= Dominique Sakombi Inongo =

Congolese politician

- Dominique Sakombi Inongo during an interview for the Thierry Michel documentary Mobutu, King of Zaire

Minister of Information of Zaire
- President: Mobutu Sese Seko

Personal details
- Born: 18 August 1940 Léopoldville, Belgian Congo
- Died: 28 September 2010 (aged 70) Kinshasa, Democratic Republic of the Congo
- Party: Popular Movement of the Revolution
- Spouse: Nicky Kandolo
- Education: Free University of Brussels

Dominique Sakombi Inongo (18 August 1940 – 28 September 2010) was a Congolese politician and diplomat.

== Early life and career ==
Born in the Belgian Congo's capital Léopoldville, Sakombi was a Lingombe speaker with family roots in Equateur Province. His father was a fisherman. After going to school by the Scheut fathers, Dominique Sakombi studied at Louvain and at the Free University of Brussels from 1961 to 1965. In 1966, he started his career at the medical faculty at Lovanium University in the independent Congo's capital Kinshasa.

== Political and diplomatic career ==
Sakombi became the Chef de cabinet of the Congolese Minister of Information. He soon rose to the higher political ranks of the country. President Mobutu Sese Seko originated, just like Sakombi, from the Equateur region.

In 1970, Sakombi went on to occupy the ministerial position of information. In that capacity, he was responsible for Mobutist propaganda, including the promotion of Authenticité. In 1972, he additionally became National Secretary for the state-party Mouvement Populaire de la Révolution. Later, he had a stint as Minister of National Orientation from 1973 to 1975.

In the period 1974-1976 and again in 1981, he was a member of the powerful Bureau politique of the MPR. From 1976 to 1978 he was the Regional Commissioner for Kinshasa.

After a second term as Minister of Information from 1983 to 1985, Mobutu appointed Sakombi as an Ambassador to France and UNESCO, based in Paris. He moved to Dakar to become his country's Ambassador to Senegal. In 1988, Sakombi became Minister of Information again, a position he held until 1990, when he breaks with Mobutu.

In 1997, the Mobutu presidency fell and was replaced by the AFDL's Laurent-Désiré Kabila. Zaire was rebaptised into the Democratic Republic of the Congo, and Sakombi soon became an advisor to the country's new president. As the Minister of Information, Sakombi announced the death of Laurent-Désiré Kabila after first declaring he was injured, but alive. He held a post as acting Chairman of the High Authority of Media under Laurent-Désiré's son Joseph Kabila, until he was fired in 2008 for "mismanagement".

In 1999, he appeared in Thierry Michel's documentary Mobutu, King of Zaire.

Dominique Sakombi Inongo died on 28 September 2010, at the Ngaliema Hospital in Kinshasa.

== Family ==
Dominique Sakombi Inongo married once Nicky Kandolo, daughter of politician Damien Kandolo. Their son, Aimé Molendo Sakombi is Land Ministry in President Félix Tshisekedi Government and a close ally in UNC's party of Vital Kamerhe. He later married Germaine Ilunga from Katanga region and their son, Michael Sakombi is an appointed Ambassador and former Mongala Province Governor and member of Former President of DRC Joseph Kabila's party, PPRD Furthermore, he was the brother of Denis Sakombi Ekope, Minister of the Interior.

== Honours ==
- Zaire: National Order of the Leopard (Grand Officer)

== Bibliography ==
- Sakombi Inongo, Dominique (1982). Lettre ouverte à Nguza Karl i Bond. GMI.
- Sakombi Inongo, Dominique (1998). Les combats de Kabila (in French). Editions La voie de Dieu.
