= Christian Atoki Ileka =

Democratic Republic of the Congo diplomat (born 1960)

Christian Atoki Ileka (born 12 September 1960) is a diplomat currently serving as the ambassador of the Democratic Republic of the Congo to South Korea.

== Career ==
Ileka's diplomatic career began in 1985, when he worked as the First Secretary of the embassy of Zaire in Athens, Greece, until 1988. He then served as European Bureau Chief in Zaire's Ministry of Foreign Affairs.

From June 1993 to December 1993, Ileka served as a human rights observer to the International Civil Mission in Haiti (MICIVIH). From May to December 1994, he served as registration official and press officer for the spokesman for the Assistant Special Representative of the Secretary-General before returning to MICIVIH from 1995 to 1999, during which Zaire transitioned to become the Democratic Republic of the Congo. Afterwards, he served as Minister Counselor to the Democratic Republic of the Congo's Permanent Mission to the United Nations until 2001.

From 23 May 2001 to 2011, Ileka served as Permanent Representative of the Democratic Republic of the Congo to the United Nations. From October 2011 to 2017, he served as ambassador of the DRC to France. He was named to that position three weeks after the death of his predecessor Myra Ndjoku.

In 2021, he was appointed chief of staff to Christophe Lutundula.

== Personal life ==
Ileka was born in Kinshasa, of and is Mongo. Ileka attended the Catholic University in Leuven, Belgium. He is married and has five children.

Diplomatic posts
Preceded by Ngwey Ndambo Christophe	Ambassador of the Democratic Republic of the Congo to the Republic of Korea; 2022– ongoing	Succeeded by ongoing

Diplomatic posts
Preceded by Myra Ndjoku	Ambassador of the Democratic Republic of the Congo to the French Republic; 2011– 2018	Succeeded by -

Diplomatic posts
Preceded by André Mwamba Kapanga	Permanent Representative of the Democratic Republic of the Congo to the United Nations; 2001–2011	Succeeded by Ignace Gata Mavita wa Lufuta
