= Kasha, South Kivu =

Periurban area of the city of Bukavu, DR Congo

Kasha
- Location in the Democratic Republic of the Congo
- Country: Democratic Republic of the Congo
- Province: South Kivu
- City: Bukavu

Kasha is a periurban area of the city of Bukavu. It is located northwest of the city center on Lake Kivu. With the advent of the Rally for Congolese Democracy (RCD), Bukavu grew from three to four communes. The commune of Kasha was created from an urban-rural district of the commune of Bagira. In the present day it is no longer a commune.
