= Robert Weisbord =

American historian

- Born: Robert G. Weisbord
- Education: New York University (BA, PhD)
- Occupation: Historian

Robert G. Weisbord is professor emeritus of History at the University of Rhode Island. He has published seven books and numerous articles dealing with issues of racism in sports, the Vatican, and the Holocaust. He taught an Afro-American history course at the University of Rhode Island in 1966 that was the first such offering at a New England state university.

== Biography ==
Weisbord received his BA in history from New York University in 1955 and his PhD in history from New York University in 1966.

In 1993, the Chicago Tribune reported on research conducted by Weisbord and Norbert Hedderich which changed the historical view of boxer Max Schmeling from a Nazi sympathizer to someone who aided Jews. American scholar and author Harry J. Cargas, said Weisbord's book, The Chief Rabbi, The Pope, and The Holocaust, "shows excellent scholarship, and is a valuable contribution to both the Holocaust literature and the literature of Jewish-Catholic relation."

== Publications ==
- The Chief Rabbi, the Pope and the Holocaust: An Era in Vatican-Jewish Relations (New Brunswick: Transaction, 1992), written with Wallace P. Sillanpoa. ISBN 1412807913.
- Israel in the Black American Perspective (Westport, Connecticut: Greenwood Press, 1985), assisted by Richard Kazarian. ISBN 0313240167.
- Genocide?: Birth Control and the Black American (Westport, Connecticut: Greenwood Press and Two Continents, 1975). ISBN 0837180848.
- Ebony Kinship: African, Africans, and the Afro-American (Westport, Connecticut: Greenwood Press, 1973). ISBN 0837164168.
- Bittersweet Encounter: The Afro-American and the American Jew (Westport, Connecticut: Negro University Press, 1970), written with Arthur Stein. ISBN 0805203656.
- African Zion; the attempt to establish a Jewish colony in the East Africa Protectorate, 1903–1905 Jewish Publication Society of America; First edition (1968). ASIN: B00005VBE6.

== Awards ==
- 1987: URI Foundations Scholarly Excellence Award.
- 2007: URI Faculty Sabbatical Fellowship for the project "Black Power and the 1968 Mexico City Olympics".
- 2010: URI Faculty Research Grant for the project “Racial Questions in the Modern Olympics: The Case of South Africa.”
