= Civil Registry and Identification Service of Chile =

Civil Registry and Identification Service
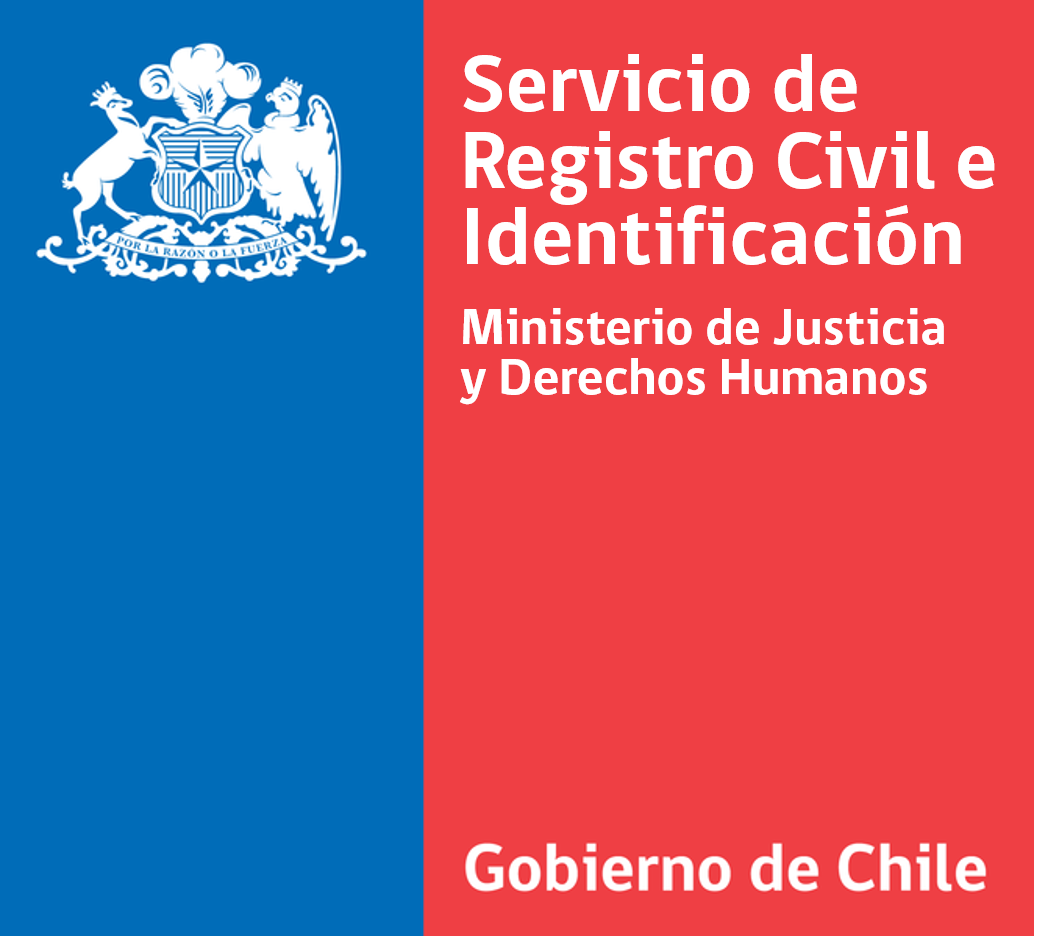
- Government Logo.

Civil registry overview
- Formed: July 17, 1884
- Preceding Civil registry: Civil Registry of Chile (1884-1943)
- Jurisdiction: Chile
- Headquarters: Catedral 1772, Santiago, Chile
- Employees: 3103 (2022)
- Annual budget: 155 860 810 thousand Chilean pesos (2020)
- Civil registry executive: Omar Morales Márquez
- Parent department: Ministry of Justice and Human Rights
- Child Civil registry: See Registers
- Website: https://www.registrocivil.cl/

The Civil Registry and Identification Service (SRCEI), sometimes simply referred to as the Civil Registry, is a decentralized public service in Chile, with its own legal personality and assets, under the supervision of the President of the Republic through the Ministry of Justice and Human Rights. It is responsible for maintaining records related to the civil status of individuals and other duties assigned by law. Since December 2022, the organization has been headed by Omar Morales Márquez, under the government of President Gabriel Boric.

Its tasks include issuing birth certificates, marriage and civil union certificates, death certificates, criminal records, identity cards, passports, Unique Key, vehicle registrations, and inheritance probate for intestate succession.

To carry out its duties, the Civil Registry and Identification Service operates 16 regional offices, 476 offices and sub-offices, 300 self-service kiosks, 95 mobile service units, and a maritime office, known as Civilsur. It employs approximately 3,100 staff members.

== History ==
Since the Colonial Chile era, personal identification was carried out through ecclesiastical records (such as baptismal, marriage, and death certificates) of the Catholic Church, which remained the state religion until 1925. On July 17, 1884, President of the Republic Domingo Santa María enacted the Civil Registry Law, as part of the secular laws, establishing a Civil Registry official responsible for maintaining duplicate records of births, marriages, and deaths.

With the evolving role of the State in economic, social, political, and cultural matters, the Civil Registry had to assume new functions of great importance to society. An example of this is the creation of the "General Registry of Convictions" in 1925, which was linked to identification, to establish the legal individuality of people and record their criminal history.

Decree Law 26, published on November 18, 1924, established the mandatory personal identification service, creating the identity card, which became mandatory for all citizens.

On August 28, 1930, the "Civil Registry Service" was organized, absorbing the tasks of the "Identification and Passport Service" in 1943, which until then had been under the responsibility of the Investigations Police (PDI).

Starting in 1980, the use of computer equipment was introduced, and later, in the 1990s, the incorporation of technology, process redesign, and the acceleration of procedures were promoted, resulting in reduced processing times and a clear orientation towards user satisfaction.

Since then, the adoption of cutting-edge technologies, the establishment of an extensive computer network linking offices, and the development of modern service systems have made the advances of the Service a model to follow for similar institutions in Latin America.

In 2017, the first self-service kiosks of the Civil Registry were inaugurated in high-traffic public locations where certificates are needed, such as town halls and hospitals across Chile, in line with the policies of automation and modernization of the public sector, implementing digital government initiatives.

== Registers ==
The Civil Registry and Identification Service is responsible for the following twenty-two registers:

- Birth Register (1884)
- Marriage Register (1884)
- Death Register (1884)
- General Register of Convictions (1925)
- Identity Card (1943)
- Passport Register (1943)
- Register of Professionals (1981)
- National Register of Motor Vehicles (1985)
- National Register of Motor Vehicle Drivers (1985)
- National Register of the Disability (1994)
- National Register of Domestic Violence (1994)
- Special Register of Offenses related to Drug Consumption and Psychotropic Substances (1995)
- Register of Personal Data Banks managed by Public Bodies (1999)
- National Register of Land Freight Transport (2003)
- National Register of Probate (2003)
- National Register of Wills (2003)
- National DNA Register System (2004)
- National Register of Non-Profit Legal Entities (2011)
- Register of Non-Possessory Pledges (2011)
- Register of persons prohibited from working with minors (2012) (Note: Also known as the "National Offenders Register".)
- National Non-Donors Register (2013)
- Special Register of Civil Union Agreements (2015)
- National Register of Child Support Debtors (2022)

== National Directors ==
| Director | Party | Start | End | President |
|---|---|---|---|---|
| Hernán Díaz Arrieta | Ind. | 1925 | ¿? | Arturo Alessandri Palma |
| | | 1925 | 1927 | Emiliano Figueroa Larraín |
| | | 1927 | 1931 | Carlos Ibáñez del Campo |
| Fernando Jaramillo Valderrama | LP | December 4, 1931 | June 4, 1932 | Juan Esteban Montero |
| Fernando Jaramillo Valderrama | LP | December 24, 1932 | December 24, 1938 | Arturo Alessandri Palma |
| Fernando Jaramillo Valderrama | LP | December 24, 1938 | 1939 | Pedro Aguirre Cerda |
| Luis Felipe Laso Pérez Cotapos | RP | 1939 | November 25, 1941 | Pedro Aguirre Cerda |
| Luis Felipe Laso Pérez Cotapos | RP | November 25, 1941 | April 2, 1942 | Jerónimo Méndez Arancibia |
| Luis Felipe Laso Pérez Cotapos | RP | April 2, 1942 | 1945 | Juan Antonio Ríos |
| Luis Alberto Cuevas Contreras | RP | 1945 | June 27, 1946 | Juan Antonio Ríos |
| Washington Bannen Mujica | RP | June 27, 1946 | 1947 | Gabriel González Videla |
| Desiderio Bravo Ortiz | RP | 1947 | 1952 | Gabriel González Videla |
| Desiderio Bravo Ortiz | RP | November 3, 1952 | 1953 | Carlos Ibáñez del Campo |
| Luis Ignacio Pérez Labra | | 1953 | 1953 | Carlos Ibáñez del Campo |
| Fernando Sergio Montaldo Bustos | Ind. | 1953 | November 3, 1958 | Carlos Ibáñez del Campo |
| Fernando Sergio Montaldo Bustos | Ind. | November 3, 1958 | November 3, 1964 | Jorge Alessandri Rodríguez |
| Fernando Sergio Montaldo Bustos | Ind. | November 3, 1964 | 1965 | Eduardo Frei Montalva |
| Jorge Zapata Santos | PDC | 1965 | November 3, 1970 | Eduardo Frei Montalva |
| Jorge Zapata Santos | PDC | November 3, 1970 | 1971 | Salvador Allende Gossens |
| Heriberto Benquis Camhi | PS | 1971 | September 11, 1973 | Salvador Allende Gossens |
| Desiderio Herrera González | Ind. | September 12, 1973 | 1973 | Augusto Pinochet Ugarte |
| Luis Henríquez Valenzuela | Ind. | 1974 | 1978 | Augusto Pinochet Ugarte |
| José Bernales Pereira | Ind. | 1978 | 1980 | Augusto Pinochet Ugarte |
| Juan Bennett Urrutia | Ind. | February 1980 | June 1982 | Augusto Pinochet Ugarte |
| Luis Larroulet Ganderats | Ind. | 1982 | 1985 | Augusto Pinochet Ugarte |
| Enrique Tornero Figueroa | Ind. | 1985 | 1990 | Augusto Pinochet Ugarte |
| Berta Belmar Ruiz | PDC | March 11, 1990 | March 11, 1994 | Patricio Aylwin Azócar |
| Berta Belmar Ruiz | PDC | March 11, 1994 | 1997 | Eduardo Frei Ruiz-Tagle |
| María Alejandra Sepúlveda Toro | PS | 1997 | March 11, 2000 | Eduardo Frei Ruiz-Tagle |
| María Alejandra Sepúlveda Toro | PS | March 11, 2000 | 2003 | Ricardo Lagos Escobar |
| Aldo Signorelli Guerra | PRSD | 2004 | March 11, 2006 | Ricardo Lagos Escobar |
| Guillermo Arenas Escudero | PPD | March 11, 2006 | 2008 | Michelle Bachelet Jeria |
| Christian Behm Sepúlveda | Ind. | March 1, 2009 | March 11, 2010 | Michelle Bachelet Jeria |
| Christian Behm Sepúlveda | Ind. | March 11, 2010 | January 1, 2011 | Sebastián Piñera Echenique |
| Rodrigo Durán López | Ind. | May 25, 2011 | October 11, 2013 | Sebastián Piñera Echenique |
| Claudia Gallardo Latsague | Ind. | October 11, 2013 | August 7, 2014 | Sebastián Piñera Echenique |
| Teresa Alanis Zuleta | Ind. | August 21, 2014 (Note: Assumed as acting national director (s) on August 7, and was confirmed in the position on August 21.) | October 23, 2015 | Michelle Bachelet Jeria |
| Luis Acevedo Quintanilla | PDC | October 23, 2015 | October 24, 2016 | Michelle Bachelet Jeria |
| Jorge Álvarez Vásquez | Ind. | October 24, 2016 | March 11, 2018 | Michelle Bachelet Jeria |
| Jorge Álvarez Vásquez | Ind. | March 11, 2018 | October 16, 2020 | Sebastián Piñera Echenique |
| Sergio Mierzejewski Lafferte | Ind. | June 11, 2021 (Note: Assumed as acting national director (s) on October 16, 2020, being confirmed in the position —as national director— by the Minister of Justice and Human Rights Hernán Larraín on June 11, 2021.) | March 11, 2022 | Sebastián Piñera Echenique |
| Sergio Mierzejewski Lafferte | Ind. | March 11, 2022 | March 22, 2022 | Gabriel Boric Font |
| Jorge Núñez Silva (s) | Ind. | March 22, 2022 | December 13, 2022 | Gabriel Boric Font |
| Omar Morales Márquez | PR | December 13, 2022 | Incumbent | Gabriel Boric Font |

== Non-profit organizations ==
The Register of Non-Profit Legal Entities in Chile is a mandatory and centralized registration system, managed by the Civil Registry and Identification Service, aimed at formalizing associations, foundations, community organizations, neighborhood councils, and communal unions that do not seek profit.

The entities that must register in this system are divided into two main categories: those constituted under Title XXXIII of Book I of the Civil Code, such as corporations and foundations, and those governed by special laws, such as sports, religious, indigenous organizations, and some educational institutions that become non-profit legal entities.

=== Registration Process ===
Since 2023, the registration of new entities, as well as the modification of statutes and dissolutions, is carried out through the Municipal Secretariats corresponding to the entity's domicile. Once the procedure is completed in the Municipal Secretariat, it is responsible for sending the information to the Civil Registry, where the final registration in the national register is carried out.

=== Requirements and Documentation ===
To complete the registration, various documents are required, including the registration form, a copy of the founding documents of the act, and in some cases, express authorization issued by the entity's constitutive body. These requirements vary depending on the type of organization and the nature of the procedure (registration, board modification, etc.).

=== Obligations and Benefits ===
Once registered, non-profit legal entities acquire a series of obligations, including the regular updating of their information in the register and compliance with accounting and tax regulations. In return, these organizations can access various benefits, such as the ability to receive tax-exempt donations, participate in public tenders, and apply for competitive funds.

== See also ==
- Civil Registry
