= Adriana Muñoz D'Albora =

Chilean politician

Adriana Muñoz
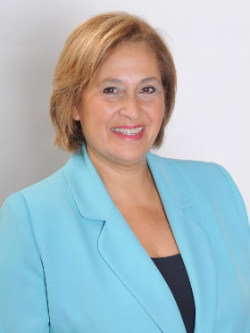

President of the Senate of Chile
- In office 17 March 2020 – 17 March 2021
- President: Sebastián Piñera
- Preceded by: Jaime Quintana
- Succeeded by: Yasna Provoste

Senator
- In office 11 March 2014 – 11 March 2022
- Preceded by: Gonzalo Uriarte
- Succeeded by: Matías Walker
- Constituency: Coquimbo Region

President of the Chamber of Deputies of Chile
- In office 11 March 2002 – 13 March 2003
- President: Ricardo Lagos
- Preceded by: Luis Pareto González
- Succeeded by: Isabel Allende Bussi

Member of the Chamber of Deputies of Chile
- In office 11 March 1998 – 11 March 2014
- Constituency: 9th district
- In office 11 March 1990 – 11 March 1994
- Preceded by: District created
- Succeeded by: Zarko Luksic
- Constituency: 16th district

Personal details
- Born: 25 September 1948 (age 77) Santiago, Chile
- Party: Party for Democracy

Adriana Blanca Cristina Muñoz d'Albora (born 25 September 1948) is a Chilean sociologist and politician who serves as a member of the Senate of Chile, representing the 4th constituency of the Coquimbo Region. She previously served as president of the Senate of Chile.

== Early life and education ==
Adriana Blanca Cristina Muñoz d'Albora was born in Santiago on 25 September 1948. She is the oldest of five children in a Christian family. Her father owned a store and her mother was a housewife. She completed high school in 1965 at the Jesús de Nazareno Passionist Religious School, before studying sociology at the University of Chile in Santiago from 1966 to 1968. Her professors included Clodomiro Almeyda and she later said she "intellectually became a Marxist". Muñoz joined the Socialist Party of Chile in 1967 and was an elected delegate to the University of Chile Student Federation. She became a Trotskyist and travelled to Cuba in 1969, returning to "work hard for the revolution." She said, "we were trying to radicalize the party from within ... [w]e were trying to redistribute the wealth ... we had time to reflect in exile on how out of touch we were with the sense of security Chileans cherish and how threatened they felt by our great schemes."

== Early career and exile ==
Muñoz worked at the Agrarian Reform Corporation and Rural Training Program from 1971 until 1973. At age 22, she was an undersecretary in the Allende administration's Department of Agriculture. She later said she was "swallowed up" in the intensity of party militancy and "oblivious to the risks."

After the 1973 coup, Muñoz went into exile with her husband and infant son in Vienna, where she lived until 1982. While in Austria, she completed a master's in sociology and began a doctorate in political science and sociology at the University of Vienna. She was a researcher for the Austria Project in the International Economic System in Luxembourg.

== Return to Chile ==
Muñoz returned to Chile in 1982, selling signs in her brother's shop for nearly two years. She eventually became a researcher in various projects for the Women's Study Center (CEM). In 1987, she founded the Institute for Women. In the 1990s, she was a consultant for the United Nations Economic Commission for Latin America and the Caribbean and the IDEAS Foundation for progress, and an advisor to the Ministry General Secretariat of the Chilean government. Between 1997 and 1999, she was vice president of the College of Sociologists of Chile.

After her return from exile, Muñoz worked with Ricardo Nuñez to reconstruct the Socialist Party and in 1986 she led the reconstitution of the Federation of Socialist Women, of which she was president from 1988 to 1990. She participated in the founding of the Party for Democracy (PPD) in 1987 and was vice president of the PPD from 1991 to 1992, from 2000 to 2002 and again from 2009 to 2010.

=== Political career ===
Muñoz was elected to the Chamber of Deputies of Chile representing the PPD for District 16 in 1989. In 1991, she introduced a bill to decriminalize therapeutic abortion, but it died in committee without debate. She chaired the Labor Committee from 1990 to 1993. She ran for re-election in 1993 but was defeated, owing in part to lack of support from her own party after the most conservative presidential candidate José Piñera focused part of his campaign on attacking her for her abortion initiative. She later reflected that she had also failed to connect and communicate well with her district.

From 1993 to 1997, Muñoz served under José Joaquín Brunner as liaison between the Executive and Congress. Muñoz was elected deputy for District 9 (part of the Santiago Metropolitan Region) in December 1997 and was vice president of the Chamber from 11 March – 8 October 1998. She authored draft laws on intrafamily violence, sexual harassment, and constitutional reform. She was re-elected in December 2001, and from 11 March 2002 – 13 March 2003 was president of the Chamber, the first woman in the position. In 2002, she supported the proposal to legalize divorce. Later that year she said, "The country is afraid of debate. Or we as the beaten-down left are afraid to be considered adding once again to divisiveness, destruction. There is a very strong trauma within us."

Muñoz was re-elected again in the December 2009 election for a fourth term representing District 9. In the November 2013 election, Muñoz was elected as PPD candidate for the Senate for the fourth circumscription, representing the Coquimbo Region. On 7 July 2015, she became the first woman vice president of the Senate, holding the position until March 2016. She has been called one of the country's "most active feminist legislators."

On 17 March 2020, Muñoz was elected president of the Senate with 22 votes to 14 over Chile Vamos's Carmen Gloria Aravena. She is the second woman to hold the position after Isabel Allende. An agreement had been made between parties that the president would be a member of the PPD, and her colleague Felipe Harboe declined nomination for the role due to the need for greater gender equality and female participation, saying "It will be an honor for me to continue working for parity, committing myself to working for the defense of women's rights." Muñoz advocates for gender parity.

Muñoz supports the effort to change Chile's constitution. After the October 2019 protests, Muñoz announced the creation of a Truth Justice and Reparation Commission, criticising the government for confusing social demonstration with vandalism. Former president of the Constitutional Court Marisol Peña criticised Muñoz for "legislative populism", saying she was willing to ignore the constitution for what people want. In October 2020, Muñoz said that over 800 people have been detained without due process for over a year after the protests, although this number has been disputed. Muñoz said she condemned violence but not social protest. But she affirmed that she did not agree with bringing the election forward, saying, "President Piñera has run a bad government, but he was elected by the people. I belong to a generation that is very afraid of institutional breakdowns."

== Publications ==
- Muñoz, Adriana (1988). Fuera feminista y democracia: Utopía a realizar (in Spanish). Santiago: Centro de Estudios Económicos y Sociales.
- Muñoz D'Albora, Adriana; Ramírez, Dora Cecilia; Luna, Lola G.; León, Magdalena; Ramírez Rodríguez, María Himelda; Roldán, Martha; Palma de Feuillet, Milagros; Valente, Virginia Vargas (1992). Género, clase y raza en América Latina: algunas aportaciones (in Spanish). Seminario Interdisciplinar Mujeres y Sociedad, Universitat de Barcelona.
- Muñoz D'Albora, Adriana (1996). "Mujer y política: complejidades y ambivalencia de una relación" (in Spanish). CEPAL.
- Munoz D'Albora, Adriana; Wojciechowski Levine, Scarlett (1996). "La importancia de una ley de cuotas en Chile" (Document) (in Spanish). Santiago: Fundación IDEAS.

== Personal life ==
Muñoz is divorced and has a son. She separated from her husband while in exile in Austria.
