= Adriana Muñoz =

Adriana Muñoz may refer to:

- Adriana Muñoz D'Albora, Chilean sociologist and politician
- Adriana Muñoz (athlete), Cuban middle-distance runner
- Adriana Ozores Muñoz, Spanish actress
