= Maqui =

Maqui can refer to:

- Aristotelia chilensis, or maqui berry, a plant from South America
- Maqui Edicions, a Spanish publishing house specialized in role-playing games; see Vajra Enterprises
- Spanish Maquis, resistance in Spain against the Francoist State
- Maqui, a term, ultimately of Algonquian origin, used by French colonists for the Mohawk People
- Maqui - a type of informal outdoor restaurant in the Ivory Coast

== See also ==
- Maki (disambiguation)
- Maquis (disambiguation)
