= Maquis =

Maquis initially referred to Maquis shrubland, a Mediterranean shrubland biome, and came to be associated with the armed resistance groups which hid in the terrain covered with that scrub growth.

== Resistance groups ==
- Maquis (World War II), predominantly rural guerrilla bands of the French and Belgian Resistance
- Spanish Maquis, guerrillas who fought against Francoist Spain in the aftermath of the Spanish Civil War
- Maquis of Fizi, the site of a Cold War-era rival government in Zaire
- The network of rural bases operated by the Communist Party of Kampuchea prior to the Cambodian Civil War
- The Combattants de la Libération, also known as Le Maquis Rouge, a guerrilla group established by the Algerian Communist Party during the Algerian War of Independence
- Maquis (Star Trek), fictional resistance movement in the Star Trek universe
  - "The Maquis" (Star Trek: Deep Space Nine), television episode that introduced the group

== Other uses ==
- Maquis shrubland, a Mediterranean shrubland biome known as macchia in Italian
- Aristotelia chilensis, a bush in southern Chile, locally known as maqui
- Maquis (pigeon), a pigeon that received the Dickin Medal for service during the Second World War
- A particular type of outdoor restaurant in the Ivory Coast, providing local food, are known as Maquis

== See also ==
- Maki (disambiguation)
- Maqui (disambiguation)
- Marquis (disambiguation)
