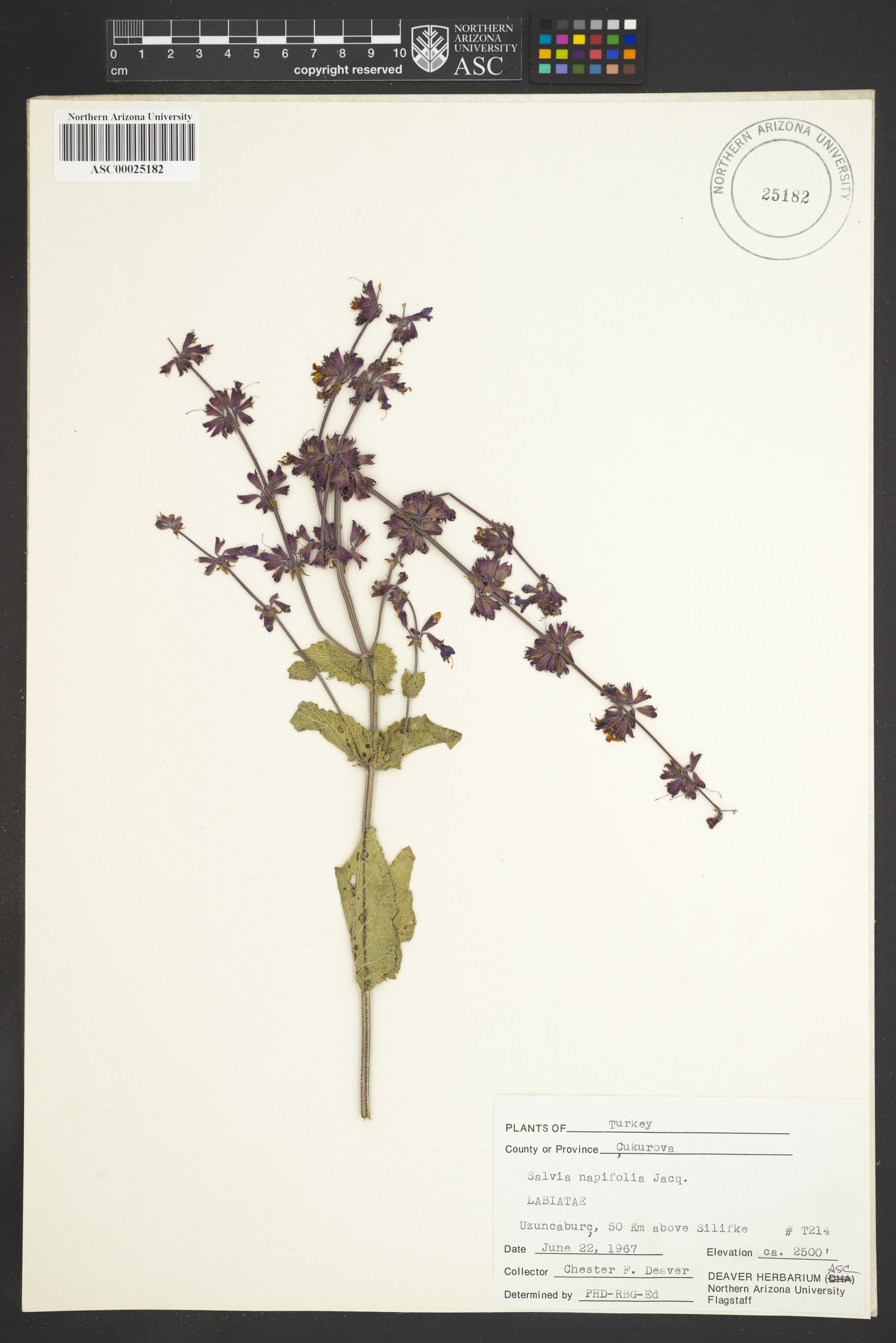

Scientific classification
- Kingdom: Plantae
- Clade: Tracheophytes
- Clade: Angiosperms
- Clade: Eudicots
- Clade: Asterids
- Order: Lamiales
- Family: Lamiaceae
- Genus: Salvia
- Species: S. napifolia

Binomial name
- Salvia napifolia Jacq.

= Salvia napifolia =

Species of flowering plant

Salvia napifolia is a herbaceous perennial native to Turkey and islands off its west coast, growing at elevations between sea level and 3,000 feet. Its natural habitat is maquis shrubland, rocky slopes, and disturbed roadsides. It was described by Nikolaus Joseph von Jacquin in 1773, with the specific epithet napifolia referring to the leaves being shaped like a turnip.

Salvia napifolia is small and clumping, with many upright stems, and soft leaves lightly covered with hairs. Widely spaced and dense whorls of flowers grow on 1 foot inflorescences, with several inflorescences coming into bloom at the same time. The tiny flowers are pale lavender to purplish violet, with equal length calyx and corolla, measuring about .5 inch in total length.
