= Juan Fernandez Women's Group =

Human rights organisation

Juan Fernandez Women's Group (in Spanish: Agrupación de Mujeres de Juan Fernández) is a Chilean women's rights organization based in the Juan Fernandez Islands. It works to advocate for women in the islands, with focus on economic opportunities, the reduction of gender-base violence, and intersectional issues affecting the environment and sustainability. One example is a programme with the Ministry of Agriculture to encourage entrepreneurism: women are encouraged to harvest berries of invasive species such as maqui and murtilla and create products for sale and export. In 2024 the group was presented with a 3D printer by a ham radio expedition team.

Presidents of the group have included: Angela Bravo, Paula Bravo Paredes, Irene Retamal Contreras, among others. The group is administered by an elected board of directors. The organisation works in collaboration with the Office of Women of the Juan Fernandez municipality.
