= Marisol Peña =

Chilean jurist and educator

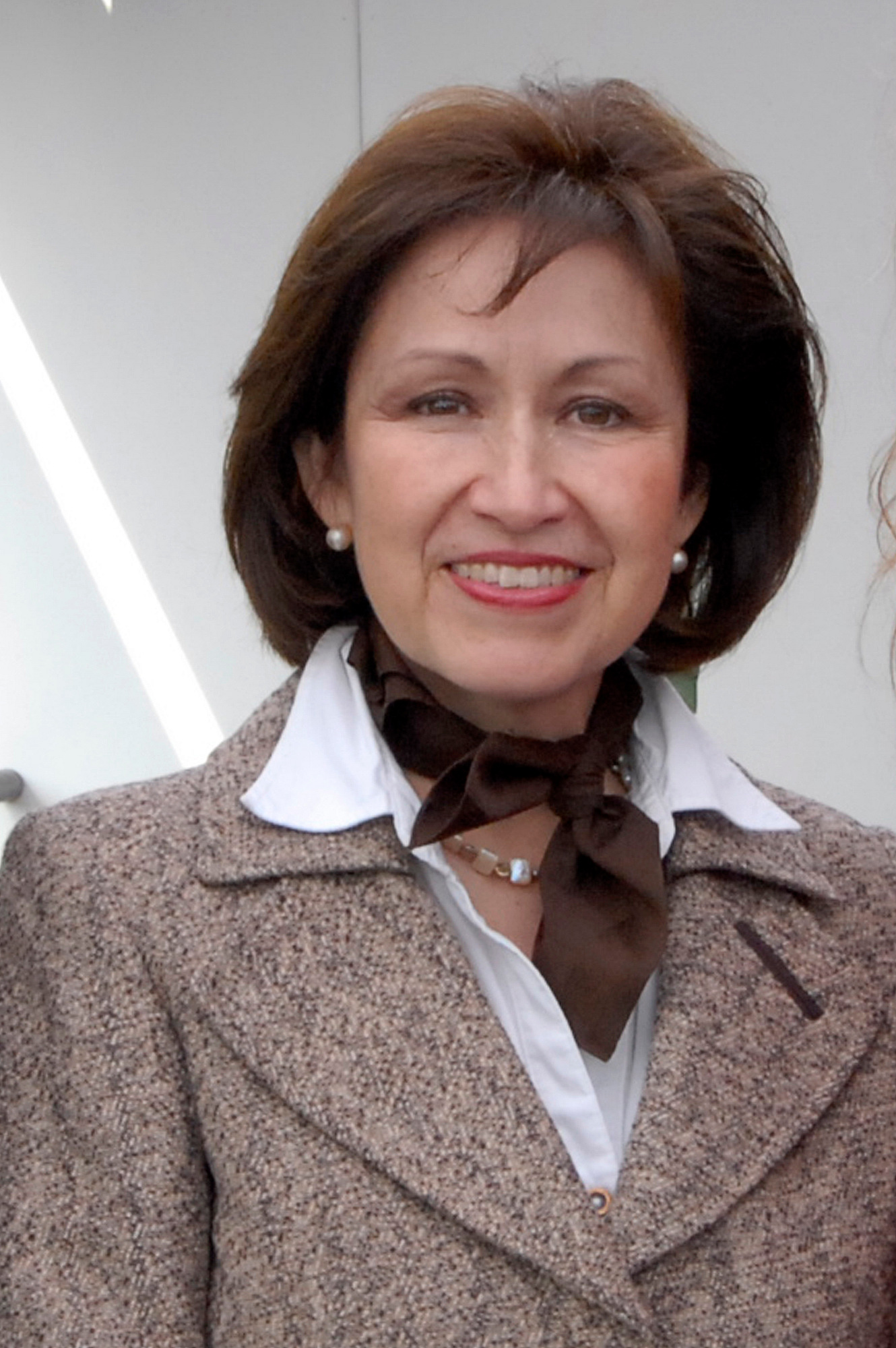
- Peña in 2009

Minister of the Constitutional Court of Chile
- In office May 2006 – 8 June 2018

President of the Constitutional Court of Chile
- In office 22 August 2013 – 29 August 2014
- Preceded by: Raúl Bertelsen
- Succeeded by: Carlos Carmona Santander

Personal details
- Born: Marisol Peña Torres; 20 January 1960 (age 65) Santiago, Chile
- Education: Rafael Landívar University; Pontifical Catholic University of Chile; University of Chile
- Occupation: Jurist, educator

Marisol Peña Torres (born 20 January 1960) is a Chilean jurist and educator.

She was a minister of the Constitutional Court of Chile (TC) from 2006 to 2018, serving as its president from 2013 to 2014.

She is a professor at the Faculty of Law and current secretary general of the Pontifical Catholic University of Chile (PUC).

== Early life and education ==
Marisol Peña was born in Santiago on 20 January 1960. She studied law at Rafael Landívar University in Guatemala, and at the PUC. She graduated in 1981 with maximum distinction, and received the Monsignor Carlos Casanueva and Luis Gutiérrez Allende awards for her academic performance and participation in activities at the PUC Faculty of Law. She earned her law degree the following year.

She completed a master's degree in international studies at the University of Chile in 2002.

== Academic and professional career ==
Peña has taught at the PUC since 1982, where she occupies the chairs of political law, public international law, and constitutional law. She took over the latter in 1991 after the murder of professor and senator Jaime Guzmán. She has received the school's awards for "teaching excellence" and "recognition of teaching excellence".

Together with professor José Luis Cea, she organized the master's and postgraduate programs in constitutional law at the PUC Faculty of Law, and was its first academic secretary. In 2005, she was elected a member of the faculty's council and, at the beginning of 2006, director of the public law department. In June 2018, she became secretary general of the PUC.

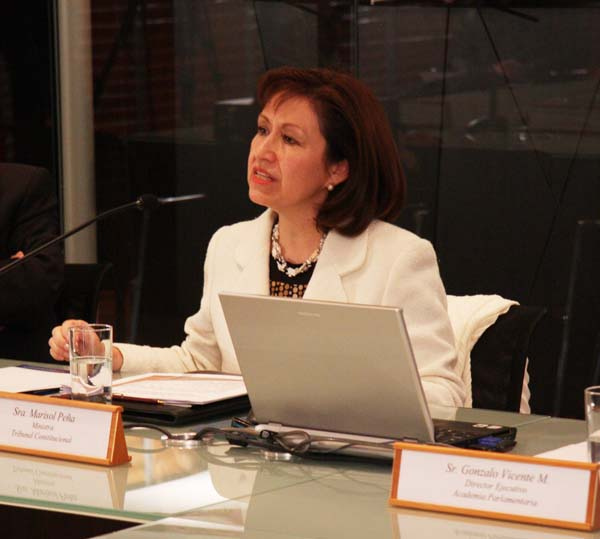
Peña in 2010

She has also taught constitutional law at the University of Chile, University of Santiago, Maritime University of Chile, and University of the Americas, as well as at the National Academy of Political and Strategic Studies and the War Academy of the Chilean Army.

In 2004, Peña received a grant from the Bar Association of Chile to participate in the Course on European Community Law Applied to Latin America. Since 2004, she has been a member of the board of directors of the Chilean Constitutional Law Association. In 2018, she was appointed a full member of the Chilean Academy of Social, Political, and Moral Sciences.

She has published articles related to matters of political, constitutional, and international law in several national legal journals.

She has also practiced as a lawyer for the Municipalities Division of the Office of the Comptroller General, and legal advisor to the Ministries of the General Secretariat of Government and the General Secretariat of the Presidency.

== Minister of the Constitutional Court ==
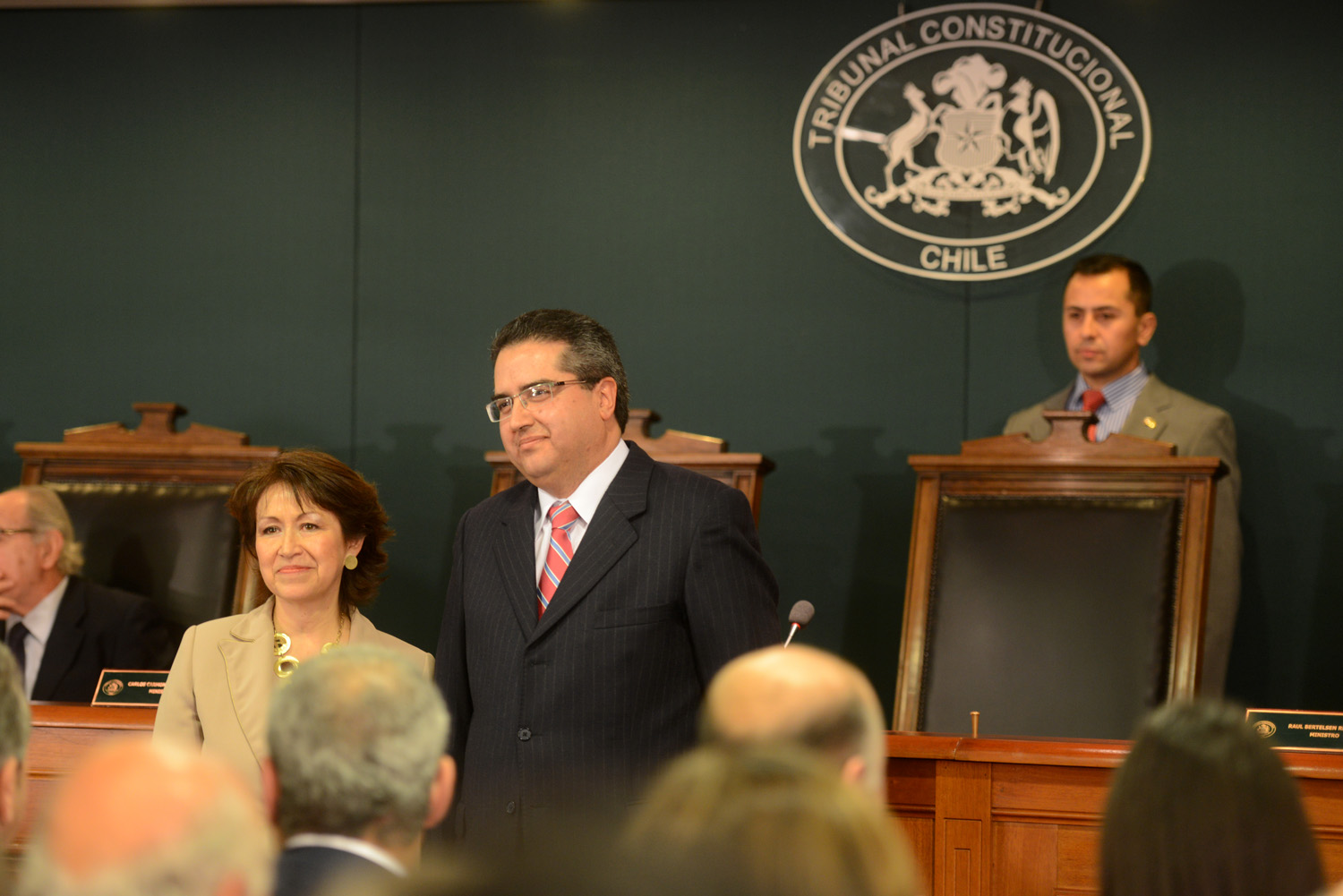
Peña at the transfer of the presidency of the Constitutional Court to Carlos Carmona

In January 2006, Peña was appointed as a member lawyer of the Constitutional Court of Chile (TC) and, that May, TC minister, by the Supreme Court, replacing Urbano Marín. In June 2009, the plenary session of the Supreme Court ratified her as TC minister for a new nine-year term.

During her time on the court, she stood out for her conservative positions, including votes in favor of the unconstitutionality of the distribution of Levonorgestrel (the "morning after pill") in the public health system, and the Inter-American Development Bank loan to Transantiago.

On 22 August 2013, she was elected president of the TC, a position she assumed on 26 August, becoming the first woman to serve as such. She resigned from the presidency of the court on 29 August 2014, and was replaced by Carlos Carmona Santander.

She resigned as TC minister on 8 June 2018.
