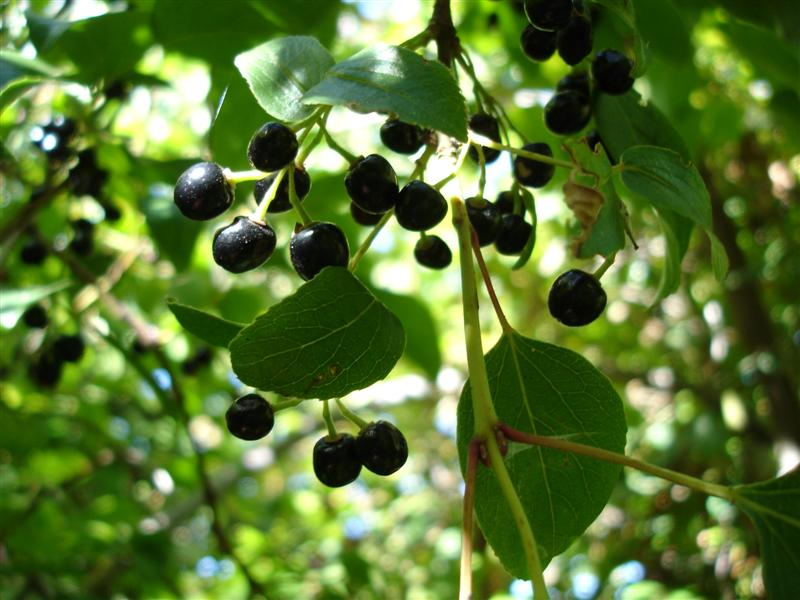
- Maqui tree with fruits

Scientific classification
- Kingdom: Plantae
- Clade: Tracheophytes
- Clade: Angiosperms
- Clade: Eudicots
- Clade: Rosids
- Order: Oxalidales
- Family: Elaeocarpaceae
- Genus: Aristotelia
- Species: A. chilensis

Binomial name
- Aristotelia chilensis (Molina) Stuntz
- The native area of the rainforest

Synonyms
- Aristotelia glabra Miers; Aristotelia glandulosa Ruiz & Pav.; Aristotelia lucida Salisb.; Aristotelia macqui L'Hér.; Aristotelia macqui var. andina Phil.; Beaumaria macqui Deless. ex Steud.

= Aristotelia chilensis =

Species of tree native to Chile and Argentina

Aristotelia chilensis, known as maqui or Chilean wineberry, is a tree species in the Elaeocarpaceae family native to South America in the Valdivian temperate forests of Chile and adjacent regions of southern Argentina. Limited numbers of these trees are cultivated in gardens for their small edible fruits. Wild-harvested fruits are commercially marketed.

The species has drawn attention for its forensic potential as it is reported to be among the first plants to grow around pig carcasses, which are experimental substitutes for human corpses, in southern Chile.

== Description ==
=== Tree ===
Aristotelia chilensis is a small dioecious evergreen tree that can reach 4 to 5 metres (13 to 16 ft) in height. Its divided trunk has a smooth bark. Its branches are abundant, thin and flexible. Its leaves are simple, opposite, hanging, oval-lanceolate, naked and coriaceous, with serrated edges. The leaf venation is highly visible, and the leaf stalk is a strong red color.

In the beginning of spring, the tree sheds the old leaf cohort, which is used as a carbohydrate source to form the new leaves and flowers.

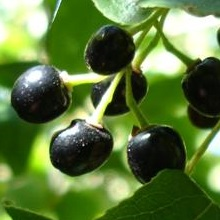
The berries of the maqui tree

=== Flowers and berries ===
When A. chilensis flowers at the end of spring, the white flowers are unisexual and small, eventually yielding a small edible fruit. The small purple-black berries that form are approximately 4 to 6 millimetres (0.16 to 0.24 in) in diameter and contain 4 to 8 angled seeds. A seven-year-old tree can produce up to 10 kilograms (22 lb) of berries per year. With fruit that tastes similar to blackberries, the species is known as the Chilean wineberry, and locally in Spanish as maqui or maque.

== Taxonomy ==
The maqui was first scientifically described by Juan Ignacio Molina in 1782, who named it Cornus chilensis. In 1914, Stephen Conrad Stuntz assigned it to the genus Aristotelia that had been erected by Charles Louis L'Héritier de Brutelle in 1786, and made the new combination A. chilensis.

== Distribution ==
Aristotelia chilensis is native to Chile and Argentina near the southwest coast of South America. It is found naturally in Chilean rainforests. Its native range spans the area between the Coquimbo and Aysén regions of Chile, and is 170,000 hectares (420,000 acres) in total.

== Ecology ==
Maqui berries are a favored food for birds at the end of summer. Deforestation of the Valdivian temperate forests in Chile suppresses seed dispersal by birds and leads to inbreeding depression. It is viewed as an invasive species in the Juan Fernandez Islands.

== Harvesting and cultivation ==
The berries of A. chilensis are collected from wild plants from December to March of each year by families, mainly Mapuche, who collect their harvest near the Andes Mountains. The harvesting process involves collecting the side branches of trees, shaking them to separate the berries and leaves from the branches, and then employing a mechanical process to separate the berries from the leaves. In the Juan Fernandez Islands, the Juan Fernandez Women's Group has led efforts to reduce the presence of the species by encouraging local women to harvest to berries and create products for sale with them.

The stored fruits are sold in local markets, with prices ranging from $6.5 to $15 per kilogram ($2.9 to $6.8/lb). The average area yield is about 220 kilograms (490 lb) per hectare annually, with an estimated yearly total of only 90 short tons (180,000 lb), due to remote access and difficulty of transportation.

Aristotelia chilensis is planted in home gardens and is not grown on an orchard scale. Most of the fruits on the market have been gathered from the wild. Maqui is frost sensitive and fairly tolerant of seaside conditions. It prefers a well-drained soil in full sun, with some protection against cold, drying winds. The soil should be slightly acidic, with moderate fertility.

Aristotelia chilensis can be planted in USDA zones 8 to 12. It is cultivated in Spain, and in milder, moister areas of Britain, where winter freezes cause dieback, thereby stimulating growth of more shoots in spring.

=== Propagation ===
Seeds of A. chilensis germinate without cold stratification. In zones with the possibility of frost, it is recommended to sow in spring in a greenhouse. If they have grown enough, by autumn, the new plants can be planted into individual pots. The potted plants should stay in the greenhouse for the first winter.

The following year, after the last expected frost in spring, the plants can be planted out into their final positions. In their first winter outdoors, some type of frost protection is required. For further propagation, vegetative propagation is possible: cuttings of wood with a length of 15 to 30 centimetres (5.9 to 11.8 in) can be planted into pots. These cuttings normally root, and can be planted out in the following spring.

== Phytochemicals ==
Polyphenol research on maqui berries showed anthocyanin content to include eight glucoside pigments of delphinidin and cyanidin, with the principal anthocyanin being delphinidin 3-sambubioside-5-glucoside (34% of total anthocyanins). The average total anthocyanin content was 138 milligrams (2.13 gr) per 100 grams (3.5 oz) of fresh fruit, or 212 milligrams (3.27 gr) per 100 grams (3.5 oz) of dry fruit, ranking maqui berries low among darkly pigmented fruits for anthocyanin content (see table at anthocyanins).

One study found that anthocyanins are also present in maqui leaves. Other phytochemicals extracted from the leaves were the alkaloids aristoteline, aristoquinoline, and aristone.
