= Domestic violence in Chile =

Domestic violence in Chile (locally referred to as violencia intrafamiliar) is a prevalent problem as of 2004. Domestic violence describes violence by an intimate partner or other family members, regardless of the place the violence occurs.

== Extent ==
Violence against women was prevalent across all classes of Chilean society by 1994. As of the early 1990s, it was reported that domestic violence affects about fifty percent of the women in Chile. All socioeconomic classes are affected by domestic violence, with some groups having higher rates of domestic violence than others. Consistent with these findings, a 2003 Chilean national survey indicated that 25–30% of female homicides occur at home.

A 2004 Chilean National Women's Service (SERNAM) study reported that 50 percent of married women had suffered spousal abuse, 34 percent reported having suffered physical violence, and 16 percent reported psychological abuse (2007). Between January and November 2005, 76,000 cases of family violence were reported to the police; 67,913 were reported by women, 6,404 by men, and approximately 1,000 by children. Women are clearly the most likely to become victims of domestic violence, but other members of the household are also at risk for victimization.

It has been acknowledged that there has been a long history of sex abuse in the country's Catholic Church as well.

== Nature of domestic violence ==
Domestic violence can be physical, psychological, emotional, verbal, or sexual. Men or women may be the offender, but research indicates that women suffer disproportionately from abuse by their male partners. Throughout history, women have been viewed by society as subordinate to men, leaving them susceptible to abuse by their male partners. Additionally, the home has been viewed as an essentially private institution, impeding lawmakers from moving forward with policies against domestic violence. With many choosing to look the other way when they learn of domestic violence, this problem persists and can be difficult to address. It is a common idea that outsiders, specifically lawmakers, should not interfere with such private matters as violence in the home. Growth of the women's movement in Chile, as elsewhere, has helped raise awareness and created concern at an international level.

== Contributing factors ==
=== Economic factors ===
Among the contributing factors to domestic violence are household factors, community and societal factors, and individual factors. Household factors include size, density and violence history. Community and societal factors include media violence, poverty level, crime rate, and environmental conditions. Lastly, individual factors are educational level, gender, age, and employment status. A 1999 study conducted by psychologists found that violence is a learned behavior and is passed down through generations. Exposure to violence in early childhood increases the risk for an individual to become violent in their own home.

In 2004, 44% of the Chilean population was living in poverty, and studies have shown that low socioeconomic status and stressful life events are positively correlated with domestic violence. Additionally, a 2003 study found that poverty, and escalation of negative life events that typically accompany poverty, increase Chilean women's vulnerability to domestic abuse. So, while domestic violence occurs in all classes, it is more prevalent among poor households. In Chile, it has been found that families who experience domestic violence are usually isolated and lack supportive ties among the communities in which they live.

The geographic concentration of poverty in Chile, with regard to the socioeconomic opportunities and risk behaviors of marginalized families living in disadvantaged neighborhoods, has been linked to higher rates of domestic violence. In other parts of the world, there is some recent evidence to support reduced violence in cases where women own assets. Owning land or a house signifies a woman's option to exit a violent relationship and deters marital violence. In Chile, married women and men have equal rights to their assets upon divorce or if a spouse dies.

In rural Chile, inheritance is the principal way in which land is acquired by both men and women, whether the land has titles or not. Sometimes women cannot claim their inheritance to land without titles because the cost of legal documents is too high. The same effects on domestic violence have not been seen by female employment alone, since owning a home or land offers an immediate escape option. Land ownership can be empowering for women, a factor that, on its own, has been shown to reduce domestic violence. As these factors intersect, the risk for women is compounded and they become more susceptible to domestic violence.

=== Cultural factors ===
Until 1989, the Civil Code of Chile legally sanctioned husbands’ ownership and authority over their wives, giving men power over their female partners and leading to abuse within the home. This power dynamic created by cultural beliefs can be seen around the world and is not isolated to Chile. The belief that Chilean women are more tolerant of male violence than other women has hindered policymakers from moving forward against domestic violence. This belief leaves Chilean women unprotected and trapped within abusive homes. Because events occurring in the home have been viewed as private family matters, historically, domestic violence has been socially and culturally accepted in Chilean society.

The secrecy that has protected these offenders is exemplified by research results from 2004 that reported that 30% of women from the Region de la Metropolitana and 21% of women from the Region de la Araucania had not told anyone about their experiences with domestic abuse. The combination of these beliefs has allowed Chilean society to turn a blind eye to the domestic violence problem that plagues their communities. These myths are slowly coming to light as attitudes change and a movement against domestic violence has begun among Chilean women.

Traditional marriage and family are very important in Chilean culture. Because of this, many Chilean women are encouraged to stay in abusive relationships and marriages because there is a stigma against divorce and being single, especially if a woman has children with the abusive spouse or partner.

== Economic impacts ==
Domestic violence impacts the Chilean economy directly and indirectly. Chile has low levels of female labor force participation. A 2011 study found that while about 75% of U.S. women are engaged in paid employment, 43% of women in Chile are engaged in paid employment. More sick days are taken by battered partners, decreased household productivity, and increased healthcare costs. Increased healthcare costs are attributed to emergency room visits, mental health services, medication, and physical therapy (2011) . Criminal justice and social services costs increase with high rates of domestic violence, but studies have found that programs aimed at intervening in or preventing domestic violence are highly cost-effective.

=== Direct impacts ===
The economy of Chile is impacted by domestic violence in several ways. These costs include increased expenditures on medical treatment, police services, criminal justice system, and social services. Injury from abuse leads to more emergency room visits, hospitalizations, and treatment for sexually transmitted diseases. More time is spent by law enforcement responding to domestic violence calls, and criminal justice system costs are increased due to domestic violence court cases, which can lead, in turn, to prison costs.

=== Indirect impacts ===
With increased domestic violence rates, earnings are lower, productivity at work decreases, and labor market participation declines. A 1999 study conducted in Santiago, Chile, found that abused women were less likely to work outside the home. Another study based in Santiago, conducted in 2000, estimated that women who did not suffer physical violence earned an average of US$385 per month while women who faced physical violence at home earned only US$150 per month. This study displays the severe economic effects of domestic violence in the home.

== Impacts on Women ==
=== Mental and Psychological Impacts ===
Domestic abuse harms women mentally and psychologically in Chile. Some impacts that domestic abuse has on a woman's mental health in Chile includes Depression and PTSD. Depression is very common among Chilean women because it is linked to physical and sexual violence. Chilean women also experience PTSD because of abusive households and from significant others who are violent.

== Policy responses ==
=== Background ===
The Chilean legal system has traditionally been very weak on family violence, due to structural problems, resulting from the failure to label domestic violence as a crime and the failure to prosecute domestic violence under general assault statutes. A study conducted in 1990 in Chile showed that 83.3% of battered women's injuries were classified as ‘light injuries’ and were only punishable as a misdemeanor. Acts of violence that would otherwise be severe crimes under the law, when occurring within the home were passed as ‘light injuries’ and minimal punishment was pursued.

=== Chilean National Ministry for Women (SERNAM) ===
The Chilean National Ministry for Women (SERNAM, Servicio Nacional de la Mujer) addresses the Chilean legal systems’ treatment of domestic violence cases. SERNAM is responsible for developing preventative and remedial programs. They have opened offices across the country, providing legal and therapeutic assistance for victims of domestic violence.

In 1997, SERNAM issued a detailed set of policy proposals to assure rural women equality of opportunity, a product of consultative process.

Michelle Bachelet was the first female president of Chile, leading the country between 2006 and 2010. During her presidency, Bachelet increased the budget of the National Women's Service (SERNAM) and helped the institution gain funding from the United Nations Development Fund for Women. At the end of 2006, there were 29 government and private centers to attend to victims of intrafamily violence. During 2006, the SERNAM partnered with NGOs to conduct courses on the legal, medical, and psychological aspects of domestic violence for police officers and judicial and municipal authorities. This intensive training program by SERNAM has increasingly allowed many Chilean police to provide effective assistance in domestic violence cases. SERNAM has been active in advancing the domestic violence legislation (see below).

=== Domestic violence law of 1994 ===
The Intrafamily Violence Law passed in 1994 was the first political measure to address violence in the home, but because the law would not pass without being accepted by both sides, the law was weak in the way it addressed victim protection and punishment for abusers. The law was later reformed in 2005.

=== Medical personnel ===
Another barrier is posed by the Chilean medical personnel, which has been criticized for continuing to mistreat victims of domestic violence and to minimize injuries, even though today they are required by law to report known cases of physical assault to the criminal justice system.

=== Child sex abuse law of 2019 ===
In 2019, amid the ongoing sex crisis in Chile's Catholic Church, legislation was passed removing the statute of limitations on reporting sex abuse against children throughout Chile. The legislation, which is not retroactive, was first proposed in 2010.

== See also ==
- Women in Chile
- Crime in Chile
