= Maquis shrubland =

Type of biome in the Mediterranean region

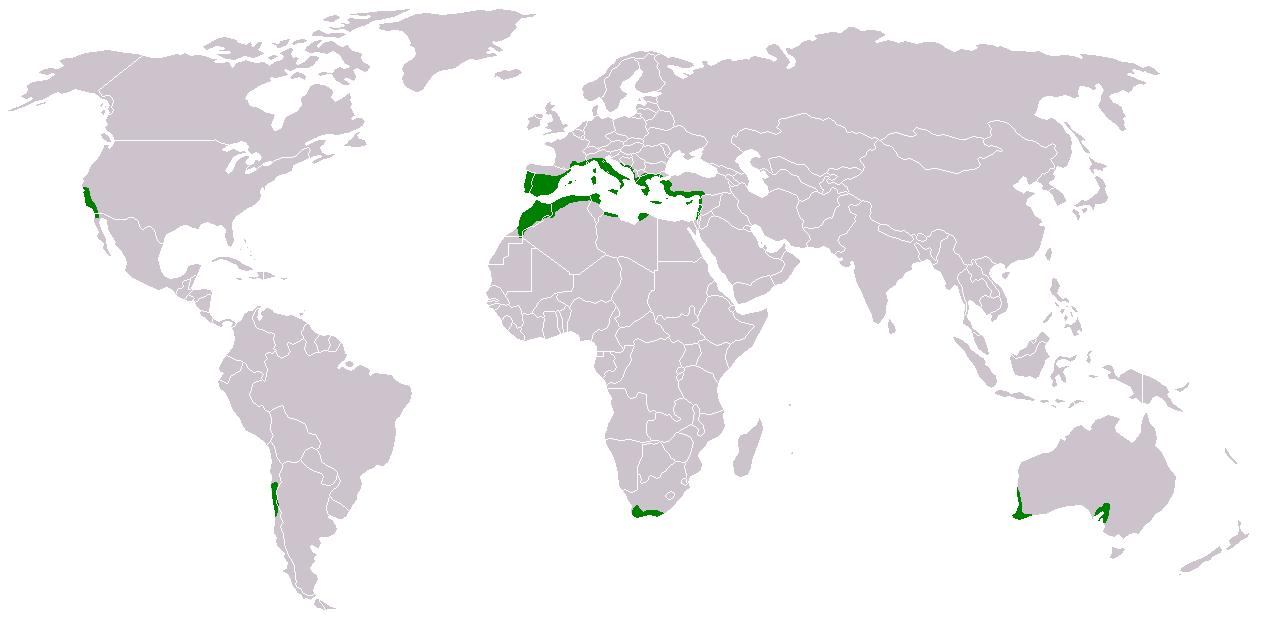
Map of maquis regions of the world

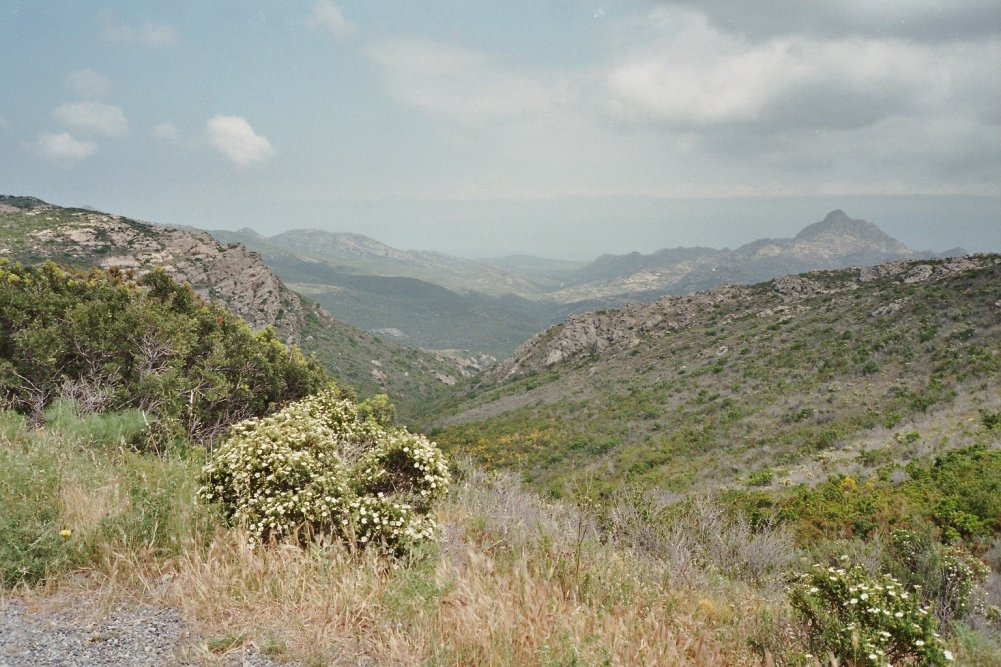
Low maquis in Corsica

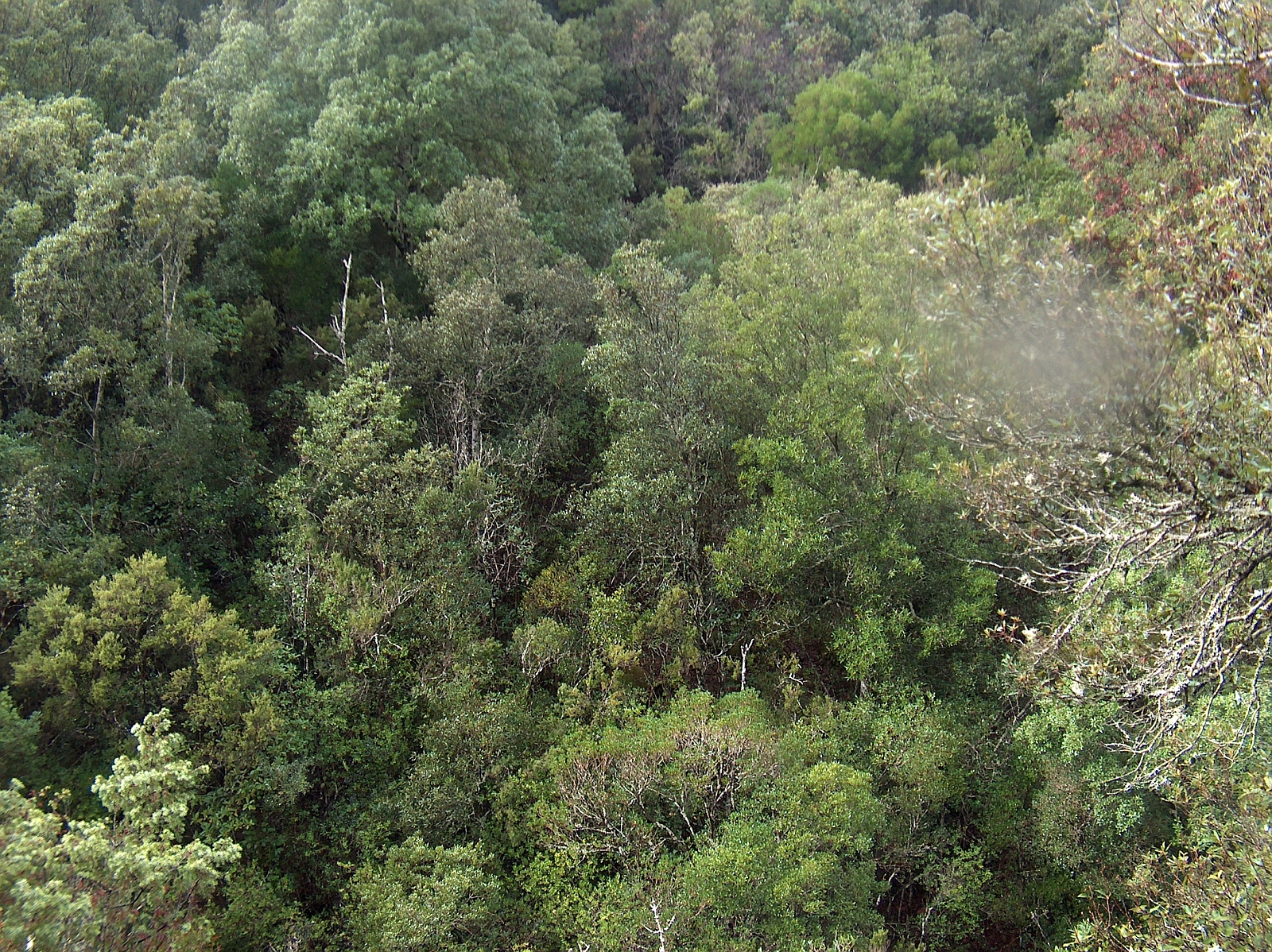
High macchia in Sardinia

Maquis (UK: /mæˈkiː/ ma-KEE, US: /mɑːˈkiː/ mah-KEE, French: [maki]) or macchia (/ˈmɑːkiə/ MAH-kee-ə, Italian: [ˈmakkja]; often macchia mediterranea in Italian; Corsican: machja, pronounced [ˈmaca]; Croatian: makija; Occitan: maquís; Catalan: màquia, Spanish: maquia) is a savanna-like shrubland biome in the Mediterranean region, typically consisting of densely growing evergreen shrubs. It is typically found in mountainous, coastal regions. The ecosystems typically have humid, temperate winters and dry summers. The soil in maquis is typically highly acidic.

== Vegetation ==
The shrubs in maquis typically top out at around 4-5 metres tall. Maquis has a sizable flora, made up of mostly xerophilous plants, many of which go dormant during the dry summer months. Common plants found in the biome include, but are not limited to:

- Plants of the family Lamiaceae
- Plants of genera Laurus
- Plants of genera Myrtus
- Olea europaea
- Ceratonia siliqua
- Ficus carica
- Quercus ilex
- Genera Phillyrea
- Rhamnus alaternus
- Pistacia lentiscus
- Arbutus unedo
- Cistus monspeliensis

== In popular culture ==
- The French phrase prendre le maquis (English: Take the maquis) means to hide from law enforcement. This phrase originates from the Corsican piglià a machja, and was popularized during the second world war due to the French resistance using the countryside to hide from the German army using tactics developed by Corsican bandits. This phrase re-entered common French lexicon during the Corsican conflict, during which guerrillas from the FLNC would hide in the dense forest to evade French authorities.
- Several bands of guerrilla fighters have been named after the maquis, like the Maquisards, Spanish Maquis, and the Maquis of Fizi. Additionally, a fictional group from several Star Trek series is known as the Maquis.

== See also ==
- Mining maquis
- Maquis (disambiguation)
- Mediterranean forests, woodlands, and scrub
- Garrigue, a similar biome
