= Stephen Conrad Stuntz =

American botanist (1875–1918)

- Photograph of Stuntz as an assistant librarian, June 1900.
- Born: April 4, 1875; Clarno, Wisconsin, United States
- Died: February 2, 1918 (aged 42); Vienna, Virginia, United States
- Other names: Stephen Conrad
- Spouse: Lena Greyson Fitzhugh
- Children: Anne Fitzhugh Stuntz (1917-1995), Elizabeth Bland Fitzhugh Stuntz (1912 - 1999), Stephen Conrad Stuntz Jr.(1913-1945), Laurance Fitzhugh Stuntz (1908-1993), Mayo Sturdevant Stuntz (1915-2013).
- Scientific career
- Fields: Botany, bryology, agriculture, history.

Signature
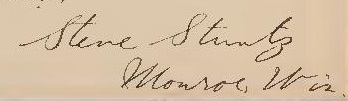

Stephen Conrad Stuntz (1875–1918) was an American botanist and fiction author.

== Life ==
Born in Green County, Wisconsin, Stephen was the child of Lydia A. Sturdevant and A.C. Stuntz, the county surveyor in Monroe. Stuntz graduated from Monroe High School in June 1892, and during the event he ran “Walks among Green County Plants” as an activity.

Majoring in botany and geology, Stuntz graduated with a Bachelor of Science from the University of Wisconsin–Madison in 1899. He then worked as an assistant at the university library and herbarium until 1902. With Laurance Charles Burke, he produced the first newsletter for the UW‑Madison libraries called The Library Item in 1900. From 1902 to 1908, he was a cataloguer with the Library of Congress, and from 1908 to 1910 he was a bibliographer with the United States Department of Agriculture's Bureau of Soils. From 1910 until his death he was a botanist with the Office of Foreign Seed and Plant Introductions. In June 1907, Stephen married Lena Greyson Fitzhugh, and together they had 5 children.

In the 1910s, Stuntz became active in the Fairfax Historical Society, becoming the society's secretary. His son, Mayo Stuntz, would later become president of the same society. S.C. Stuntz died of pneumonia in 1918.

== Published works: fiction ==
Under his pseudonym, Stephen Conrad, he wrote two humorous fiction works;

- The Second Mrs. Jim, and
- Mrs. Jim and Mrs. Jimmie; certain town experiences of the second Mrs. Jim as related to Jimmie's wife

But he also wrote short stories under the name S.C. Stuntz, including:

- The conversion of the 'H.H.' The American magazine v.55 1903

== Published major works: non-fiction ==
In the field of botany, Stuntz wrote multiple descriptions of species, primarily in the Inventory of seeds and plants imported by the Office of Foreign Seed and Plant Introduction of the United States Department of Agriculture. He also wrote:

- S.C. Stuntz. 1900. A Revision of the North American Species of the Genus Eleutera Beauv. (Neckera Hedw.) Bulletin of the Torrey Botanical Club 27(4):202–211.
- S.C. Stuntz. 1910. Reference list on the electric fixation of atmospheric nitrogen and the use of calcium cyanamid and calcium nitrate on soils.
- E.E. Free and S.C. Stuntz. 1911.The movement of soil material by the wind, with a bibliography of eolian geology.

Posthumously, he also published:

- S.C. Stuntz, and E.B. Hawks [ed.] 1941. List of the agricultural periodicals of the United States and Canada published during the century July 1810 to July 1910.

While secretary of the Fairfax Historical Society, Stuntz also wrote for the Daughters of the American Revolution magazine, and advertised himself as a "specialist in the history of Fairfax and adjoining counties of Virginia":

- S.C. Stuntz. July 1916. The Fairfax County Committee of Safety. Daughters of the American Revolution Magazine. 49:239-245.
- S.C. Stuntz. January 1917. The Carlyle House, Alexandria, Virginia. Daughters of the American Revolution Magazine. 50:4-9.

== Standard author abbreviation ==
The standard author abbreviation Stuntz is used to indicate this person as the author when citing a botanical name.

== Botanical legacy and collections ==
S.C. Stuntz authored botanical names, while working in the Office of Foreign Seed and Plant Introduction, including:

- Aristoclesia esculenta (Arruda) Stuntz now a synonym of Platonia insignis var. insignis.
- Aristotelia chilensis (Molina) Stuntz
- Assonia calantha (K.Schum.) Stuntz now a synonym of Dombeya burgessiae.
- Chaetochloa intermedia (Roem. & Schult.) Stuntz now a synonym of Setaria intermedia
- Chaetochloa lutescens Stuntz now a synonym of Cenchrus americanus
- Prosopis chilensis (Molina) Stuntz now a synonym of Neltuma chilensis

Stuntz's bryological collections are held at the University of Wisconsin Herbarium, the New York Botanical Garden, the Field Museum of Natural History, the University of Michigan Herbarium, the University of Tennessee Bryophyte Herbarium, the Peabody Museum of Natural History, and Harvard University Herbaria. A smaller number of his vascular plant collections are held by the University of Wisconsin Herbarium, and outside of North America specimens are held by the National Herbarium of Victoria Royal Botanic Gardens Victoria.
