= Women in Chile =

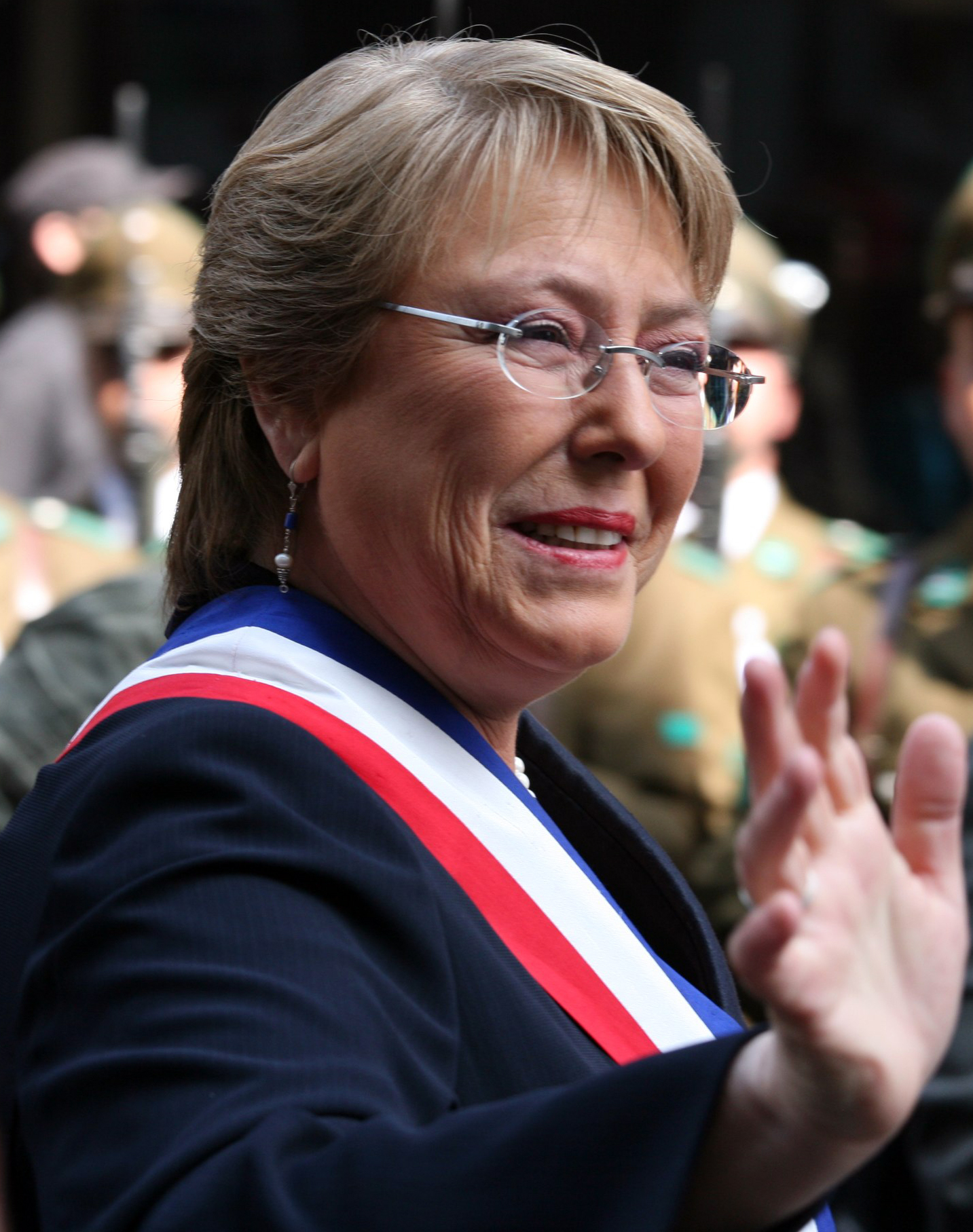
- Michelle Bachelet, who served as the first woman President of Chile from 2006 to 2010.

General statistics
- Maternal mortality (per 100,000): 25 (2010)
- Women in parliament: 22.6% (2019)
- Women over 25 with secondary education: 72.1% (2010)
- Women in labour force: 52% employment rate, data from OECD, 2016

Gender Inequality Index
- Value: 0.247 (2019)
- Rank: 55th out of 162

Global Gender Gap Index
- Value: 0.736 (2022)
- Rank: 47th out of 146

The lives, roles, and rights of women in Chile have gone through many changes over time. Chilean women's societal roles have historically been impacted by traditional gender roles and a patriarchal culture, but throughout the twentieth century, women increasingly involved themselves in politics and protest, resulting in provisions to the constitution to uphold equality between men and women and prohibit sex discrimination.

Women's educational attainment, workforce participation, and rights have improved, especially since Chile became a democracy again in 1990. Chile legalized divorce in 2004 and is also one of the few countries to have elected a female president. However, Chilean women still face many economic and political challenges, including income disparity, high rates of domestic violence, and lingering patriarchal gender roles.

== History of Women ==
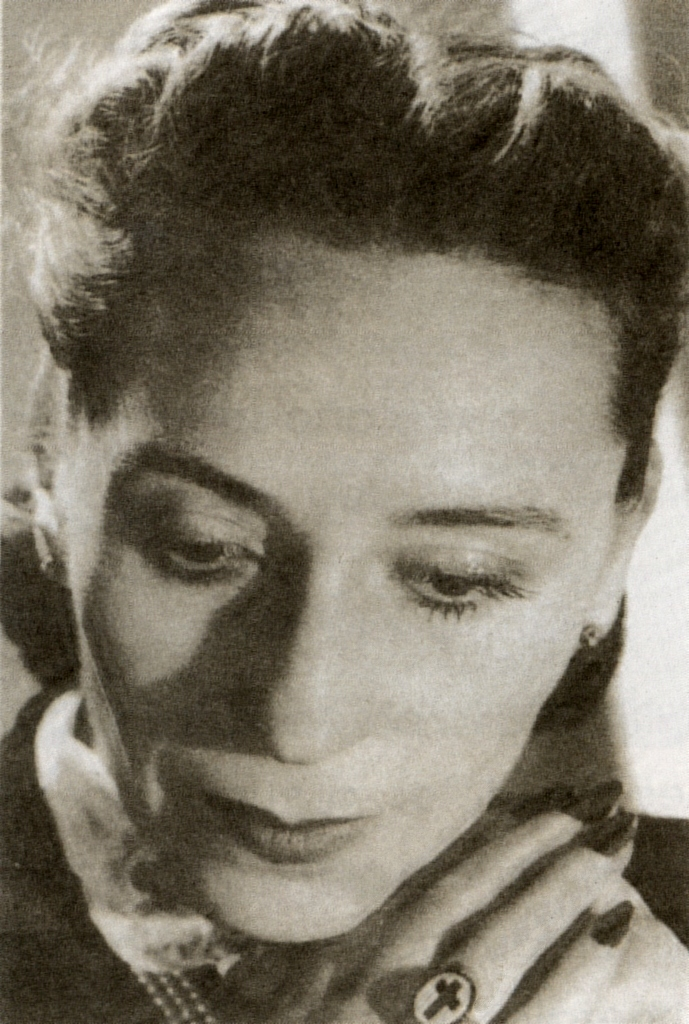
María de la Cruz, (1912–1995), Chilean political activist for women's suffrage, journalist, writer, and political commentator. In 1953, she became the first woman ever elected to the Chilean Senate

Women were granted the right to vote in 1931 and 1949 during Chile's presidential era. Also during the era, thousands of women protested against socialist president Salvador Allende in the March of the Empty Pots and Pans. While under Augusto Pinochet's authoritarian regime, women also participated in las protestas, protests against Allende's plebiscite in which women voted "no." During Chile's time under dictator Pinochet, the state of women's legal rights fell behind most of Latin America, even though Chile had one of the strongest economies in South America. Chile returned to democracy in 1990, leading to changes in women's lives and roles within society. Chile's government has committed more political and financial resources than ever before to enhancing social welfare programs since the country's return to democracy. The Concertación political party has been in power since the end of Pinochet's dictatorship, and from 2006 to 2010, Michelle Bachelet of the party served as the first female President of Chile.

=== Women in society ===
Chile has been described as one of the most socially conservative countries of Latin America. In comparison to the United States, Chile did not have so many feminists among its evolution of women's intrusion to the political sphere. Chilean women esteemed Catholicism as their rites of passage, which initiated women's movements in opposition to the liberal political party's eruption in the Chilean government. The traditional domesticated setting that women were accustomed to was used as a patriarchal reasoning for women's restriction of women's votes. However, Chileans religious convictions as devout Catholics initiated their desire to vote against the adamant anticlerical liberal party.

In 1875, Domitila Silva Y Lepe, the widow of a former provincial governor, read the requirements deeming "all adult Chileans the right to vote", and was the first woman to vote. Other elitist Chilean women followed her bold lead, which resulted in the anticlerical liberal party of congress to pass a law denying women the right to vote. Despite this set back, Ms. Lepe and other elite women expressed their religious standings to the conservative party. The conservative party were favorable of the women because they knew their support would influence the conservative party's domination in politics.

In 1912 Social Catholicism began to erupt. Social Catholicism- upper-class women's organization of working-class women-was led by Amalia Errázuriz de Subercaseaux. She introduced the Chilean Ladies League amongst 450 other upper-middle-class women with intentions to "uphold and defend the interests of those women who worked for a living without attacking the principles of order and authority". Following this organization, many other elite women began socially constructed women's institutions. Amanda Labarca was also an elitist, but disagreed with the privileged women's subjection of working-class women and founded the Círculo de Lectura (ladies reading club) in 1915. She believed women should be educated, regardless of their socioeconomic status to have a more influentially productive role in society.

=== Gender roles ===
Traditional gender role beliefs are prevalent in Chilean society, specifically the ideas that women should focus on motherhood and be submissive to men. A 2010 study by the United Nations Development Programme (UNDP) reported that 62 percent of Chileans are opposed to full gender equality. Many of those surveyed expressed the belief that women should limit themselves to the traditional roles of mother and wife. However, the 2012 World Development Report states that male attitudes toward gender equality are that "men do not lose out when women's rights are promoted."

=== Motherhood ===
Catholicism is embodied wholly among Chilean family identities. Virgin Mary is the idolized example of motherhood. Her pure and sacrificial acts are to be embodied by Chilean mothers. Traditionally, women are supposed to be the picture of endurance like the Virgin Mary. The biblical significance is portrayed through the traditional government of Chile. In the early 1900s, the gendered examples among Catholicism were embodied by the patriarchal government and suffrage of women. Women were domesticated and confined to the home. In the late 1940s women's issues were embraced by First Lady Rosa Markmann de González Videla in acknowledgement of Mothers centers, women gaining access to resources to fulfill their role as housewives, encouraged women as consumers to fight against high living costs, and to raise their interest in partaking in other avenues of public life within the country, such as work and political participation. The First Lady's efforts to advocate the evolution of women reform led to the modern techniques of the women reform. In the 1960s, campaigns for the Christian democrat, Frei, emphasized women and women's issues. Voting had just become mandatory for all Chileans and was the first time in history registration for female voters increased from thirty-five percent to seventy-five percent. The Christian democratic change of government opened women's access to birth control. However, the government's emphasis on the modernization of women institutions and underlying issues of gender hierarchy, women in poverty were neglected. Restrictions within the women's institutions, mother centers, restricted mothers under 18. To further structurally cripple Chilean women, first lady Maria Ruiz Tagle de Frei supervised "proper functioning" of feminist organizations. The Central Organization for Mothers (CEMA) was created as a formal structure to advise the underprivileged Chilean mothers. Carmen Gloria Aguayo revolutionized the mother's centers during the period of conflict between change and tradition during the Christian democrat campaign. Ms. Aguayo also headed the party's women's departments amongst forty-eight men and reflected the political direction of the initiatives: policies to protect the family- defending women's rights to work, to maternity leave, to equitable pay and occupation, a new opportunities for training and learning in the promised department for female labor studies. Because familial welfare was deemed important within the Chilean society, mothers have served as a political representation to have a voice in amongst the government.

== Legal rights ==
Currently, women have many of the same rights as men. The National Women's Service (SERNAM) is charged with protecting women's legal rights in the public sector.

=== Marriage ===
Until 2020, women lost their right to manage their own assets once they were married and husbands received all of the wealth, but that law has since changed and women can now administer their own assets. A couple can also sign a legal agreement before marriage so that all assets continue to be owned by the one who brought them into the marriage.

The Chilean Civil Code previously mandated that wives had to live with and be faithful and obedient to their husbands, but it is no longer in the law. A married woman cannot be head of the household or head of the family in the same way as a man; however, married women are not required by law to obey their husbands.

==== Divorce ====
Chile legalized divorce in 2004, overturning an 1884 legal code. The law that legalizes divorce is the New Civil Marriage Law which was first introduced as a bill in 1995. There had been previous divorce bills before, but this one managed to secure enough conservative and liberal support to pass.

With divorce now being legal, four marital statuses exist within Chile: married, separated, divorced, and widow (er). Only the divorced and widow (er) statuses allow a new marriage. Before the legalization of divorce, the only way to leave a marriage was to obtain a civil annulment which would only be granted by telling the civil registrar that the spouse had lied in some way concerning the marriage license, thereby voiding the marriage contract.

=== Property ===
In marriage, there are three types of assets: those of the husband, those of the wife, and the common assets that pertain to both. Land and houses in a marriage continue to be the property of the person who brought them to the marriage, but in order to sell them, both the husband and wife must sign. In the case of divorce, both the man and woman are entitled to ownership of the marital home. In the case of the death of a spouse, the surviving spouse, regardless of gender, has equal inheritance rights to the marital home. If there is no will when the husband dies, the wife is given an equal category as the children for inheritance. Before marriage, a couple can sign a legal document separating all assets so that the woman and man each administer her or his own; in this case, the husband cannot control his wife's assets.

If women work outside the home independent of their husbands, acquire personal assets, and can prove that they came by these assets through their independent work, then these working women can accumulate these assets as their own, unable to be touched by husbands.

Sons and daughters have equal inheritance rights to moveable and immovable property from their parents. Unmarried men and women have equal ownership rights to moveable and immoveable property.

In rural Chile, inheritance is the principal way in which land is acquired by both men and women, whether the land has titles or not. Sometimes women and men cannot claim their inheritance to land without titles because the cost of legal documents is too high.

=== Suffrage ===
Women were granted the right to vote in municipal elections in 1931 and obtained the right to vote in national elections on January 8, 1949, resulting in their ability to vote under the same equal conditions as men and increasing women's participation in politics.

=== Family law ===
Both Chilean men and women qualify for a family allowance if they have dependent children under the age of eighteen (or twenty-four if in school). There are differences in entitlement requirements for the spouse-related family allowance since a man qualifies for a family allowance if he has a dependent wife, but a woman only qualifies for a family allowance if her husband is disabled. Until a reform of paternity laws in 1998, children born outside marriage had less right to parental financial support and inheritance than children born within marriage. A bill was passed in 2007 to give mothers direct access to child support payments.

Working mothers of a certain low socioeconomic status and with proof of an employment contract and working hours receive subsidized child care through legislation passed in 1994. This system excludes: women whose household income is too high, unemployed women, women working in the informal sector, and women whose jobs are not by contract. Chile offers paid maternity leave for women working in the formal sector, paying women 100 percent of their salary during the leave, and also allows women a one-hour feeding break each day until the child has reached the age of two. Female workers unattached to the formal market and without an employment contract do not receive paid maternity leave.

Postnatal maternity leave is now six months instead of the previous three.

== Education ==
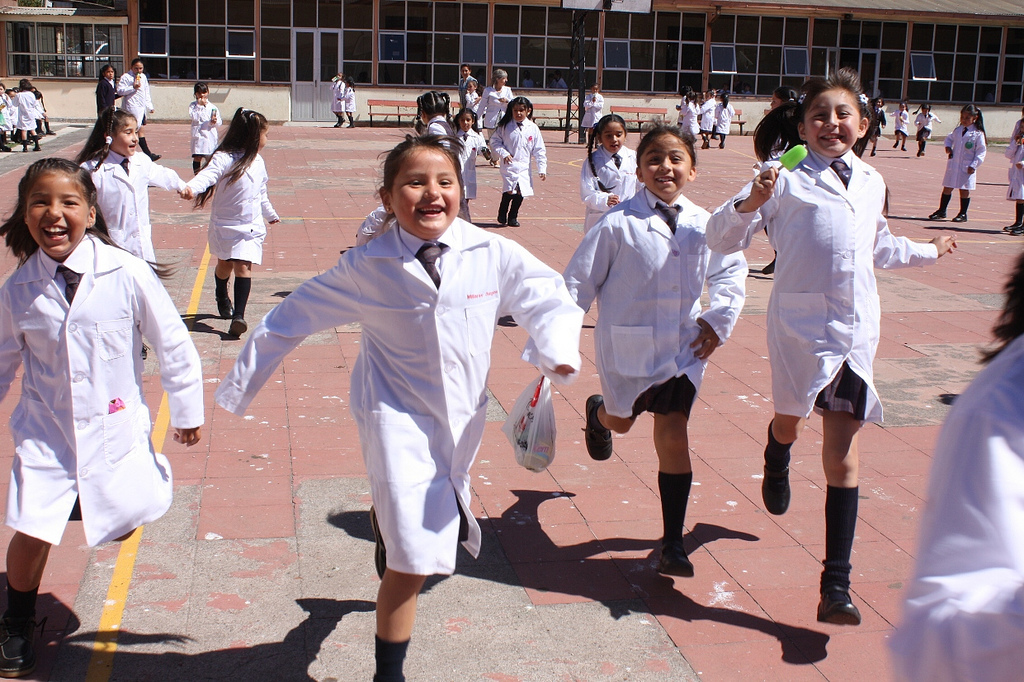
School girls running in the playground

Women's literacy rates almost match those of men, with 97.4 percent of women being able to read, versus 97.6 percent of men (in 2015). Chilean law mandates compulsory primary and secondary education for children, boys and girls. In 2007, the World Bank declared that enrollment levels for boys and girls in primary and secondary education were at a "virtual parity." Women's education in Chile is generally higher than neighboring countries. In higher education, as of 2002, women had similar attendance rates as men, with women at 47.5 percent attendance, versus men at 52.5 percent.

== Employment ==
=== Participation ===
Chile has one of the lowest rate of female employment in all of Latin America, but women's workforce participation has steadily increased over the years. As of 2016, the employment rate of women was 52%. Despite the fact that 47.5% of students in college are women, many still choose to be homemakers rather than join the workforce. A 2012 World Bank study showed that the expansion of public day care had no effect on female labor force participation. The low number of women entering the labor force causes Chile to rank low amongst upper-middle class countries regarding women in the work force despite higher educational training. In Chile, poorer women make up a smaller share of the workforce. A 2004 study showed that 81.4 percent of women worked in the service sector.

=== Formal and informal work ===
Women have increasingly moved out of unpaid domestic work and into the paid formal and informal labor markets. Many female workers are in Chile's informal sector because national competition for jobs has increased the number of low-skill jobs. In 1998, 44.8 percent of working-aged women in Chile worked in the informal sector while only 32.9 percent of men worked informally.

=== Income gap ===
For jobs that do not require higher education, women make 20 percent less money on average than men. For jobs requiring a university degree, the gap in pay increases to 40 percent. Women without a university degree make 83 percent of the income men make without a university degree. The quadrennial 2004 National Socio-Economic Survey and World Bank report in 2007 say that the overall gender income gap stands at 33 percent (since women make 67 percent of men's salaries).

== Politics ==
=== Female participation in politics ===
Women were not involved in politics until 1934, when they could first use their municipal vote. The municipal, and later national, vote caused women to involve themselves in politics more than before, pressuring the government and political parties. With women's increased political importance, many parties established women's sections for support and tried to pursue women's votes, though it would take years for political parties to truly view women as important to politics.

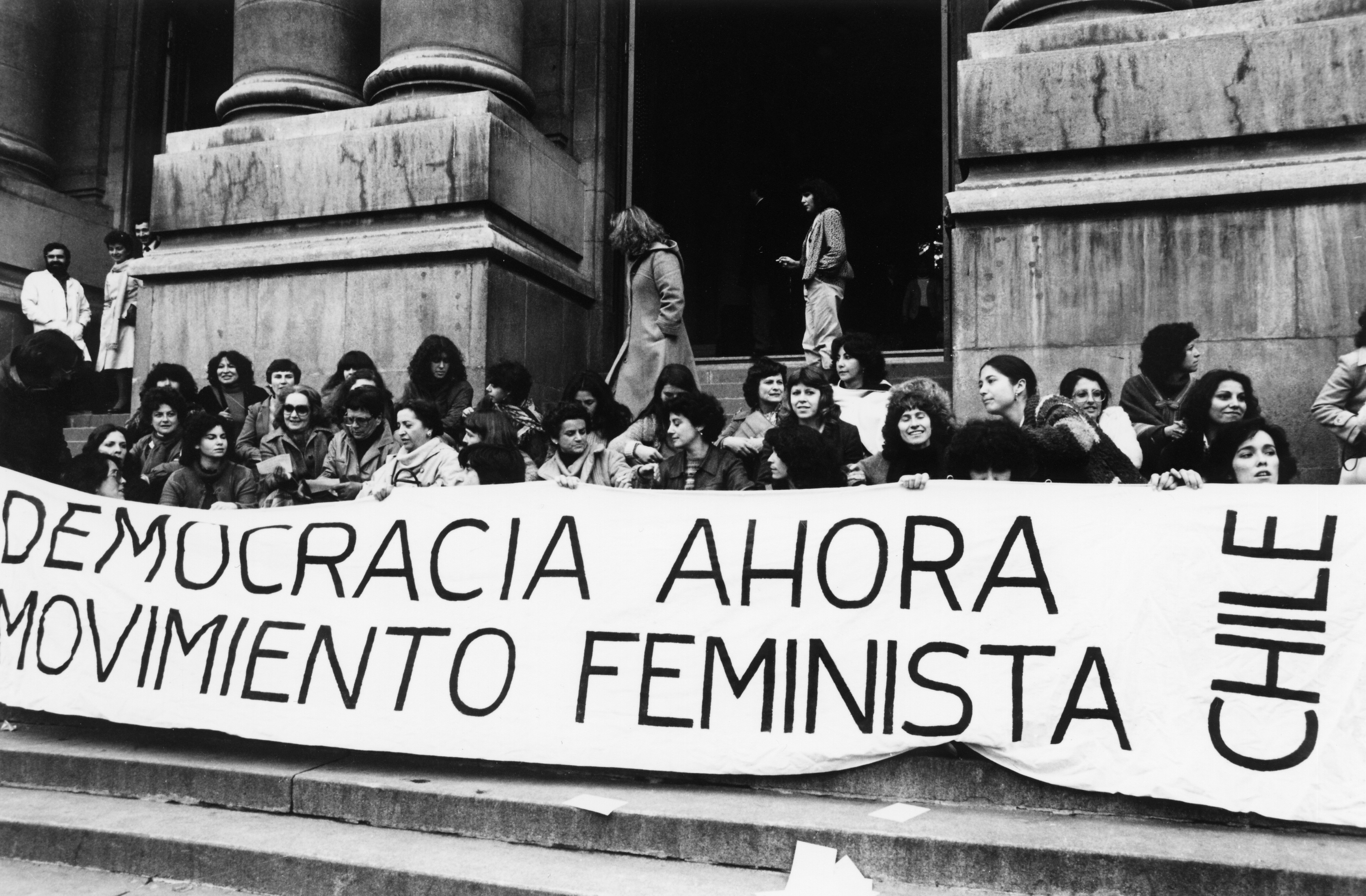
Chilean feminists gather in Santiago during Pinochet's regime

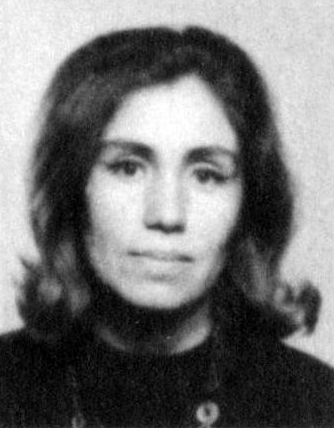
Gladys Marín (1941–2005), Chilean activist and political figure. She was Secretary-General of the Communist Party of Chile (PCCh) (1994–2002) and then president of the PCCh until her death

On December 1, 1971 thousands of women who were against the newly elected Salvador Allende marched through Santiago to protest government policies and Fidel Castro's visiting of Chile. This march, known as the March of the Empty Pots and Pans, brought together many conservative and some liberal women as a force in Chilean politics, and in 1977 Augusto Pinochet decreed the day of the march to be National Women's Day. Women also made their voices heard in the late 1980s when 52 percent of the national electorate was female, and 51.2 percent of women voted "no" in Augusto Pinochet's plebiscite. The women in these popular protests are considered to have played a central role in increasing national concern with the history of women's political activism.

As of 2006, Chile was lower than eight other Latin American countries in regards to women in political positions. With only a few women legislators, sustaining attention to the topic of women's rights a difficult task, especially in the Senate, where there are fewer female representatives than in the Chamber of Deputies. Unlike neighboring Argentina, where 41.6 percent of the Argentine Chamber of Deputies is made up of women, only 22,6 percent of Chile's lower house is made up of female representatives. Chile has no government mandate requiring that women must make up a certain percentage of party candidates. Women's political representation is low but is on the rise in many political parties, and there is growing support for a quota law concerning women's representation. The progressive parties of the Left have greater openness to the participation of women, evident in the Party for Democracy's and Socialist Party's quotas for women's representation as candidates for internal party office.

In 2009, activists demanded that presidential candidates develop reforms that would improve work conditions for women. Reforms included maternity leave, flexible work schedules and job training. Aimed at improving women's work opportunities, former president Michelle Bachelet made it illegal to ask for a job applicants' gender on applications and for employers to demand pregnancy tests be taken by employees in the public sector.

In 2022, Gabriel Boric's administration appointed Chile's first-ever majority-women cabinet upong taking office. The cabinet lost its gender parity in April 2023 but regained it in January 2025.

=== Second Wave Feminism ===
Following these Chilean women, the contemporary phase of feminism was constructed through the social conflict between socialism and feminism. The democratically elected president, Allende, was ousted on September 11, 1973, when a military coup invaded his palace, brutally excising all Popular Unity Government officials and resulting in Allende's debated suicide. This revolution "The Chilean Road to Socialism" abruptly came to an end, revitalizing the foundation of the government. However, the foundation was hastily corrupted by patriarchal values. Prominent feminist sociologist Maria Elena Valenzuela argued, the military state can be interpreted as the quintessential expression of patriarchy: "The Junta, with a very clear sense of its interests, has understood that it must reinforce the traditional family, and the dependent role of women, which is reduced to that of mother. The dictatorship, which institutionalizes social inequality, is founded on inequality in the family." These inequalities began to agitate Chilean women. Women began to formulate groups opposing the patriarchal domination of the political sphere.

=== Michelle Bachelet's presidency ===
Michelle Bachelet was the first female president of Chile, leading the country between 2006 and 2010. During her presidency, Bachelet increased the budget of the National Women's Service (Servicio Nacional de la Mujer, SERNAM) and helped the institution gain funding from the United Nations Development Fund for Women. Her administration had an active role in furthering opportunities and policies for and about women, creating or improving child care, pension reform and breastfeeding laws. During her presidency, Bachelet appointed a cabinet that was 50 percent female.

Bachelet served as the first executive director of United Nations Entity for Gender Equality and the Empowerment of Women.

On March 11, 2014, she became president of Chile for the second time.

=== Policy ===
The National Women's Service (SERNAM) has noticed that it is easier to get politicians to support and pass poverty-alleviation programs aimed at poor women than proposals that challenge gender relations. Much of Chile's legislation concerning women's rights has been pushed by SERNAM: Between 1992 and 2010, sixty-four legislative proposals to expand women's legal equality were introduced by SERNAM.

Historically the progressive parties of the Left have drawn more attention to women's rights. Yet many political parties insincerely support women's agenda and the concept of gender equality, instead leaving any action to be taken by SERNAM or nongovernmental organizations.

Although SERNAM exists to aid women, there is no non-discrimination clause in the Political Constitution of the Republic of Chile.

== Organizations ==
=== State ===
The National Women's Service is the political institution created in 1991 that crafts executive bills concerning women's rights. Its Spanish name is Servicio Nacional de la Mujer, or SERNAM; it has established a program to aid female heads of households, a program for prevention of violence against women, and a network of information centers that focus on the issues of women's rights. Its presence in Chile is important because it was established by law and is a permanent part of Chile's state structure. As an institution it tends to focus much of its attention on certain segments of women: low-income women heads of households, women seasonal workers, domestic violence prevention, and teen pregnancy prevention.

A common complaint that SERNAM has is that the top appointees are not women linked to the feminist community. The institution also has restrictions when it comes to policy regarding women due to its state ties, as seen in 2000 when SERNAM favored but would not explicitly support the bill to legalize divorce because it was under the leadership of the Christian Democratic party. In 2002 it was finally allowed to support the bill.

=== Research and activism ===
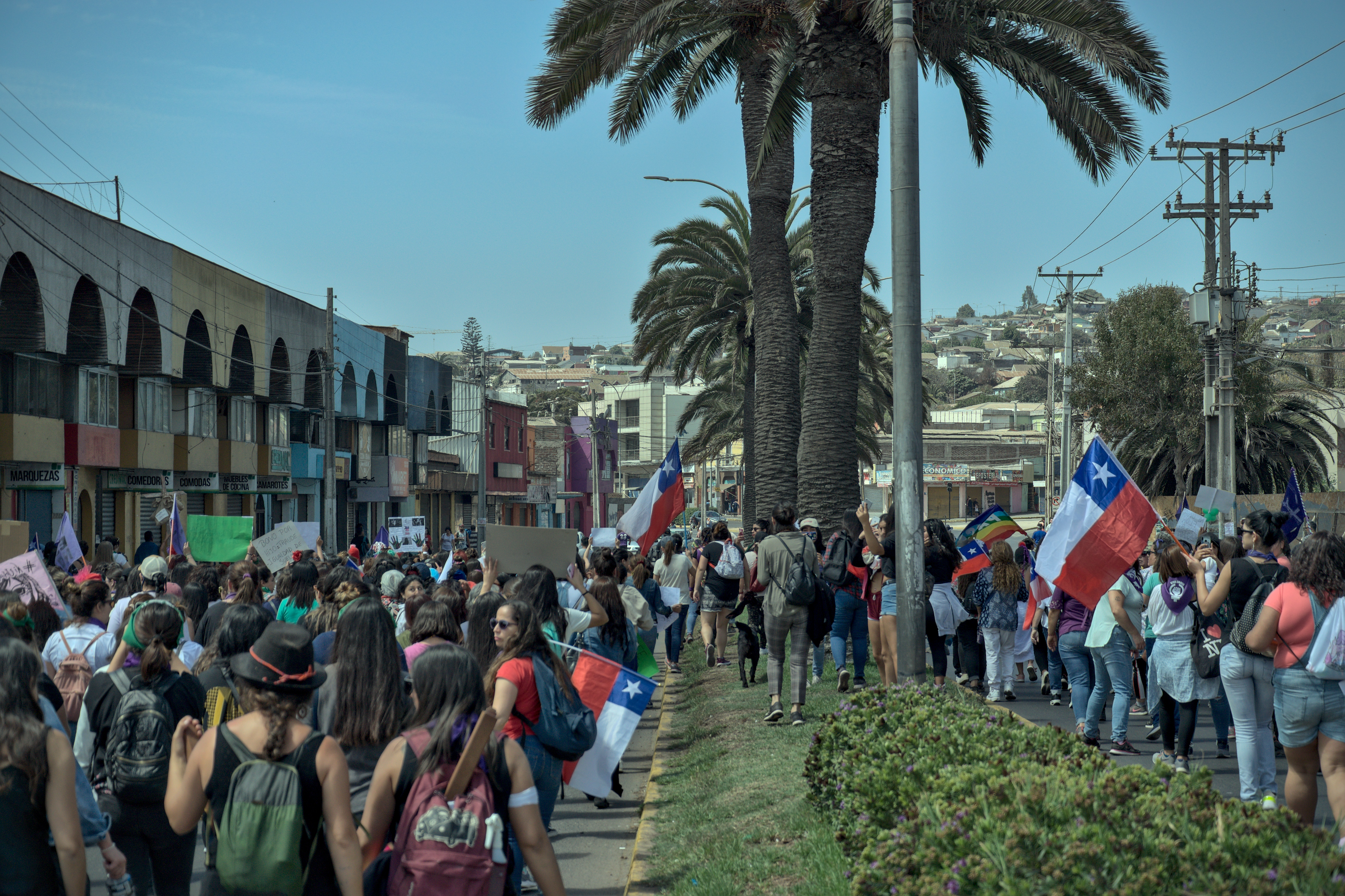
International Women's Day march in San Antonio, Chile

Many of Chile's women's groups function outside the state sphere.

Centers for research began to emerge in the later part of the twentieth century, including the Centro de Estudios de la Mujer (The Women's Study Center) and La Morada. The Women's Study Center is a nonprofit organization founded in 1984 and conducts research, trains women, has a consulting program, and tries to increase women's political participation. La Morada is another nonprofit organization that works to expand the rights of women through political involvement, education, culture, and efforts to eradicate violence. The Juan Fernandez Women's Group is an organisation that works to advocate for women in the remote Juan Fernandez Islands.

Chile's feminist anthem "The rapist is you", went viral in 2019. The chant became an anthem for women during the social unrest of 2019, which was sparked by deepening inequality in the country.

=== International relations ===
Chile ratified the United Nations' Convention on the Elimination of All Forms of Discrimination Against Women in 1988, internationally declaring support for women's human rights.

One of Chile's missions as part of the UN is commitment to democracy, human rights and gender perspective as foundations of multilateral action.

== Crimes against women ==
=== Domestic violence ===
Domestic violence in Chile is a serious issue affecting a large percentage of the population, especially among lower income demographics. The Intrafamily Violence Law passed in 1994 was the first political measure to address violence in the home, but because the law would not pass without being accepted by both sides, the law was weak in the way it addressed victim protection and punishment for abusers. The law was later reformed in 2005. A 2004 SERNAM study reported that 50 percent of married women in Chile had suffered spousal abuse, 34 percent reported having suffered physical violence, and 16 percent reported psychological abuse. According to another study from 2004, 90 percent of low-income women in Chile experience some type of domestic violence. Due to the high prevalence of domestic violence, many Chilean women accept it as normal. The legalization of divorce in 2004 won the approval of women throughout the country, especially those concerned about domestic violence, as women were previously unable to escape abusive relationships due to the divorce laws.

From January to November 2005, 76,000 cases of family violence were reported to the Carabineros; 67,913 were reported by women, 6,404 by men, and approximately 1,000 by children.

=== Rape ===
Rape, including spousal rape, is a criminal offense. Penalties for rape range from five to 15 years' imprisonment, and the government generally enforces the law. In 2004 the Criminal Code was changed so that the age for statutory rape is 14; previously, the age was 12. The law protects the privacy and safety of the person making the charge. In 2006 from January to November, police received reports of 1,926 cases of rape, compared with 2,451 cases in all of 2005; experts believed that most rape cases go unreported. The Ministry of Justice and the PICH have several offices specifically to provide counseling and assistance in rape cases. A number of NGOs, such as La Morada Corporation for Women, provide counseling for rape victims.

=== Sexual harassment ===
A 2005 law against sexual harassment provides protection and financial compensation to victims and penalizes harassment by employers or co-workers. The law provides severance pay to anyone who resigns due to being a victim of sexual harassment if she/he has worked for the employer for at least one year. During 2005 the Labor Directorate received 244 complaints of sexual harassment, and in 2009 there were 82 complaints were received. The majority of the complaints come from women.

=== Discrimination ===
A 2005 study by Corporacion Humana and the University of Chile's Institute of Public Affairs revealed that 87 percent of women surveyed felt that women suffered discrimination. According to the survey, 95 percent believed women faced discrimination in the labor market, 67 percent believed they faced discrimination in politics, 61 percent felt that women were discriminated against by the media, and 54 percent within the family.

== Other concerns ==
=== Family ===
Today, younger women are opting out of marriage and having fewer children than their predecessors. The total fertility rate as of 2015 was 1.82 children born/woman. This is below the replacement rate of 2.1, and also lower than in previous years. A 2002 study reported that urban women averaged 2.1 children per woman, with women living in rural areas having more children, at 2.9. As of the 1990s, both urban and rural women were averaging fewer children than previously. For those women who do have children, after former president Michelle Bachelet's childcare mandates, childcare centers that provide free services are four times more numerous. Nursing mothers also have the legal right to breastfeed during the workday. Women are less likely to seek divorces and marriage annulments.

=== Health and sexuality ===
Women in Chile have long life expectancy, living an average of 80.8 years, about six years longer than men. Sex education is rarely taught in schools and is considered "taboo" by many Chilean families. Friends and family usually are the main source of sex education. In 1994, Chile decriminalized adultery.

==== HIV/AIDS ====
The HIV/AIDS rate in Chile was estimated in 2012 at 0.4% of adults aged 15–49. While cases of HIV and AIDS in women have stabilized internationally, Chile has seen a rise in HIV/AIDS infection. Societal beliefs about traditional women's roles as mothers leads to women being less likely to use contraceptives, increasing the opportunity for disease. Chilean women also often feel subordinate to men due to these traditional belief systems, making women less likely to negotiate for the use of condoms. In 2007, 28 percent of people with HIV/AIDS in Chile were women. Numbers of women living with HIV is lower than those with AIDS. A study by Vivo Positivo showed that 85 percent of women living with HIV/AIDS reported that they had little to no education or information about HIV/AIDS until diagnosis.

A 2004 study found that Chilean women with HIV/AIDS were susceptible to coerced sterilization. Fifty-six percent of HIV-positive Chilean women reported being pressured by health-care workers to prevent pregnancy by being sterilized. Of the women who chose to be sterilized, half were forced or persuaded to do so. Women victims of domestic abuse face a higher risk of getting HIV, and in 2004, 56 percent of women who have HIV and 77 percent of women with HIV/AIDS were victims of domestic abuse, sexual abuse, or rape before their diagnosis.

==== Abortion ====
Between 1989 and 2017, Chile had some of the strictest abortion laws in the world, banning the procedure completely. The current law allows abortion if the mother's life in danger, in case of lethal malformations of the fetus, or in cases of rape.

== Notable Chilean women ==
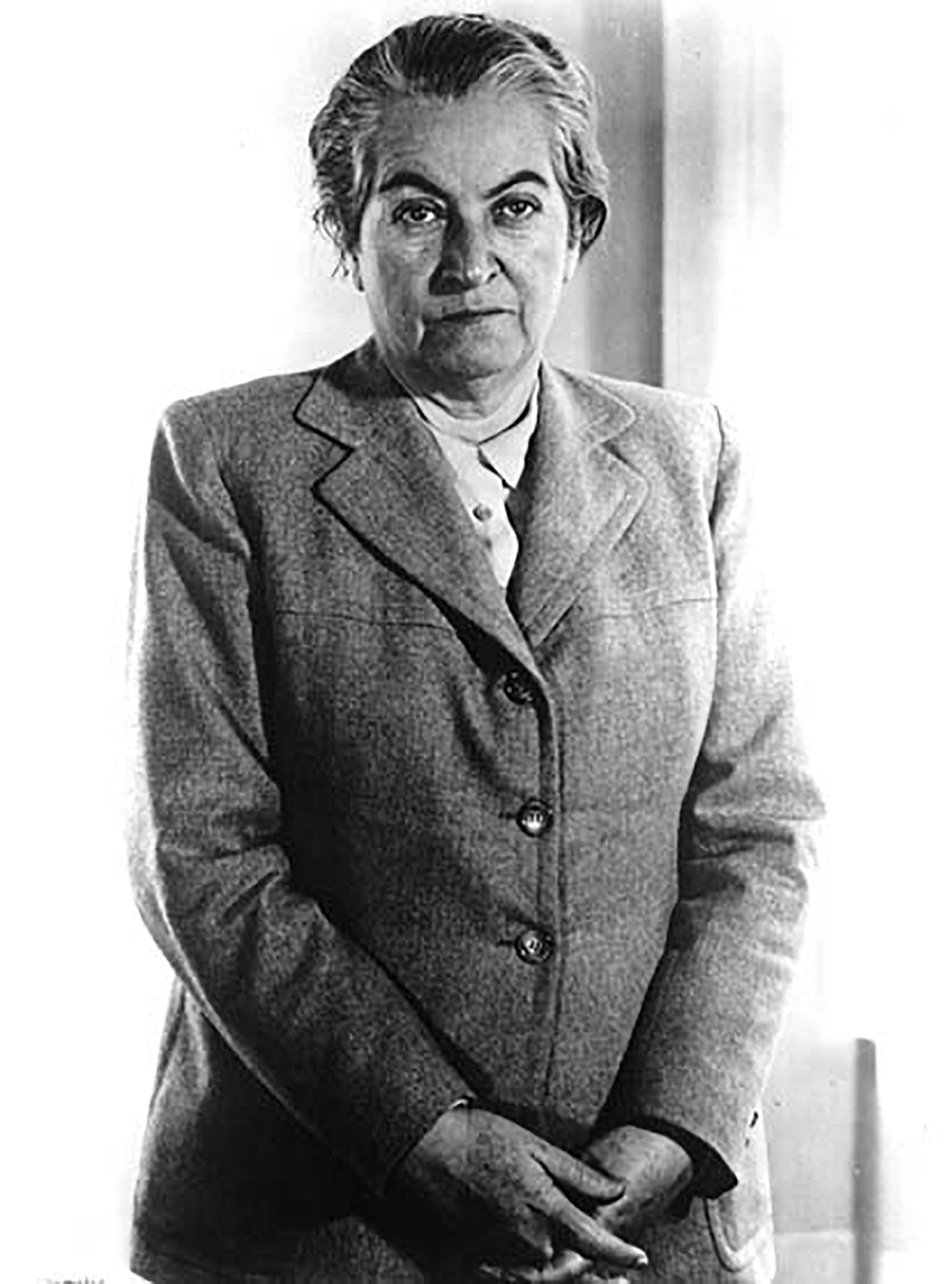
Gabriela Mistral, the first Latin American woman to win a Nobel Prize for Literature.

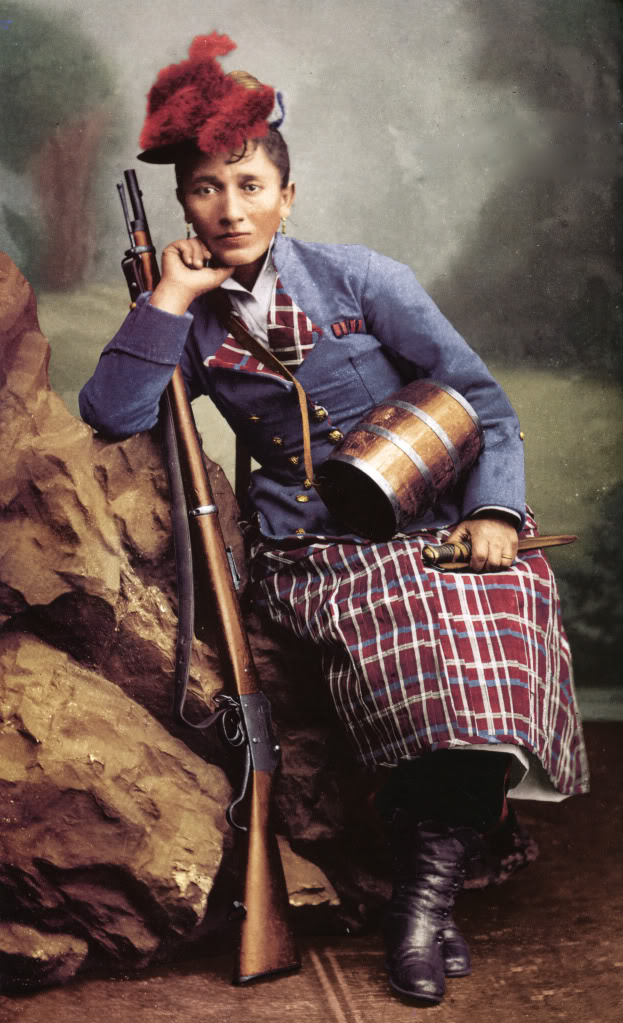
Irene Morales, a soldier during the War of the Pacific who was recognized for her valor.

Literature

Chile has a rich literary history, being described as the "Land of the Poets."

- In 1945, Gabriela Mistral was the first Latin American, including men and women, to win the Nobel Prize for Literature.
- Other notable female authors from Chile include Isabel Allende, Marta Brunet, María Luisa Bombal, Marcela Paz, and Mercedes Valdivieso.

Politics

- In 1999, Gladys Marín was one of the first women to be a presidential candidate in Chile. The year before, she was the first person in Chile to charge Augusto Pinochet for crimes committed during his dictatorship.
- Sara Larraín was the other woman, along with Marín, to be one of the first female presidential candidates in Chile.
- From 2006 until 2010, Michelle Bachelet served as the first woman president of Chile.
- In the 2006 election, Soledad Alvear, a Christian Democrat, ran for the presidency against Bachelet. She is also the woman responsible for organizing and structuring SERNAM.
- The daughter of late President Salvador Allende, Isabel Allende, also second cousin to the author of the same name, is a prominent Chilean politician.
- Senator Carolina Tohá is the president of the Party for Democracy.
- Camila Vallejo has risen in national and international popularity as a leader of the Chilean student movement as well as a member of the Central Committee of Communist Youth of Chile.

Other

- Chile's first canonized saint of the Roman Catholic Church is Teresa de los Andes, a Discalced Carmelite, canonized by Pope John Paul II in 1993.
- Javiera Carrera Verdugo was the first woman to have sewn a national flag of Chile.
- Candelaria Pérez and Irene Morales were cantinières who fought in the War of the Confederation and War of the Pacific, respectively, and were recognized for their courage in battle.
- Margot Duhalde was the first female war pilot from Chile, having flown for the Air Transport Auxiliary of the Royal Air Force in World War II.

== See also ==
- Prostitution in Chile
- Michelle Bachelet
- Gabriela Mistral
- Chilean Civil Code
- National Women's Service
- History of Chile
- Politics of Chile
- List of Chile-related topics
