= South Kivu =

Province of the Democratic Republic of the Congo

South Kivu: Province du Sud-Kivu (French); Jimbo la Kivu Kusini (Swahili)
- Province
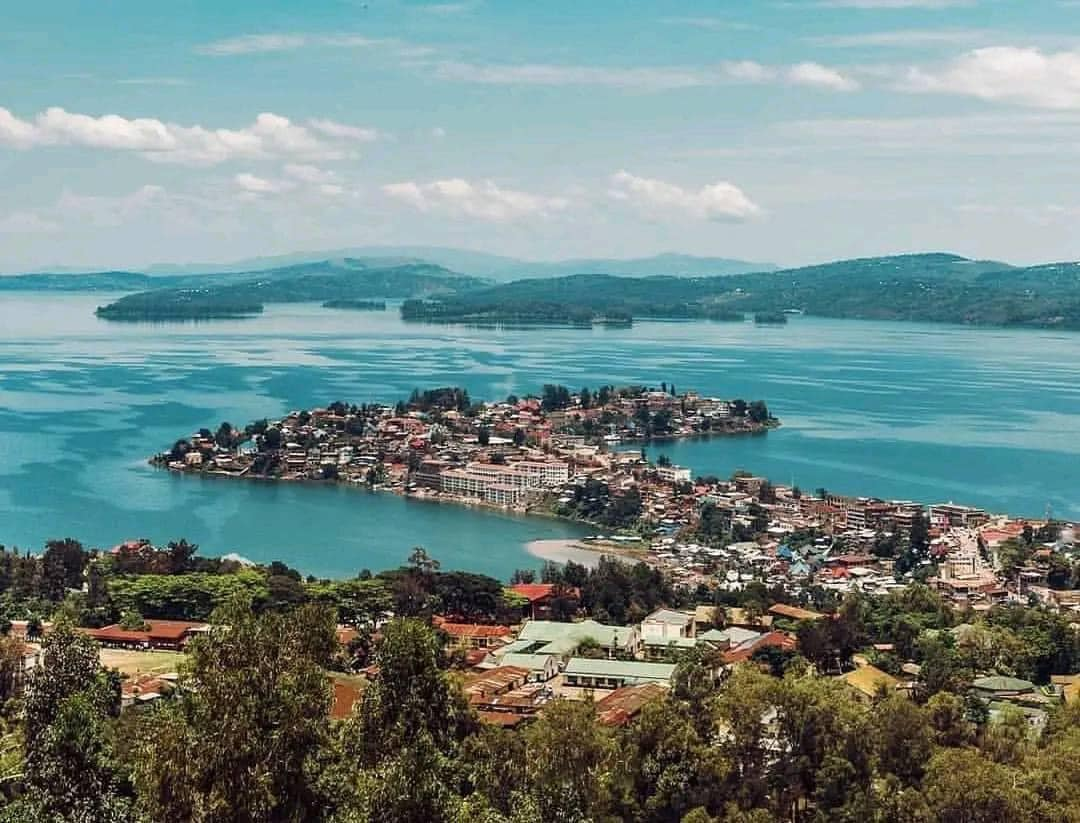
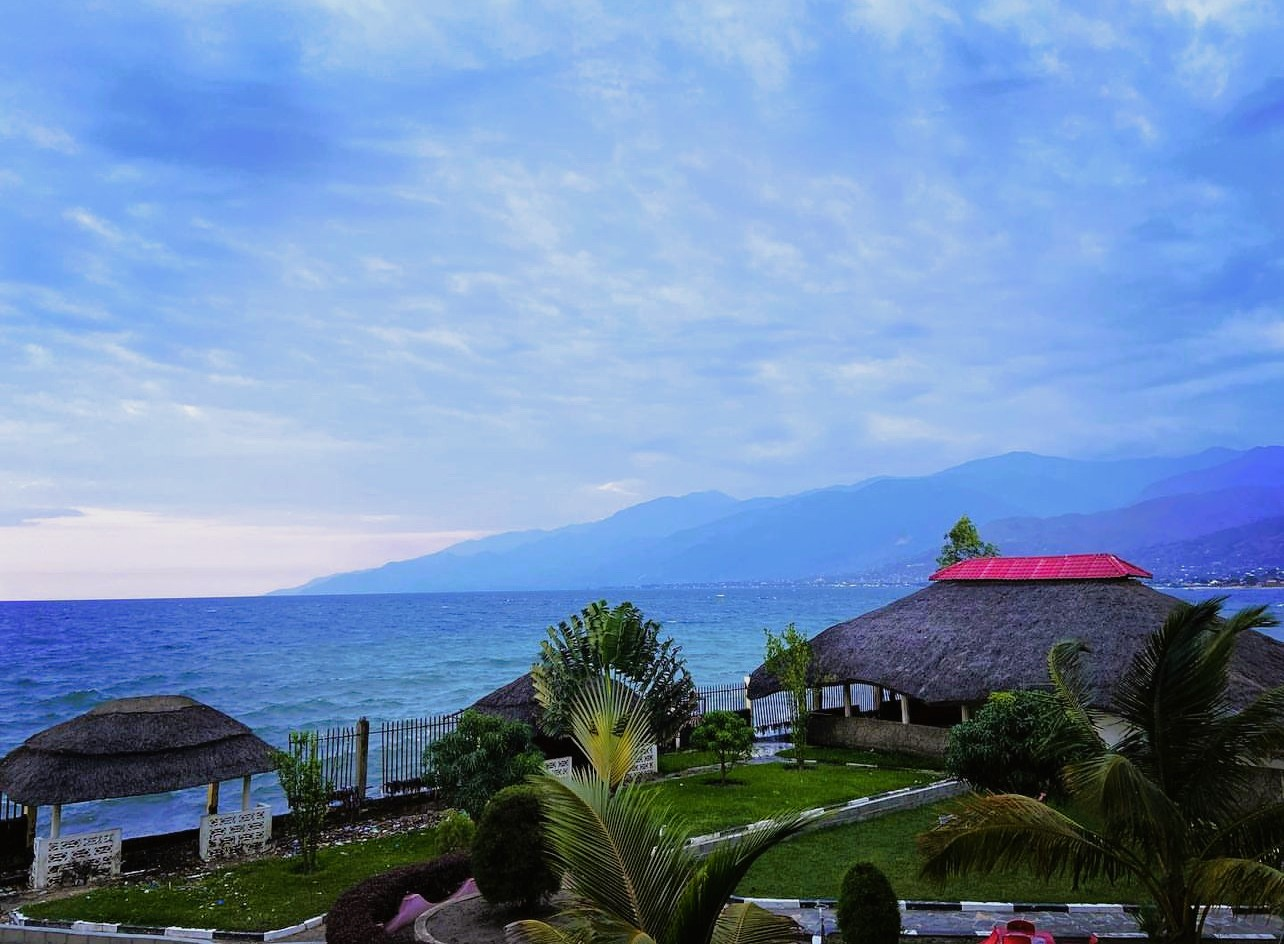
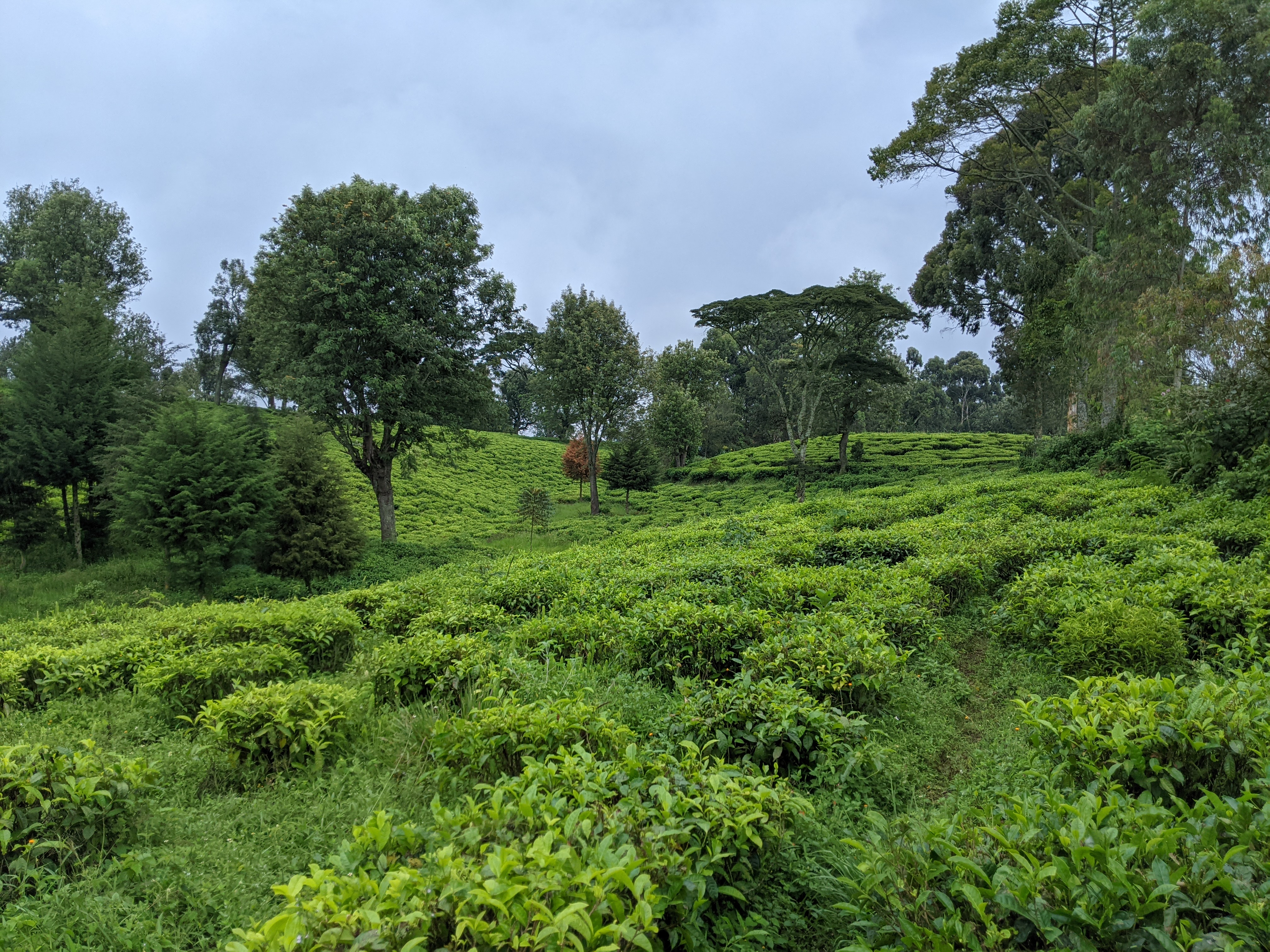
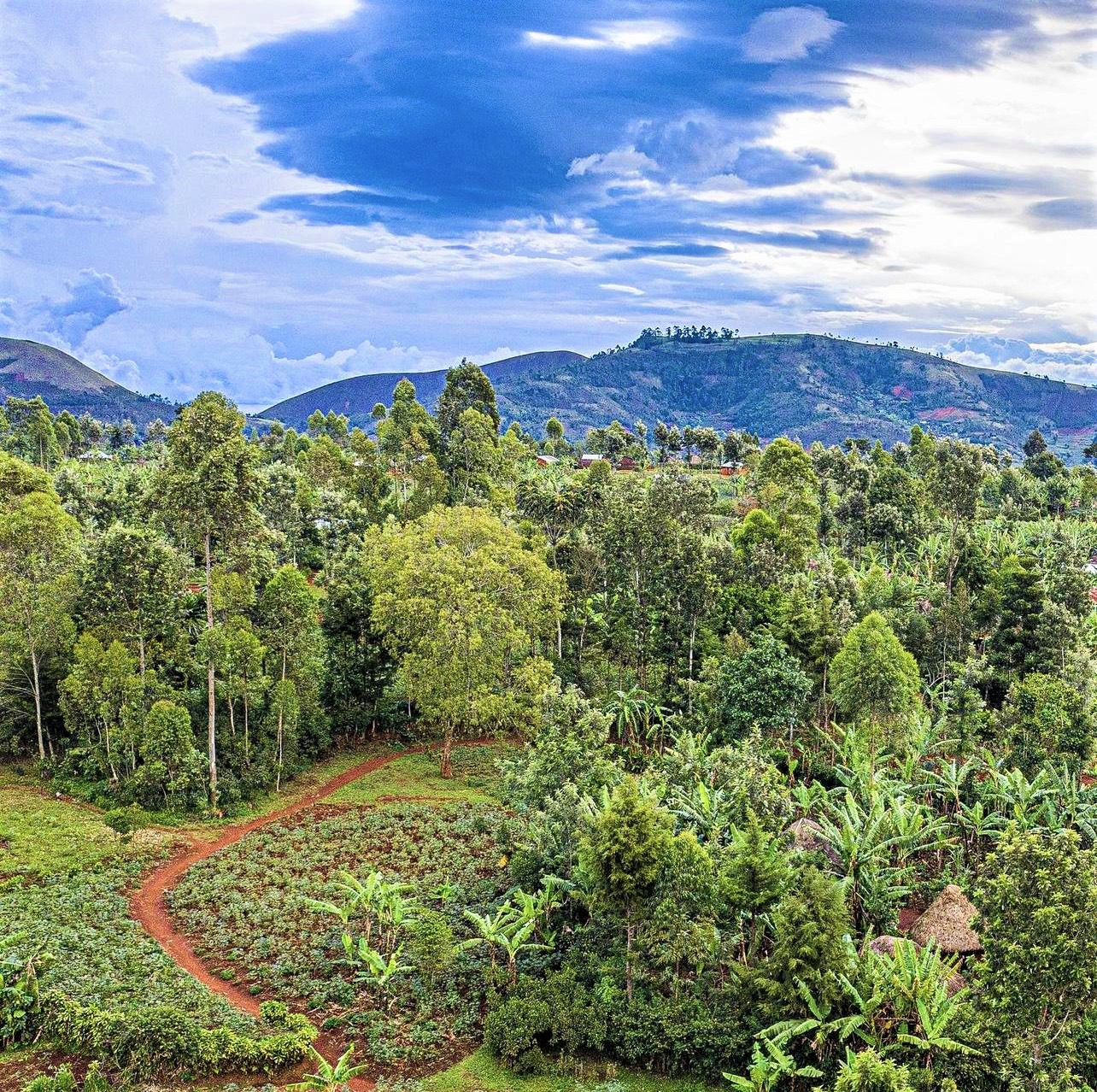
- From Top left to right: Lakeside view of the provincial capital Bukavu; view of Lake Tanganyika from Uvira; Kahuzi-Biéga National Park; and a view of the Ngweshe Chiefdom

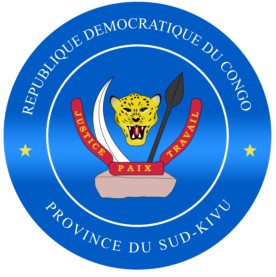
- Seal

- South Kivu
- Interactive map of South Kivu Province in the Democratic Republic of the Congo
- Country: Democratic Republic of the Congo
- Named for: Lake Kivu
- Capital: Bukavu (de jure); Uvira (de facto)

Government
  - Body: Provincial Assembly of South Kivu
  - Governor: Jean Jacques Purusi
  - Deputy Governor: Jean Elekano

Area
  - Total: 64,791 km^{2} (25,016 sq mi)
  - Rank: 17th

Population (2021)
  - Total: 9,860,637
  - Rank: 3rd
  - Density: 152.19/km^{2} (394.17/sq mi)

Ethnic groups
  - Native: Bashi, Barega, Banyindu, Babembe, Bazimba, Babuyu, Batembo, Bafuliiru, Bavira, Barongeronge, Pygmies, Babwari, Wagoma
  - Settler: Congolese Banyarwanda and Barundi
- License Plate Code: (Democratic Republic of the Congo) CGO / 22
- Official language: French
- National language: Swahili
- HDI (2023): 0.532low
- Website: www.sudkivu.cd

South Kivu (Swahili: Jimbo la Kivu Kusini; French: Sud-Kivu) is one of 26 provinces of the Democratic Republic of the Congo. Its capital is Bukavu. Located within the East African Rift's western branch Albertine Rift, it is bordered to the east by Lake Kivu, Rwanda, Burundi, and Tanzania; to the west by Maniema; to the north by North Kivu; and the south by Tanganyika. The province covers an area of approximately 64,791 square kilometers and has an estimated population of 9,860,637 as of 2021.

The province has historically been inhabited by various Bantu-speaking ethnic groups, including the Bashi, Bafuliiru, Banyindu, Bazoba, Babembe, Babuyu, Balega, Babwari, Baholoholo, Banyanga, Bavira, Bakusu, Batembo, Barongeronge, and Baswaga, as well as Pygmy ethnic groups. During the colonial period, the borders of the Congo Free State were established by the 1885 Berlin Conference, placing all of Lake Kivu and both banks of the Ruzizi River within the Free State. The region's boundaries were later subject to disputes, including the Kivu frontier incident of 1909, which was resolved in 1910 when the eastern portion of Kivu was allocated to Uganda Protectorate and German East Africa. Kivu District was formally created in 1912 and later divided into Sud-Kivu and Nord-Kivu Districts in 1951. After a series of administrative reorganizations, South Kivu became a separate province in 1988, alongside North Kivu and Maniema.

South Kivu is administratively divided into eight territories: Fizi, Idjwi, Kabare, Kalehe, Mwenga, Shabunda, Uvira, and Walungu, which are subdivided into 18 chiefdoms and five sectors. The province has four officially recognized cities: Bukavu, Uvira, Baraka, and Kamituga. Its economy is primarily based on agriculture, livestock farming, trade, and services. Significant natural and cultural landmarks include the Kahuzi-Biéga National Park and Itombwe Nature Reserve, both designated UNESCO World Heritage Sites, as well as Idjwi Island, Lake Kivu beaches, and Kavumu Airport.

Since the First Congo War (1996–1997), South Kivu has experienced persistent armed conflict and instability, particularly during the Second Congo War (1998–2003). The province has been a battleground for various armed groups, including the Alliance of Democratic Forces for the Liberation of Congo-Zaire (AFDL), the Rwandan Patriotic Army (RPA), Congolese Rally for Democracy (RCD), Mai-Mai local community-based militias as well as March M23 Movement (M23), RED-Tabara, Twirwaneho, Ngumino, and Android. Ongoing insecurity, fueled by competition over natural resources has led to widespread human rights abuses, displacement of civilians, and humanitarian crises.

== Geography ==
=== Relief, geology and geomorphology ===
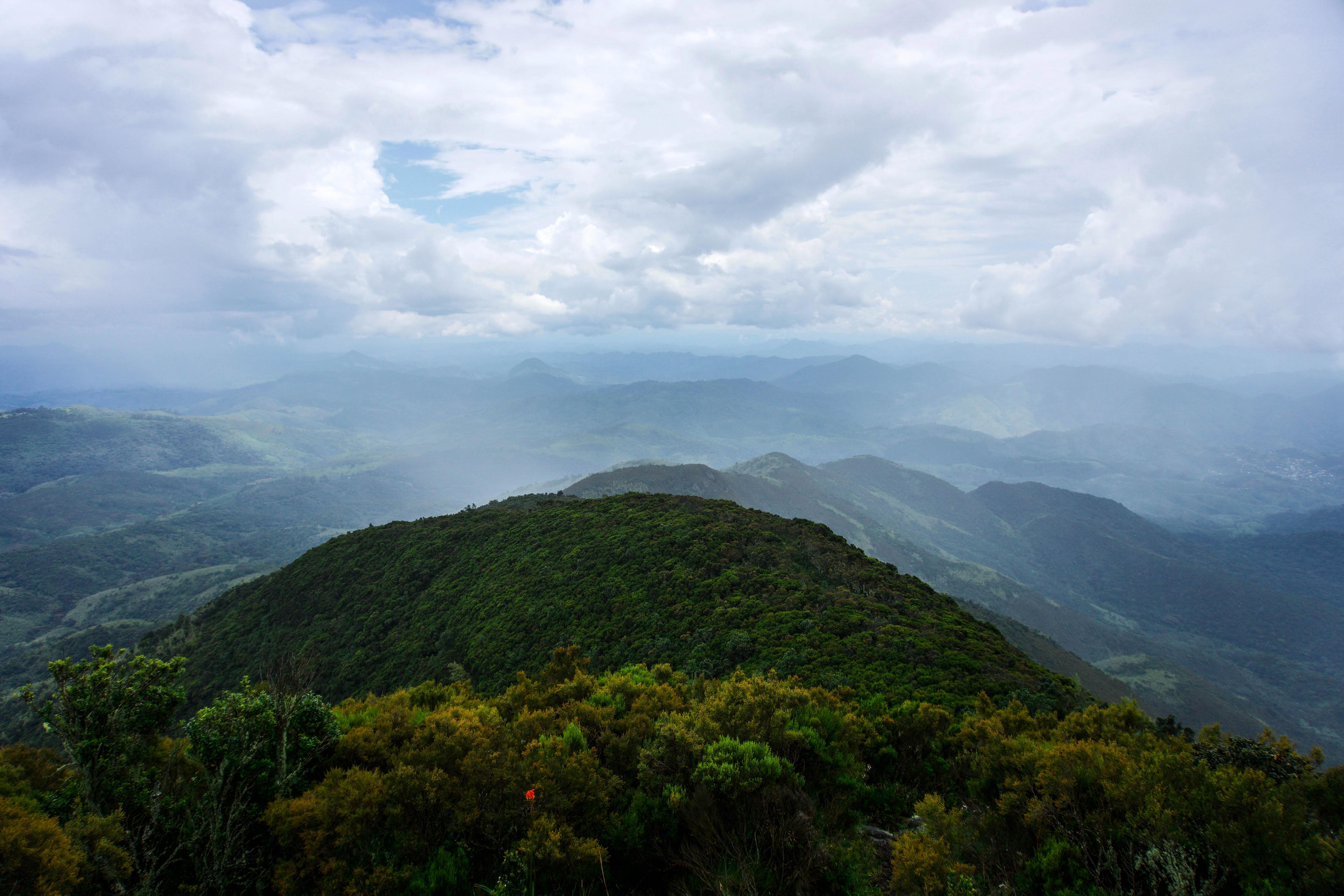
Mitumba Mountains

South Kivu's topography varied, with the eastern region dominated by the Mitumba mountain range, which often rises above 3,000 meters in elevation. The central and western parts of the province are marked by high and low plateaus, respectively. The eastern highlands form part of the Albertine Rift, a geological depression that includes Lake Kivu and Lake Tanganyika.

The province's geology is divided into three main groups: basement terrains, volcanic terrains, and cover terrains. The basement terrains, primarily found in the western and central parts of the province, date back to the Middle Carboniferous period. These areas, which make up more than 70% of the province, are rich in minerals. Volcanic terrains near Bukavu are dominated by basaltic rocks and ancient lava flows, particularly in the National INERA-Mulungu region.

Sedimentary basins such as the Lake Kivu–Ruzizi Plain Basin contain mineral-rich deposits, including gold, columbite-tantalite, diamonds, wolframite, tin, monazite, limestone, cassiterite, methane gas, and thermal waters. Soil types vary across the province. Kabare Territory, Idjwi Territory, and Walungu Territory have predominantly clayey soils that are increasingly affected by erosion and population pressure. Idjwi Territory retains fertile agricultural land, although population pressure has made arable land increasingly scarce. Kalehe Territory has predominantly clayey soils and contains small gold deposits. Shabunda Territory, Mwenga Territory, and Fizi Territory have sandy soils that support agriculture and contain significant mineral resources, including tin, gold, cassiterite, and columbite-tantalite. Uvira Territory has sandy soils suitable for rice and cotton cultivation, while its high plateaus also support livestock farming because of their mild climate.

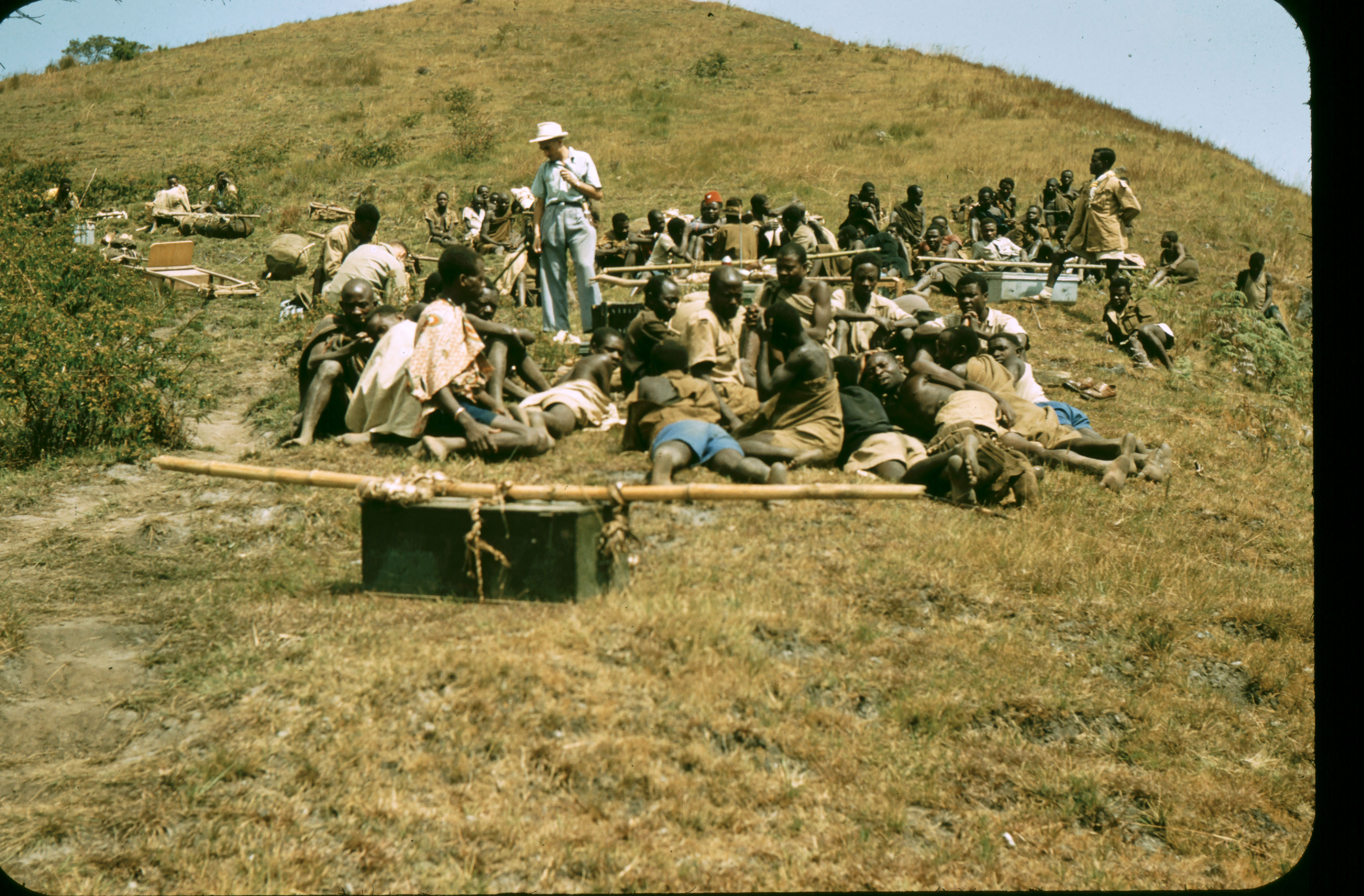
A caravan of travelers and livestock rests on the slope of Mount Mohi in South Kivu in 1947.

The landforms reflect the province's geological history, particularly major phases of faulting and volcanism. Successive fault lines create a stepped or terraced landscape. In Bukavu, three nearly north–south-oriented faults cross the city and create steep and irregular terrain that complicates movement and road construction. Roads consequently often follow curved or winding routes to adapt to the steep slopes. Similar escarpment landscapes occur along the routes from Ngoma toward Kamanyola, Mizangala (meaning "Be on your guard" in French) toward Kitutu, Nyafunze toward Kaziba Chiefdom, Nyamukunamwa toward Ciherano, and Nakandongo toward Lemera. Elsewhere in South Kivu, fault-related terraces extend across several dozen kilometers at different elevations, forming low, middle, and high plateaus. Elevations range from approximately 773 m at Lake Tanganyika to 3,475 m at Mount Mohi, the highest peak in South Kivu. In the lowlands, gentle river gradients promote flooding and sediment deposition, particularly along meandering rivers with shifting channels and oxbow lakes. Erosion also varies with rock type and degree of weathering.

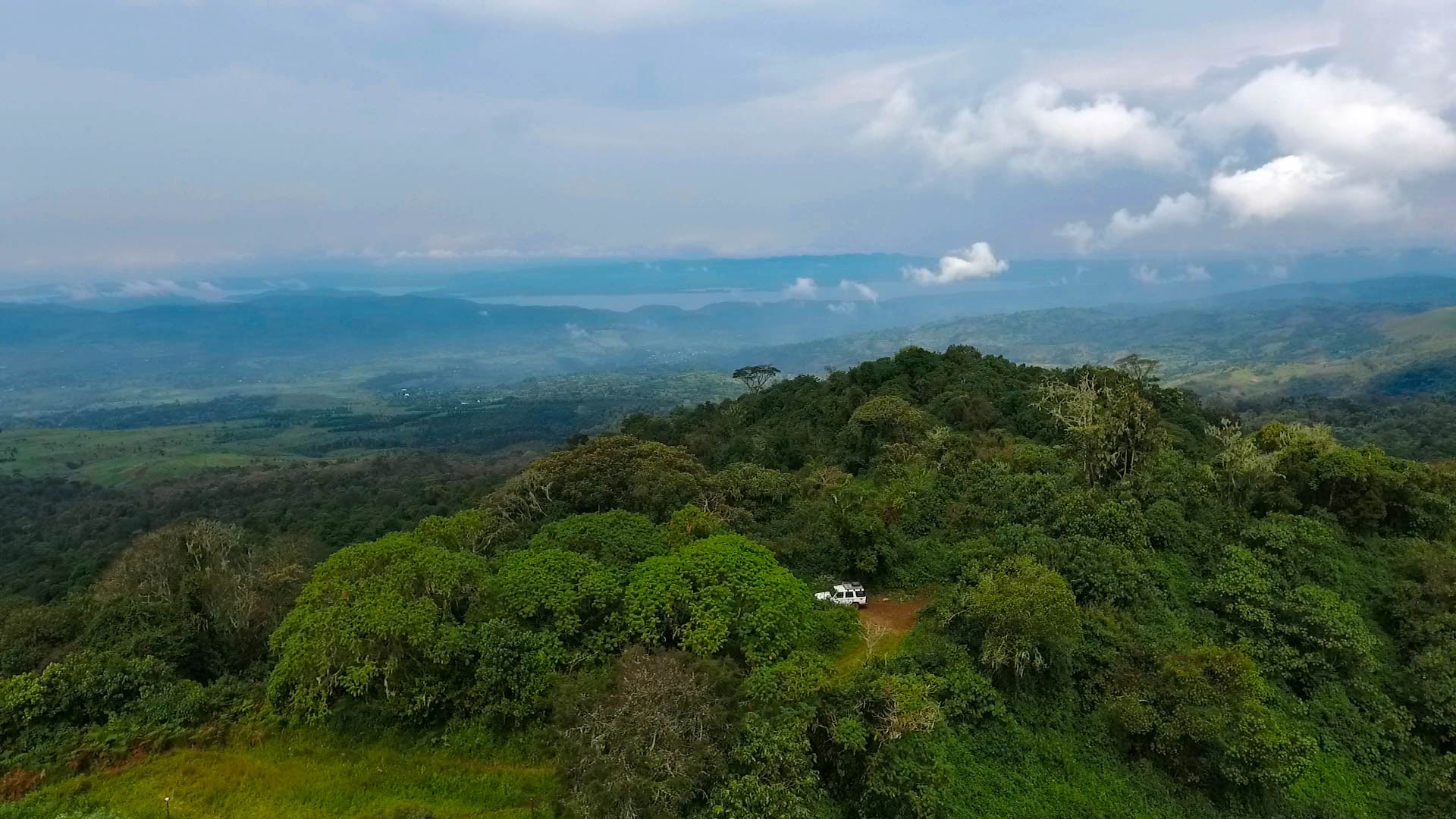
Kahuzi-Biéga National Park

Hard-rock outcrops are susceptible to rockfalls, particularly on steep slopes and during earthquakes. Basaltic outcrops are also characterized by extensive clay formation (montmorillonite–kaolinite) and may be unstable where red paleosols occur. These red clay layers contain impermeable horizons that occur along hillsides and can support perched groundwater. Such conditions increase the susceptibility of the terrain to mass movements, including landslides, mudflows, and rockfalls, as well as ravine formation. These erosional processes are particularly evident along river channels, where deep incision modifies their longitudinal and cross-sectional profiles. Surface runoff within these drainage basins also contributes to the formation of convex hillslopes. IRD slope classifications, based on topographic analysis and weighted mean transverse and longitudinal slopes, help identify the dominant landforms. According to Jean Omasombo Tshonda et al., the region's extensive river network suggests that erosion by surface runoff progressively transforms South Kivu's landscape from one characterized by volcanic formations and fault-related structures, such as horsts and grabens, toward predominantly hilly terrain.

In mountainous areas, intense vertical erosion causes rivers to incise their channels, forming narrow, canyon-shaped valleys characteristic of youthful landscapes and destabilizing adjacent slopes, which can promote deep-seated mass movements. Plains dominated by lateral erosion commonly contain broad, flat-bottomed valleys, where rivers may migrate across accumulated sediments and form meandering or anastomosing channels. These characteristics are traditionally associated with more mature stages of fluvial landscape development. Floodplain areas are often highly fertile but are also vulnerable to flooding.

=== Climate ===
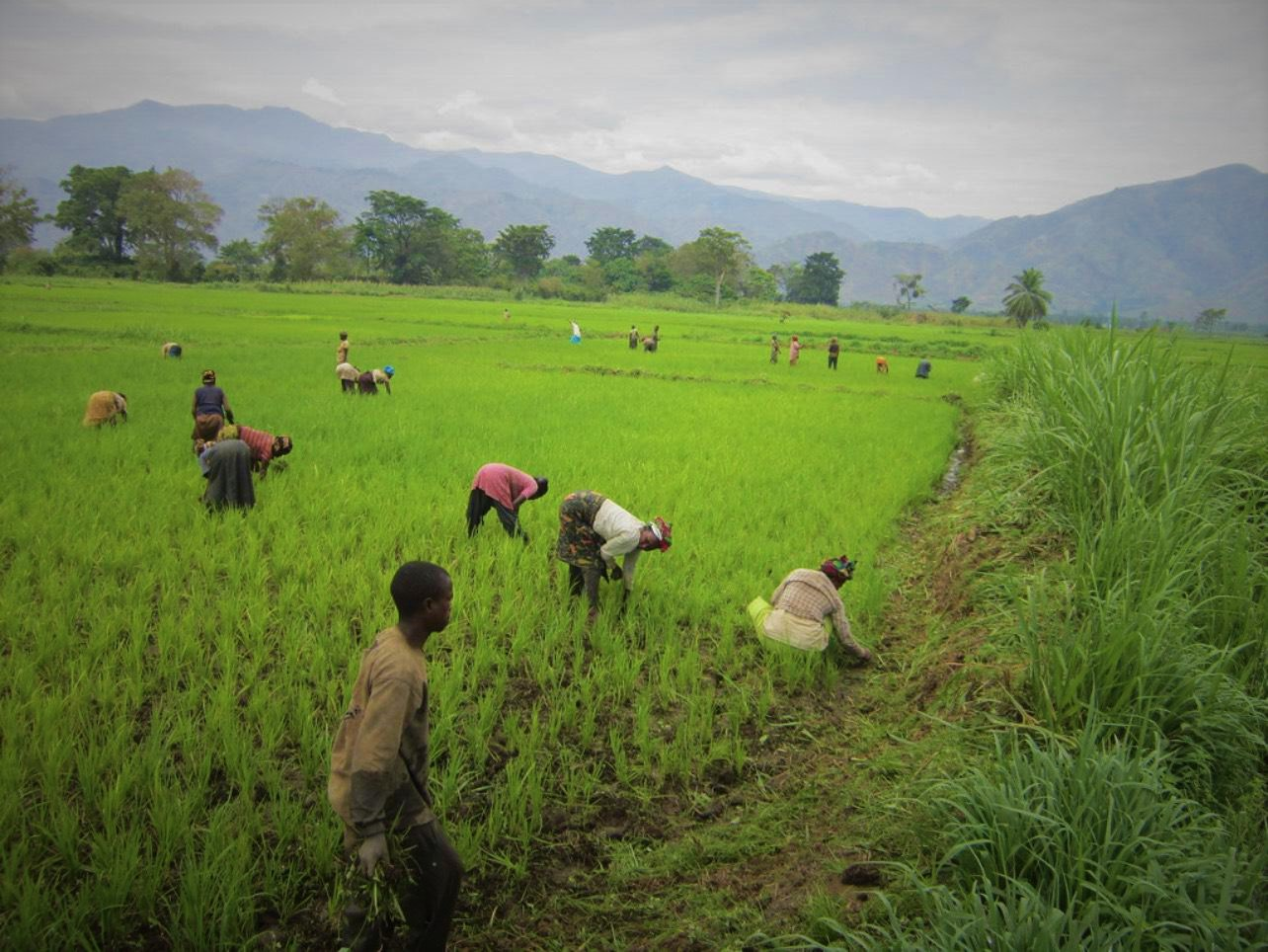
Rice farming in the Ruzizi Plain

South Kivu lies within equatorial latitudes, but its high and varied relief produces substantial climatic differences across the province. Elevation ranges from about 700 m in the Ruzizi Plain to more than 3,400 m in the highest mountains. Assuming a temperature decrease of approximately 6°C per 1,000 m of elevation, the mean annual temperatures of 24–25°C recorded at low-elevation stations such as Kamanyola, Sange, Lubarika, Luvungi, Uvira, and Baraka imply much lower temperatures at higher elevations. At elevations above 2,700 m, mean annual temperatures may therefore fall within roughly 10–20°C.

Despite the province's equatorial location, this elevation-driven cooling creates temperate highland environments and distinct altitudinal vegetation zones. These conditions contribute to the province's high biodiversity, particularly in the Itombwe Nature Reserve and Kahuzi-Biéga National Park.

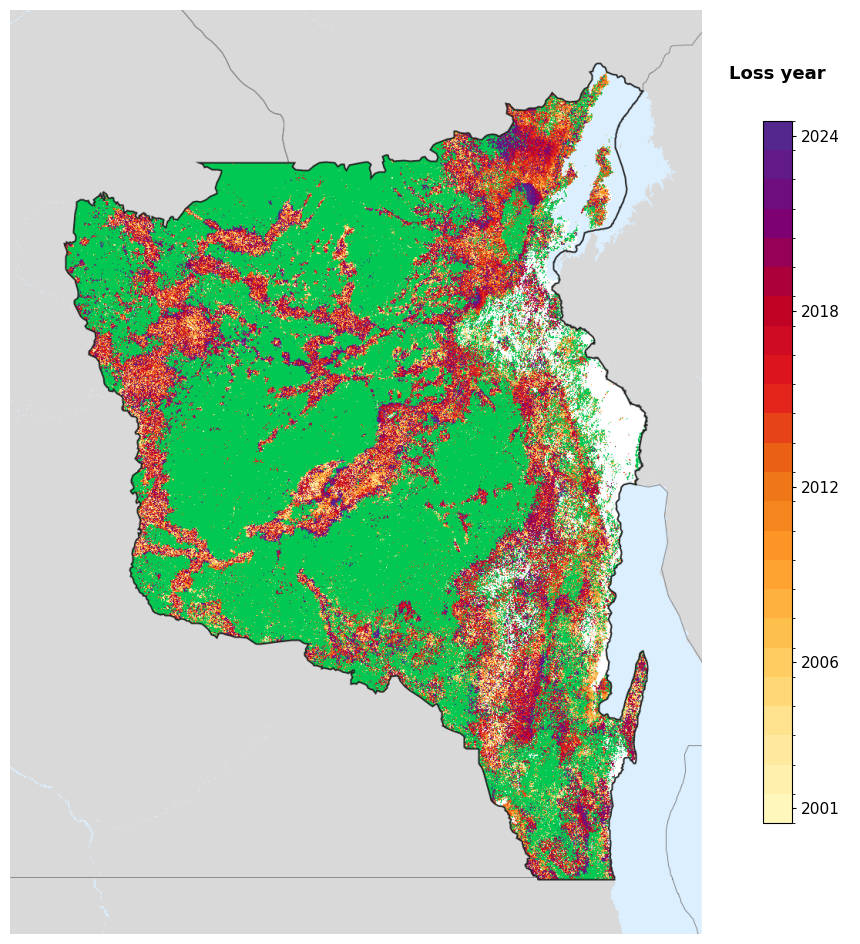
Tree-cover loss year in South Kivu, 2001–2024, from the Global Forest Change dataset.

The mountainous eastern region, including Bukavu, has a cool highland climate, with temperatures decreasing with elevation. Higher areas, including the Minembwe, Mulenge, Kalonge, and Kahuzi-Biéga highlands, support distinct altitudinal vegetation belts, including mountain grasslands. The eastern part of the province generally experiences a seasonal cycle consisting of a dry season from June to September and a longer rainy season. During the dry season, temperatures are relatively high and rainfall is limited. The central and western parts of South Kivu, particularly Shabunda Territory, Mwenga Territory, and Fizi Territory, have tropical rainforest climates characterized by dense forests and abundant rainfall throughout the year. The Ruzizi Plain has a relatively dry tropical climate, receiving approximately 1,000 mm of rainfall annually.

Environmental degradation, including deforestation and increasing population pressure, has also affected local environmental conditions. In Uvira, particularly in the lower-elevation areas, declining rainfall and rising temperatures have been reported alongside environmental degradation. Vegetation in the lower and drier areas includes grassland and thorny savanna, whereas the wetter and higher-elevation areas support forests and mountain vegetation.

=== Hydrology ===
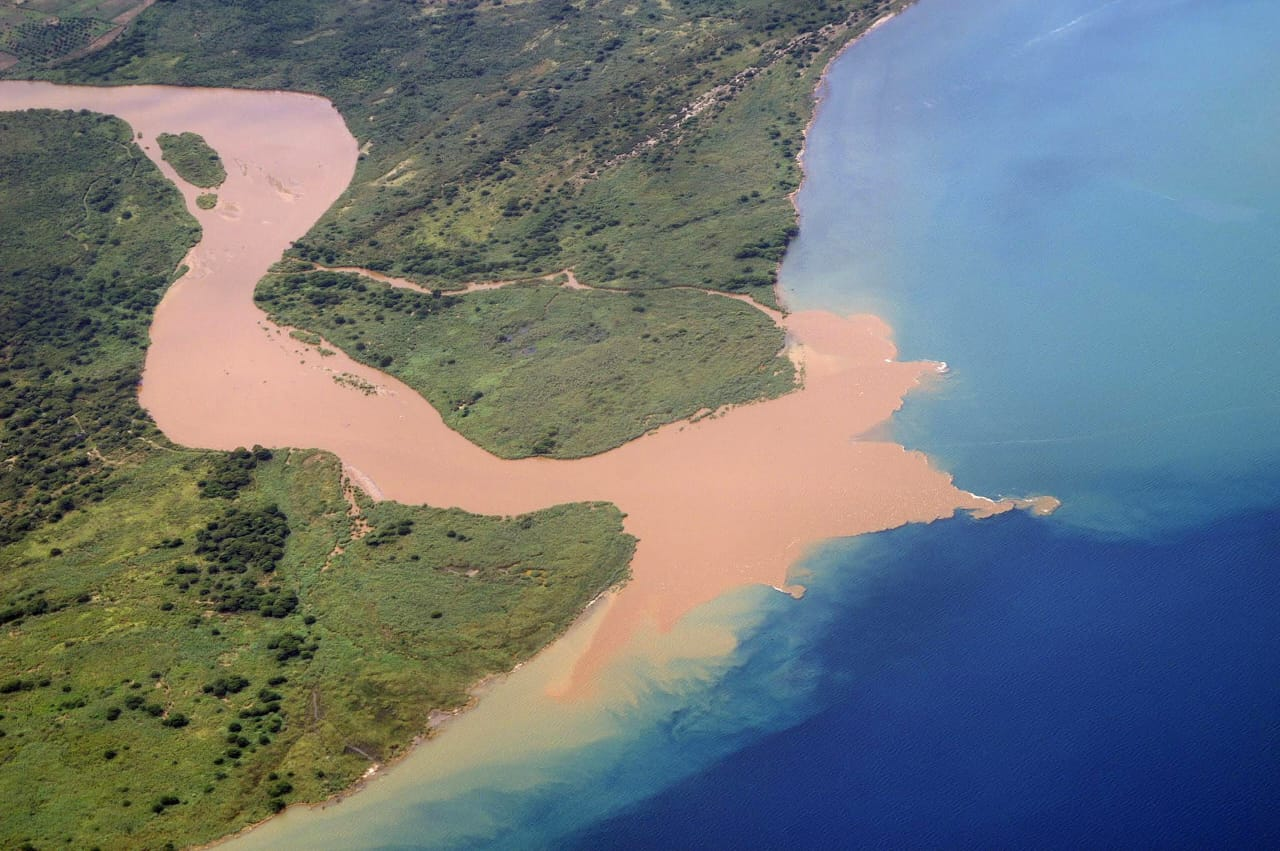
Ruzizi River flowing into Lake Tanganyika

South Kivu has two main drainage systems. The first is found in the east, where the Kivu–Tanganyika region is made up of Lakes Kivu and Tanganyika, connected by the Ruzizi River. Almost 100 rivers flow into these lakes from west to east. Most of them are relatively small, with main channels of less than 20 km and drainage basins of under 15 km^{2}. They are generally second- or third-order rivers, with 2–10 tributaries and relatively low discharge. Approximately ten rivers have main channels longer than 50 km, although few exceed 100 km. From north to south, the principal rivers of the interlake region are the Nyabarongo, Lwiro, Ruzizi, Luvimvi, Luvubu, Luberizi, Sange, Runingu, Kiliba, Kavimvira, Mulongwe, Kalimabenge, Mutambala, and Nemba.

In western South Kivu, three major rivers: the Lugulu, Ulindi, and Elila, flow from east to west. In the north, the Lugulu River extends for more than 255 km and receives tributaries from North Kivu. In the central region, the Ulindi River extends for more than 385 km, has a drainage basin of 30,240 km^{2}, and a discharge ranging from 300 to 1,700 m^{3}/s. In the south, the Elila River is approximately 235 km long, drains 27,360 km^{2}, and has a discharge ranging from 200 to 1,400 m^{3}/s.

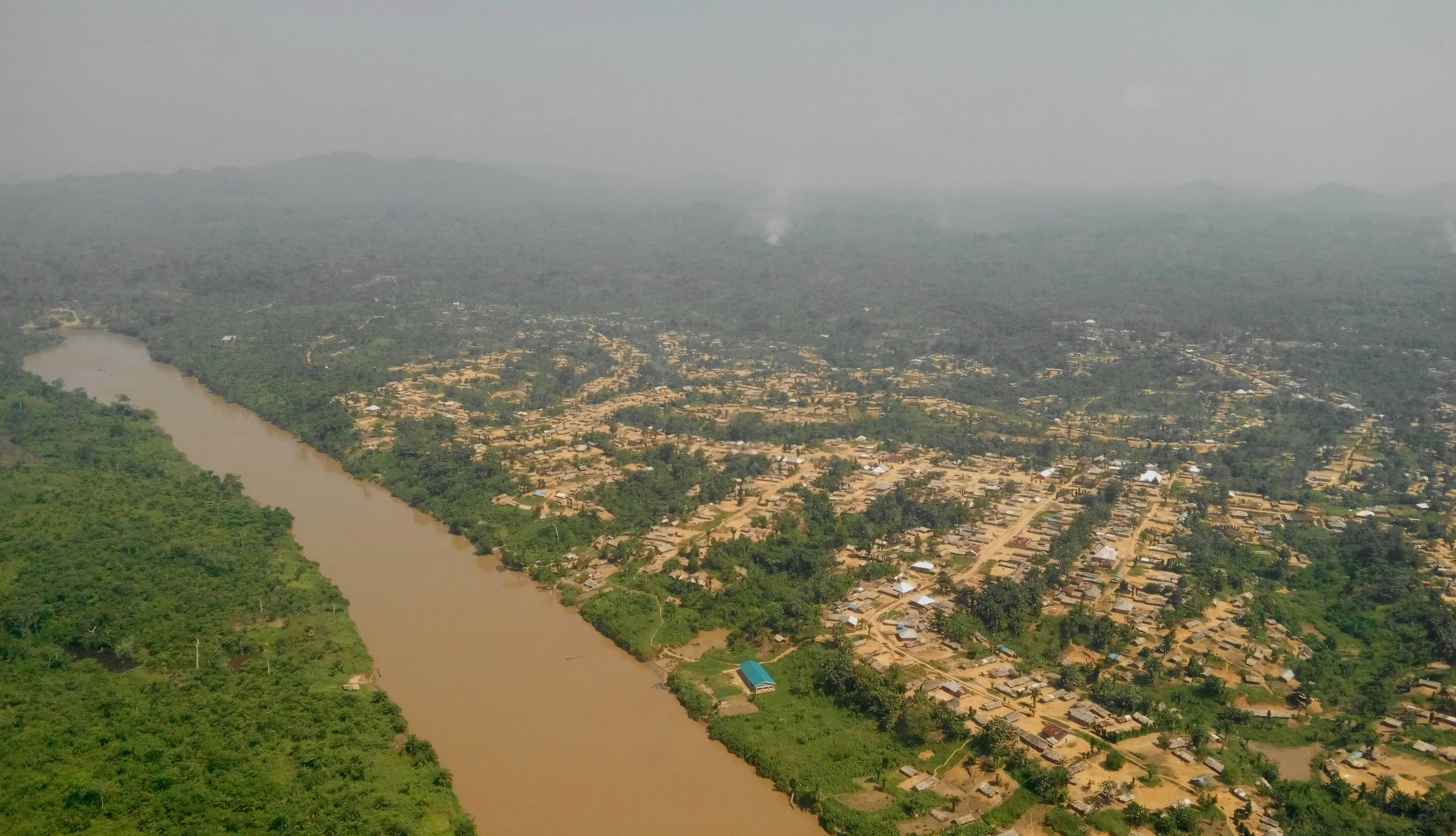
Ulindi River

Because these drainage basins extend into neighboring provinces, their areas within South Kivu are considerably smaller: 11,069.52 km^{2} for the Lugulu, 10,020.39 km^{2} for the Ulindi, 9,983.93 km^{2} for the Elila, and 9,450.66 km^{2} for the remaining rivers, including the Kama, Lwama, Magembe, Bipalo, Ikandja, Lumbwe, Lwiko, Mutshombwe, and Kilombwe. Together, these river basins cover 40,524.66 km^{2}, equivalent to 63.56% of the total area of South Kivu. Although Lakes Kivu and Tanganyika are prominent geographical features, lake areas account for only 36.44% of the province's total surface area, which, according to Jean Omasombo Tshonda et al., indicates the greater role of rivers than lakes in the province's hydrography. The major rivers and their numerous higher-order tributaries flow hundreds of kilometers westward as part of the Congo River drainage system before eventually joining the Lualaba River upstream of Kisangani.

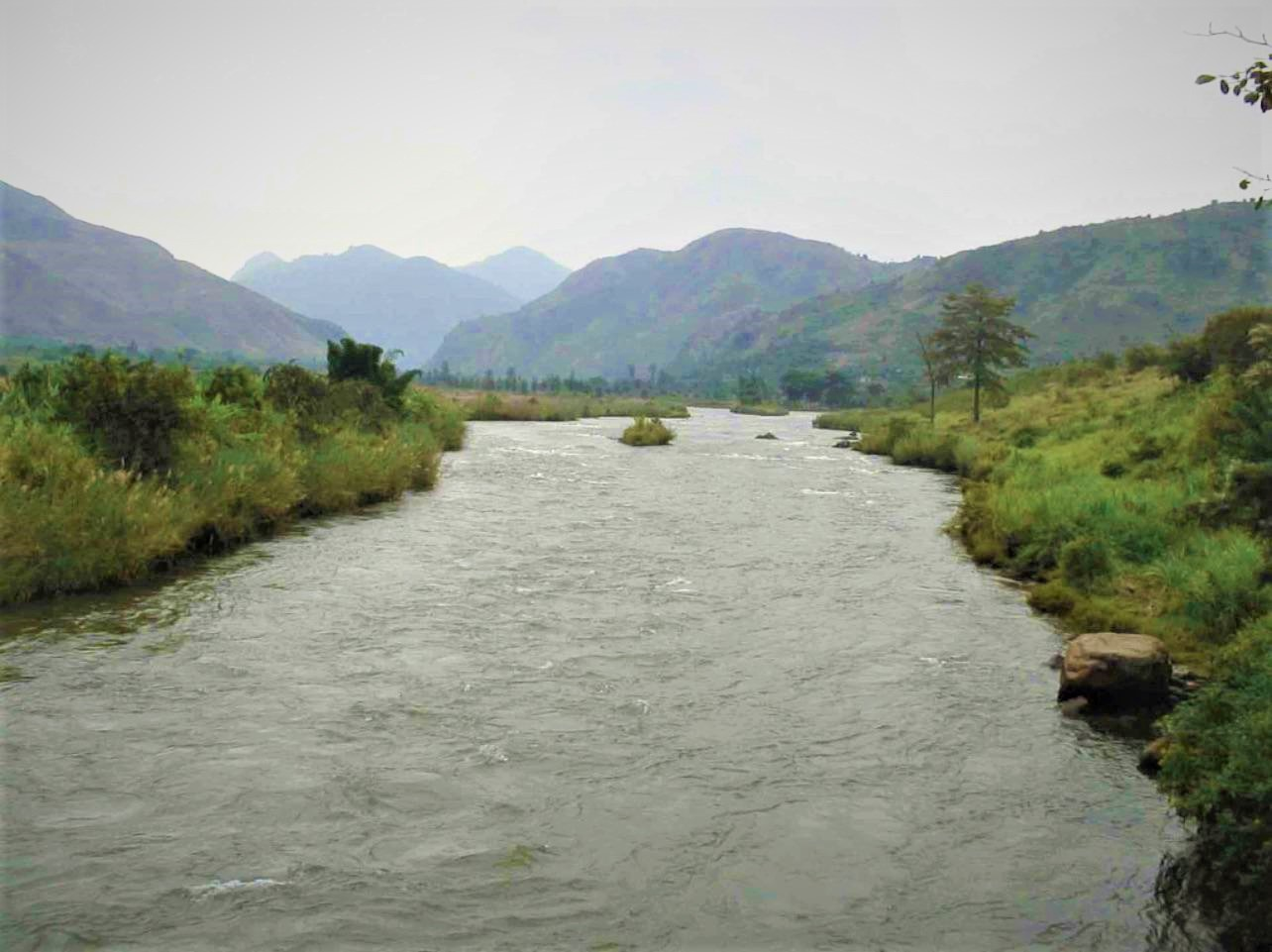
Ruzizi River

South Kivu hosts four hydroelectric power stations, such as Ruzizi I, Ruzizi II, Kyimbi (Bendera), and Mungombe, while the Magembe micro-power plant in Fizi Territory remains inoperative. South Kivu also has considerable petroleum reserves, with oil deposits identified along the western littoral of Lake Kivu, within its subaqueous substratum, and across the Ruzizi Plain and Lake Tanganyika. Ongoing exploratory endeavors are being undertaken in Katanga, particularly at the confluence of the Mutambala River in Baraka, alongside similar research in Karamba, near the Nemba River, where bituminous hydrocarbon residues containing an 80% carbon composition have been extracted since 2020. Peat deposits are similarly exploited in multiple locales, including Kakonda (Kabare Territory) and Nyangezi, Chiherano, and Kachandja (Walungu Territory).

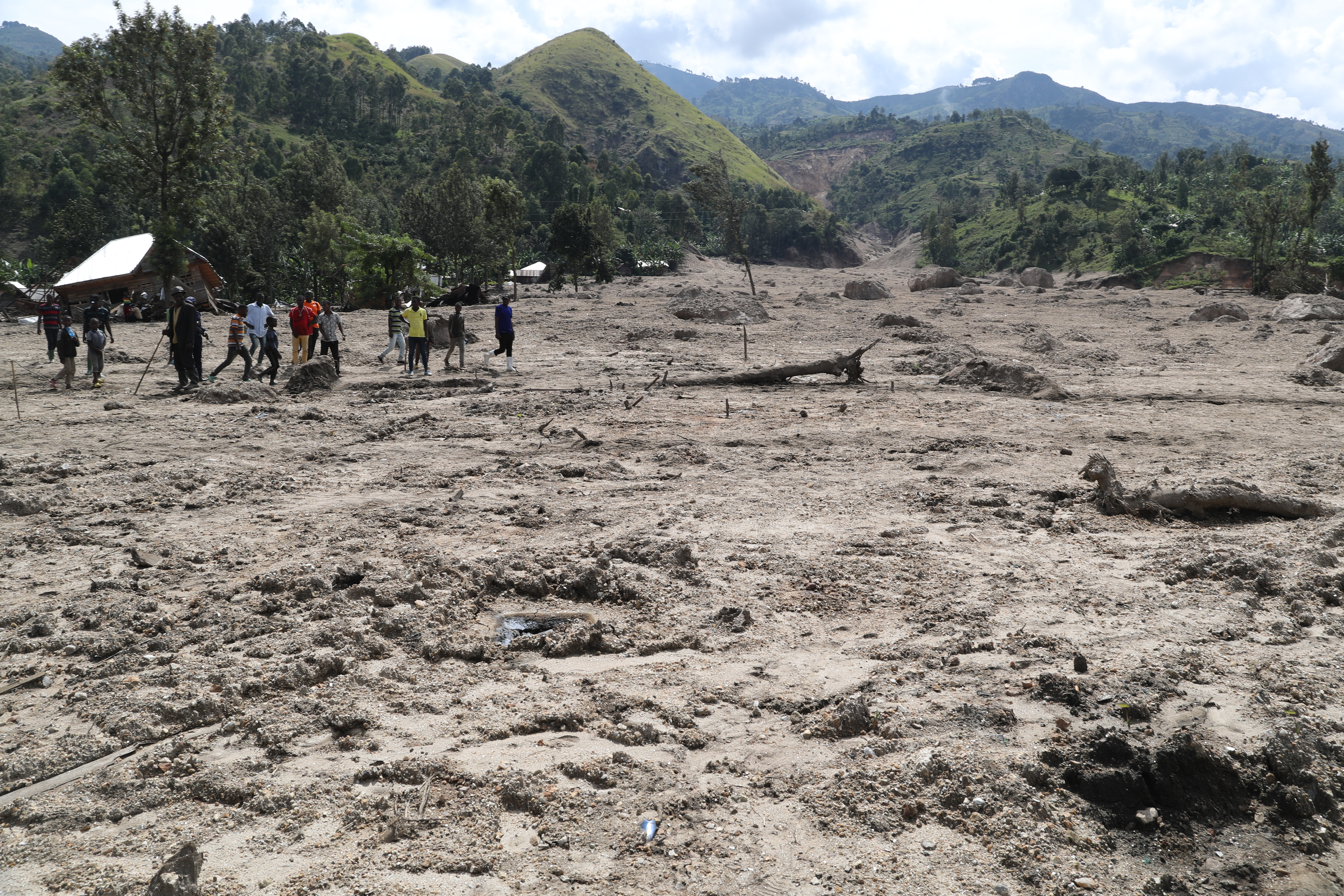
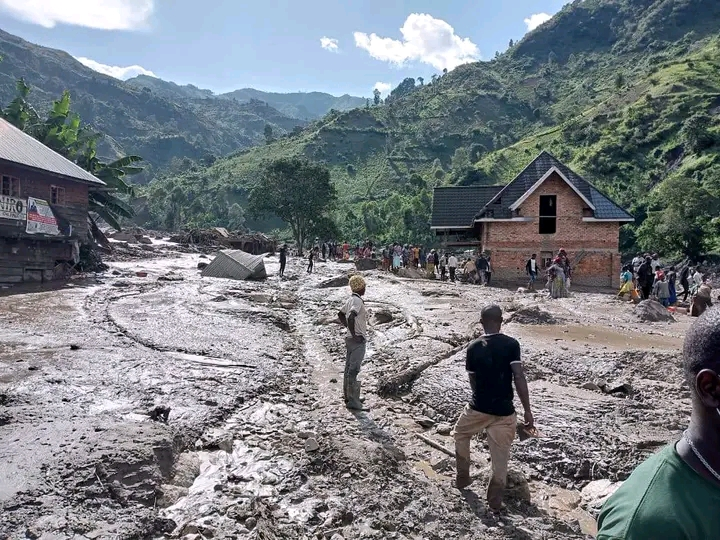
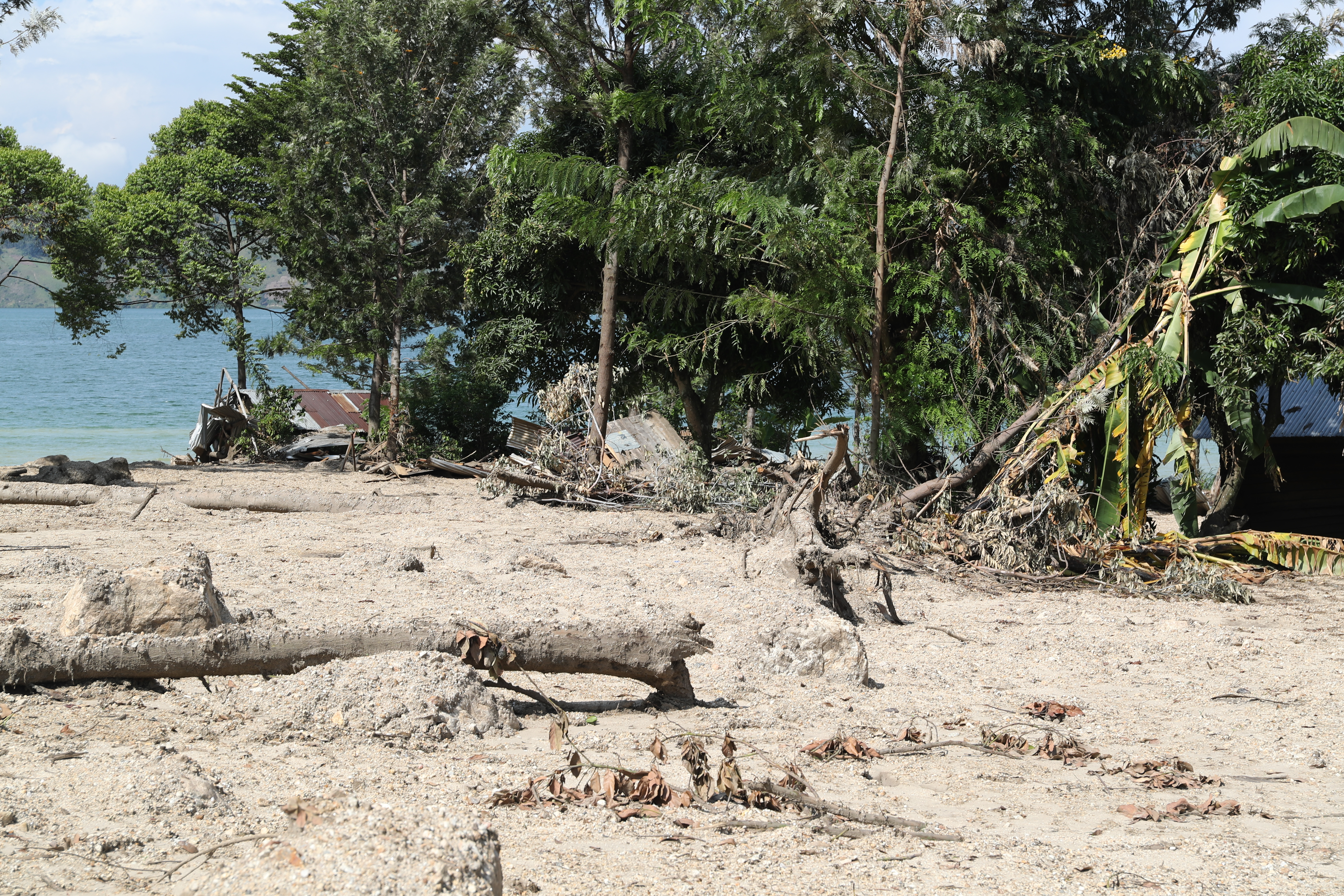
Flooding in Kalehe Territory

The province is prone to seasonal flooding, particularly during the rainy season, which frequently disrupts infrastructure and settlements.

=== Environmental issues ===
Natural disasters have intensified in South Kivu since the early 2000s. From 2007 onward, the recurrence interval decreased to less than two years, following approximately three decades of relatively infrequent disasters in the eastern DRC highlands. The period from 2013 to 2016 was characterized by numerous natural disasters. Statistics from the South Kivu Civil Protection (Protection civile du Sud-Kivu) provide an overview of their distribution and severity, although the records are not regularly updated. The most affected administrative areas were Walungu Territory, Kalehe Territory, Bukavu, and Idjwi Territory. The most frequently recorded disasters during 2013–2016 were torrential rains (44%), violent winds (17%), mudflows (16%), and floods (3%).

Jean Omasombo Tshonda et al. noted that, unlike before 1980, natural disasters have become regular occurrences in South Kivu. During the 2013–2016 period, these disasters resulted in 146 deaths, 149 missing persons, 188 injuries, 24 destroyed schools, and seven destroyed churches.

=== Administrative divisions ===
Approximate correspondence between historical and current province
Belgian Congo				Republic of the Congo		Zaïre		Democratic Republic of the Congo	
1908	1919	1932	1947	1963	1966	1971	1988	1997	2015
22 districts	4 provinces	6 provinces	6 provinces	21 provinces + capital	8 provinces + capitale	8 régions + capitale	11 provinces	11 provinces	26 provinces
Bas-Uele	Orientale	Stanleyville	Orientale	Uele	Orientale	Haut-Zaïre		Orientale	Bas-Uele
Haut-Uele	Orientale	Stanleyville	Orientale	Uele	Orientale	Haut-Zaïre		Orientale	Haut-Uele
Ituri	Orientale	Stanleyville	Orientale	Kibali-Ituri	Orientale	Haut-Zaïre		Orientale	Ituri
Stanleyville	Orientale	Stanleyville	Orientale	Haut-Congo	Orientale	Haut-Zaïre		Orientale	Tshopo
Aruwimi	Orientale	Stanleyville	Orientale	Haut-Congo	Orientale	Haut-Zaïre		Orientale	Tshopo
Maniema	Orientale	Costermansville	Kivu	Maniema	Kivu		Maniema		
Lowa	Orientale	Costermansville	Kivu	Maniema	Kivu		Maniema		
Kivu	Orientale	Costermansville	Kivu	Nord-Kivu	Kivu		Nord-Kivu		
Kivu	Orientale	Costermansville	Kivu	Kivu-Central	Kivu		Sud-Kivu		

South Kivu is administratively structured into a decentralized system that balances governance between the central government, provincial authorities, and localized territorial entities. The province is hierarchically divided into several administrative subdivisions, including territories, cities, communes, sectors, and chiefdoms. Both the province and decentralized territorial entities (Entités Territoriales Décentralisées; ETDs) possess legal personality, allowing them to manage economic, human, financial, and technical resources autonomously.

==== Territories ====
The province is composed of eight territories, each governed by a Territorial Administrator, who is assisted by two Assistant Territorial Administrators. These officials, appointed by the Ministry of the Interior and Security, are responsible for implementing state policies and overseeing governance in remote or rural areas. The province's administration is further supervised by the provincial governor, who acts as the President's representative in South Kivu.

The territories include:

Territory	Map
Fizi	Fizi
Idjwi	Idjwi
Kabare	Kabare
Kalehe	Kalehe
Mwenga	Mwenga
Shabunda	Shabunda
Uvira	Uvira
Walungu	Walungu

==== Cities ====
South Kivu has four officially recognized cities: Bukavu, Uvira, Baraka, and Kamituga.

Cities	Details
Bukavu	As the provincial capital and established in 1901, it was designated an urban district in 1925 and granted city status in 1958. The city is divided into three communes: Bagira, Ibanda, and Kadutu, comprising 20 quarters and more than 400 avenues. As the economic center of South Kivu, Bukavu's economy is primarily driven by the informal sector and small and medium-sized enterprises. Key industries include quinine production by Pharmakina, beverage manufacturing by Bralima, and mattress production by GINKI. Additional small-scale industries produce shoes, plastic containers, wood products, and artisanal soap. The city also hosts financial institutions, banks, and money transfer agencies. Notably, CJX Minerals Mining, a private Congolese company founded in 2014, is the leading exporter of 3T minerals (tin, tantalum, tungsten, and gold) in the Democratic Republic of the Congo.
Uvira	Historically the administrative center of Uvira Territory since 25 February 1938, gained city status through a 2013 Prime Ministerial decree, which was formally ratified by President Joseph Kabila on 27 December 2018. The city's status was reinforced by Decree No. 13/029 on 13 June 2019, officially recognizing it as the second city of South Kivu after Bukavu. Uvira comprises three communes: Kalundu, Mulongwe, and Kagando. The city's economy is largely based on subsistence agriculture, with family-based farming serving as a primary means of livelihood. Uvira is home to the Nabahya Food Institute and an International Institute of Tropical Agriculture research station. Due to Uvira's proximity to Lake Tanganyika, one of the world's deepest lakes, fishing is a key economic activity that provides employment for approximately 1% of the local population. Livestock breeding and poultry farming are also widespread among residents.
Baraka	Situated west of the Ubwari Peninsula on the west side of Lake Tanganyika, Baraka was granted city status on 10 February 2010, and officially recognized in 2018 through Presidential Decree No. 13/29 of 13 June 2018. It is the third-largest city in South Kivu and serves as the socio-economic hub of Fizi Territory.
Kamituga	Founded in 1923 by the Compagnie Minière des Grands-Lacs (MGL), Kamituga's development was driven by its role as a mining center. The city was granted official status through Decrees No. 13/029 and 13/030 of 13 June 2013. However, the implementation of these decrees was suspended in 2015, reducing the number of recognized cities. Kamituga's city status was later reaffirmed in December 2018. As the administrative center of Mwenga Territory, Kamituga's growth was historically tied to the exploitation of gold-bearing gravels from the Elila River Basin. Mining activities were initially managed by MGL, which merged with Kivumines, Phibraki, and Cobelmin in 1969. In 1976, the company further merged with SYMETAIN to form Société Minière et Industrielle du Kivu (SOMINKI). The Congolese state held a 28% stake in SOMINKI, with the majority of shares controlled by the Empain Group.

==== Chiefdoms and sectors ====
Traditional governance structures include chiefdoms and sectors. They are based on traditional systems of local leadership that existed in the Belgian Congo before they were brought into the official state government system. In these systems, leadership was often inherited and followed the customs of different ethnic groups. A chiefdom is led by a mwami, who is the main customary chief. The chiefdoms also oversee groupements, which are led by chiefs known as chefs de groupement. Each groupement is then divided into localités (villages), which are managed by chefs de localités (village chiefs). The province has 18 chiefdoms, five sectors, 185 groupements, and 2,428 localités.

Territory	Chiefdoms and sectors
Fizi Territory	Lulenge Sector
	Mutambala Sector
	Ngandja Sector
	Tanganyika Sector
Idjwi Territory	Rubenga Chiefdom
	Ntambuka Chiefdom
Kabare Territory	Kabare Chiefdom
	Nindja Chiefdom
Kalehe Territory	Buhavu Chiefdom
	Buloho Chiefdom
Mwenga Territory	Wamuzimu Chiefdom
	Itombwe Sector
	Lwindi Chiefdom
	Burhinyi Chiefdom
	Basile Chiefdom
	Luhwindja Chiefdom
Shabunda Territory	Bakisi Chiefdom
	Wakabango Chiefdom
Uvira Territory	Bafuliiru Chiefdom
	Bavira Chiefdom
	Ruzizi Plain Chiefdom
Walungu Territory	Ngweshe Chiefdom
	Kaziba Chiefdom

== Demographics ==
By March 2021, South Kivu's population was estimated at 9,860,637, nearly double the 2007 figure of 4,451,663. Population density remains highly uneven, with densely populated highland regions contrasting with sparsely inhabited forested lowlands. In 2007, Kabare, Walungu, Idjwi, and Kalehe Territories, which together accounted for only 15% of the province's total area, contained 38.61% of its population, whereas the more extensive territories of Shabunda, Mwenga, and Fizi, covering 78.08% of the landmass, were home to just 38.12% of residents. Approximately 86.9% of South Kivu's population lived in rural areas at that time. Population concentrations are greatest in the mountainous northern regions, whereas the southern lowland and forest zones remain relatively underpopulated.

=== Ethnic composition ===
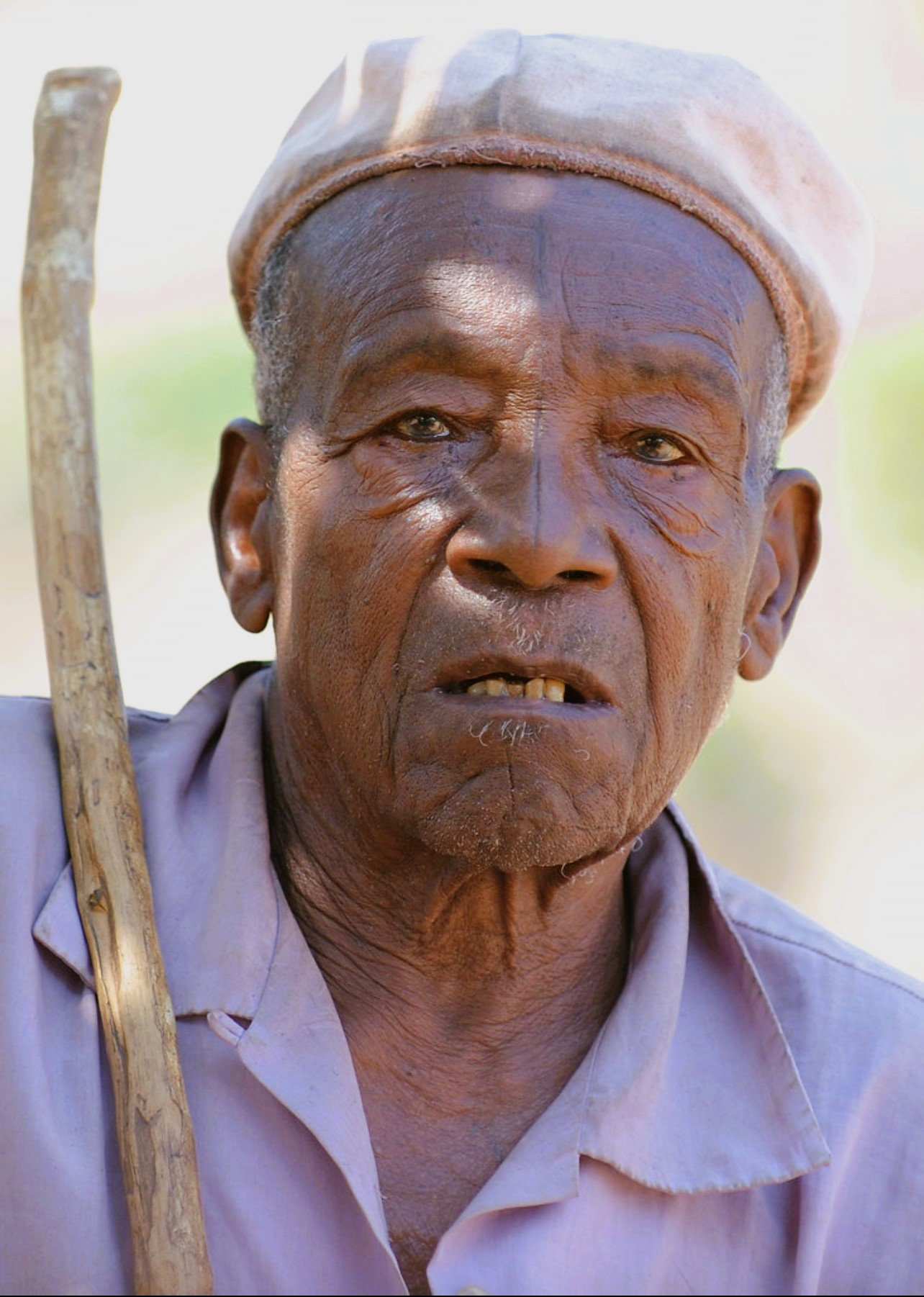
An elderly Bembe man from Fizi Territory

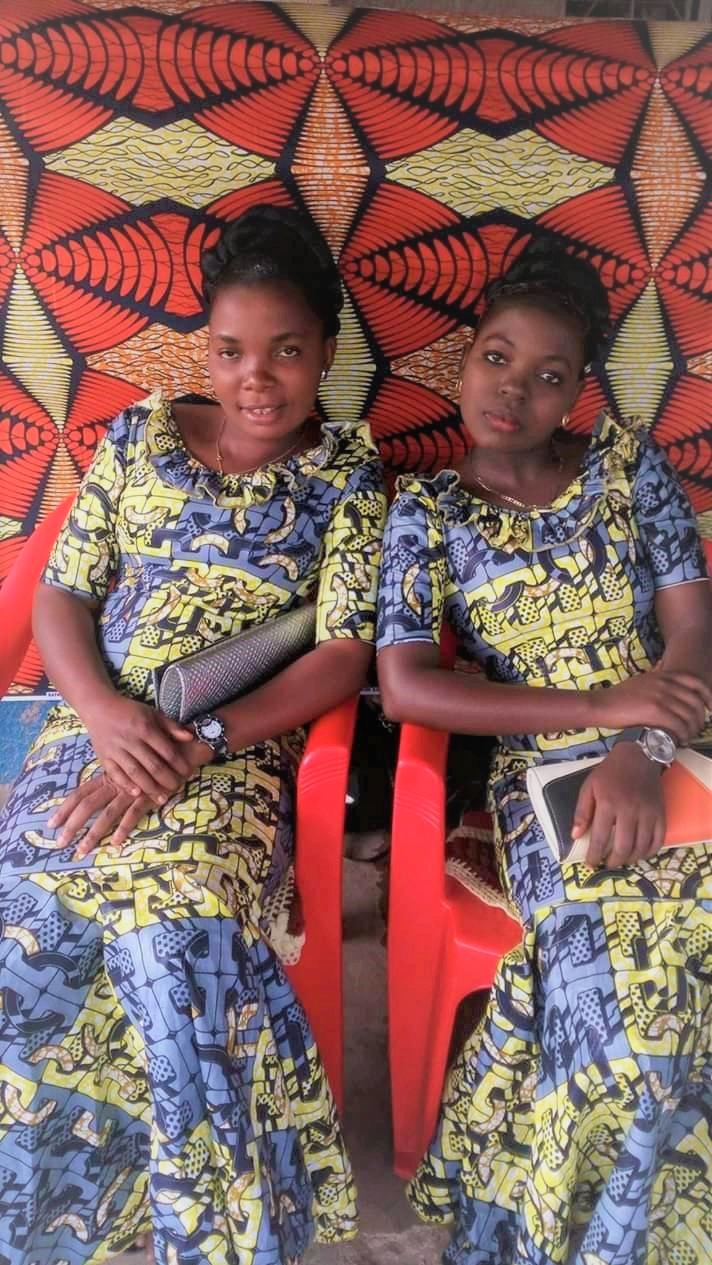
Fuliru women in Uvira

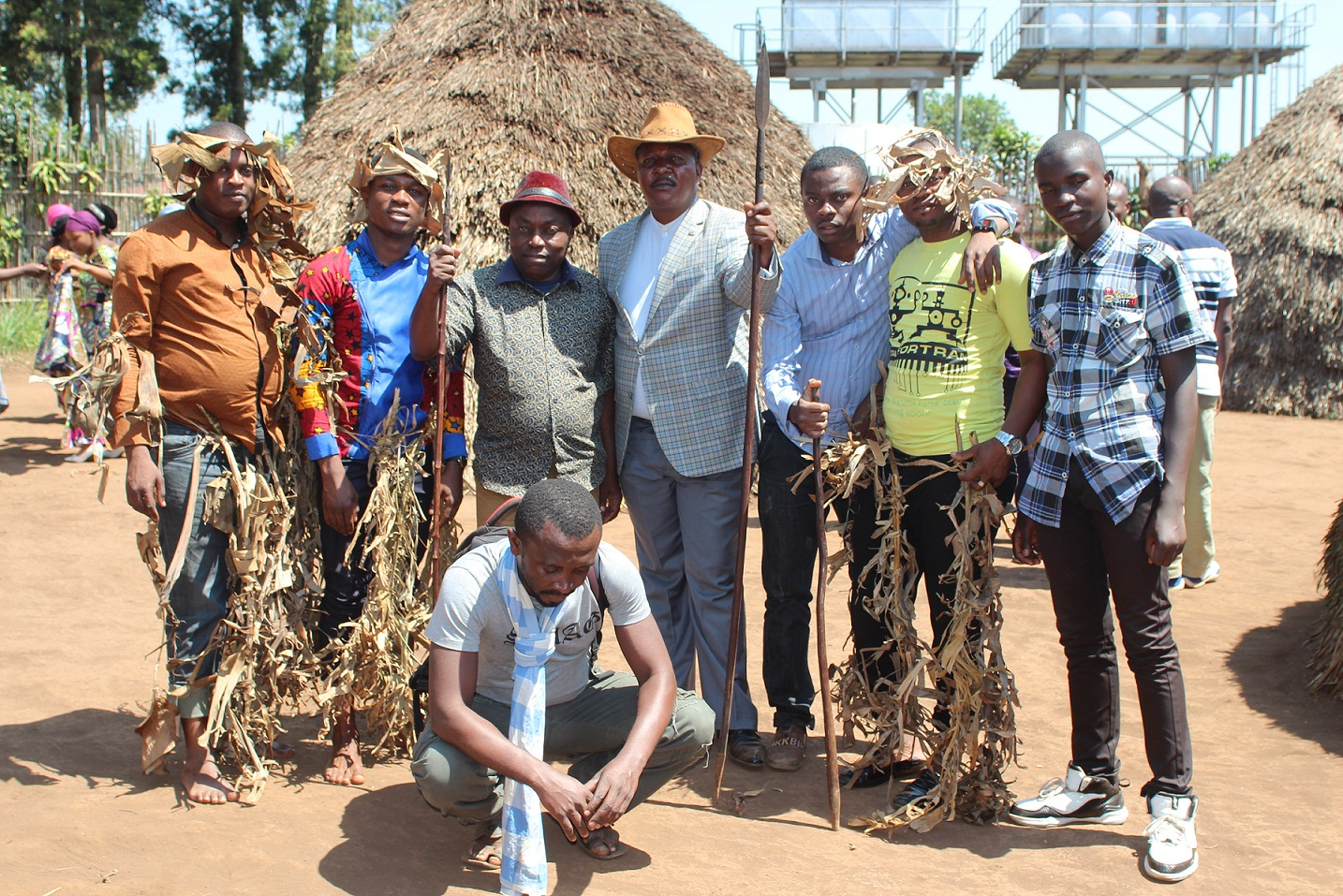
Shi people in Kabare Chiefdom of Kabare Territory

The population is ethnically and linguistically diverse, with most of the population belonging to Bantu-speaking groups. According to Congolese scholar Safanto Lukendo Bulongo, the province's inhabitants can broadly be categorized into two prominent socio-political families, the first of which consists of interlacustrine pastoral Bantu groups characterized by centralized political systems governed by hierarchical chieftaincies that control land and people. The second group includes non-centralized Bantu societies, organized into smaller, autonomous kinship-based groups. The province's main ethnic groups include the Bashi, Bafuliiru, Bavira, Babembe, Barega, as well as Banyindu, Babwari, Babuyu, Batembo, Bazoba, Bakwami, Basongora, Barongeronge, Baholoholo, Baswaga, Banyanga, and Bazimba, among others, alongside various Pygmy ethnic groups. These populations are often organized around notions of autochthony, which is a sense of indigeneity profoundly tied to ancestral land and lineage, while non-indigenous communities, such as the Banyamulenge (Tutsi) and Barundi (Hutu), have also long been present.

Ethno-geographical distribution varies by territory: the Bahavu predominantly inhabit Kalehe Territory and Idjwi Territory. The Bashi form the majority in Idjwi Territory, Kabare Territory and Walungu Territory; the Bafuliiru and Bavira in Uvira Territory, where the Barundi are also found, particularly in the Ruzizi Plain; the Babembe primarily occupy Fizi Territory, which also hosts the Banyamulenge pastoralists of Rwandan Tutsi origin; and the Barega mainly reside in Mwenga Territory and Shabunda Territory. The Bashi are the province's most dominant group, and for administrative and political purposes, South Kivu's communities are often categorized into two broad groups: the "large family", dominated by Bashi, and the "small family", which includes the Balega and various other minority groups.

=== Languages and health ===
French is the official language, while Swahili serves as the lingua franca. Several local languages are also spoken:

Territory	Local languages
Fizi	Kibembe, Kizoba, Kibwari, Masanze, Kibuyu, Kinyindu, Kinyarwanda
Idjwi	Kihavu (a dialect of Mashi), Kinyarwanda, Kimbuti
Kabare	Mashi, Kitembo, Kirega, Kimbuti
Kalehe	Kitembo, Kihavu, Kirongeronge, Mashi
Mwenga	Kirega, Kibembe, Kinyindu, Mashi
Shabunda	Kirega, Kitembo, Kikwami, Kisongola, Kizimba
Uvira	Kivira, Kifuliiru, Kinyarwanda, Kirundi, Kizoba, Kinyindu, Kibembe
Walungu	Mashi, Kirega, Kifuliiru

Administratively, South Kivu's healthcare system is organized into 34 health zones (zones de santé), which are grouped into five health districts (districts sanitaires).

No.	Zone de Santé (Health Zone)	Notes
1	Fizi	Fizi Territory
2	Kalole	Fizi Territory
3	Nundu	Fizi Territory
4	Minembwe	Hauts-Plateaux of Fizi
5	Itombwe	Mwenga Territory
6	Kimbi Lulenge	Mwenga Territory
7	Mwenga	Central Mwenga Territory
8	Kamituga	Kamituga city
9	Kitutu	Shabunda Territory
10	Lulingu	Shabunda Territory
11	Shabunda	Central Shabunda Territory
12	Mulungu	Shabunda Territory
13	Kalehe	Central Kalehe Territory
14	Bunyakiri	Kalehe Territory
15	Minova	Kalehe/border with North Kivu
16	Katana	Kabare Territory
17	Miti-Murhesa	Kabare Territory
18	Kabare	Central Kabare Territory
19	Kaziba	Walungu Territory
20	Kaniola	Walungu Territory
21	Nyantende	Walungu Territory
22	Walungu	Central Walungu Territory
23	Ruzizi	Uvira Territory lowlands
24	Lemera	Uvira Territory
25	Uvira	Uvira city
26	Hauts-Plateaux	Uvira Territory highlands
27	Mwana	Uvira Territory (mountain area)
28	Mubumbano	Uvira Territory
29	Bagira	Bukavu city
30	Ibanda	Bukavu city
31	Idjwi	Idjwi Territory
32	Nyangezi	Walungu Territory
33	Kalonge	Kalehe highlands
34	Kabiza	

=== Migration ===
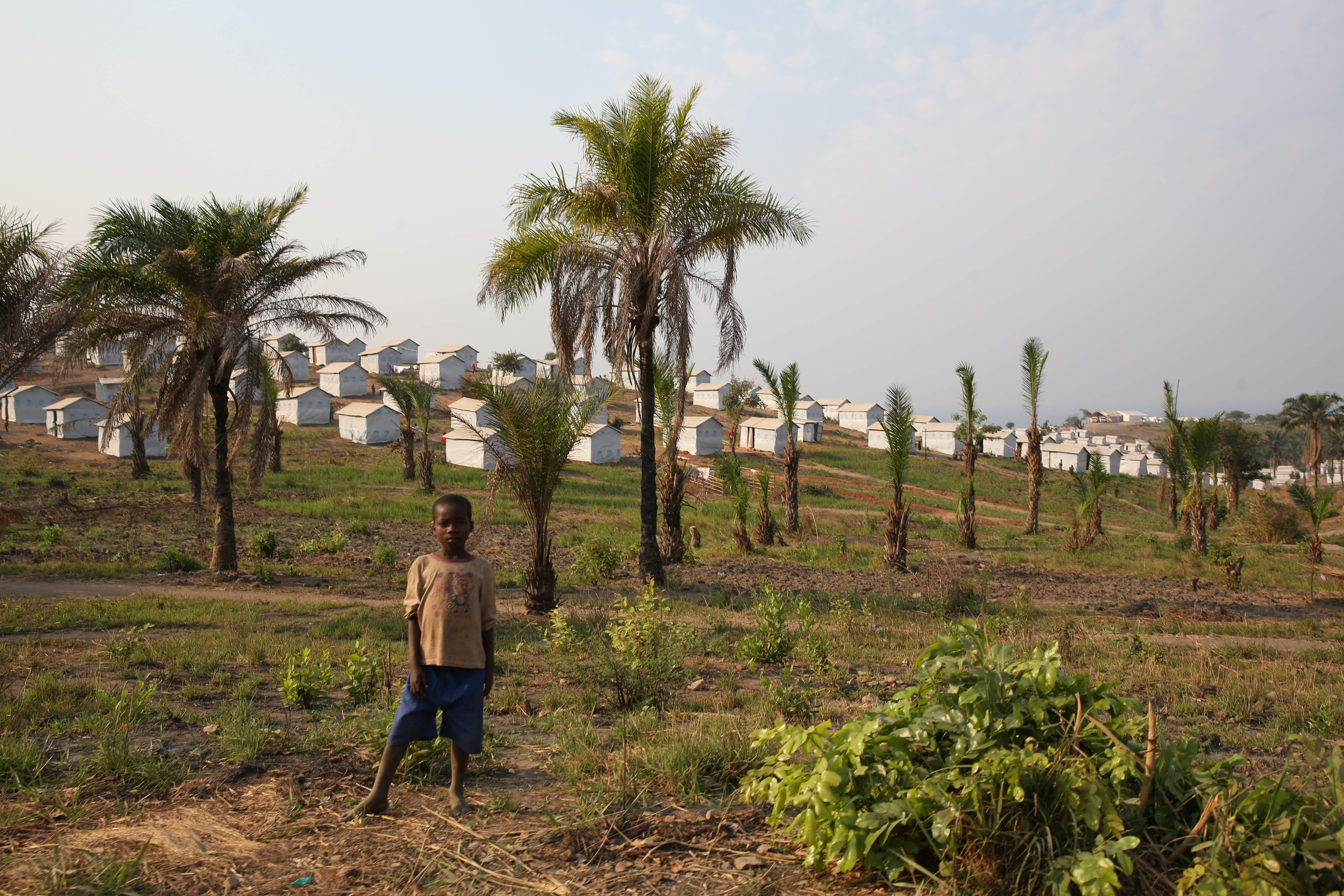
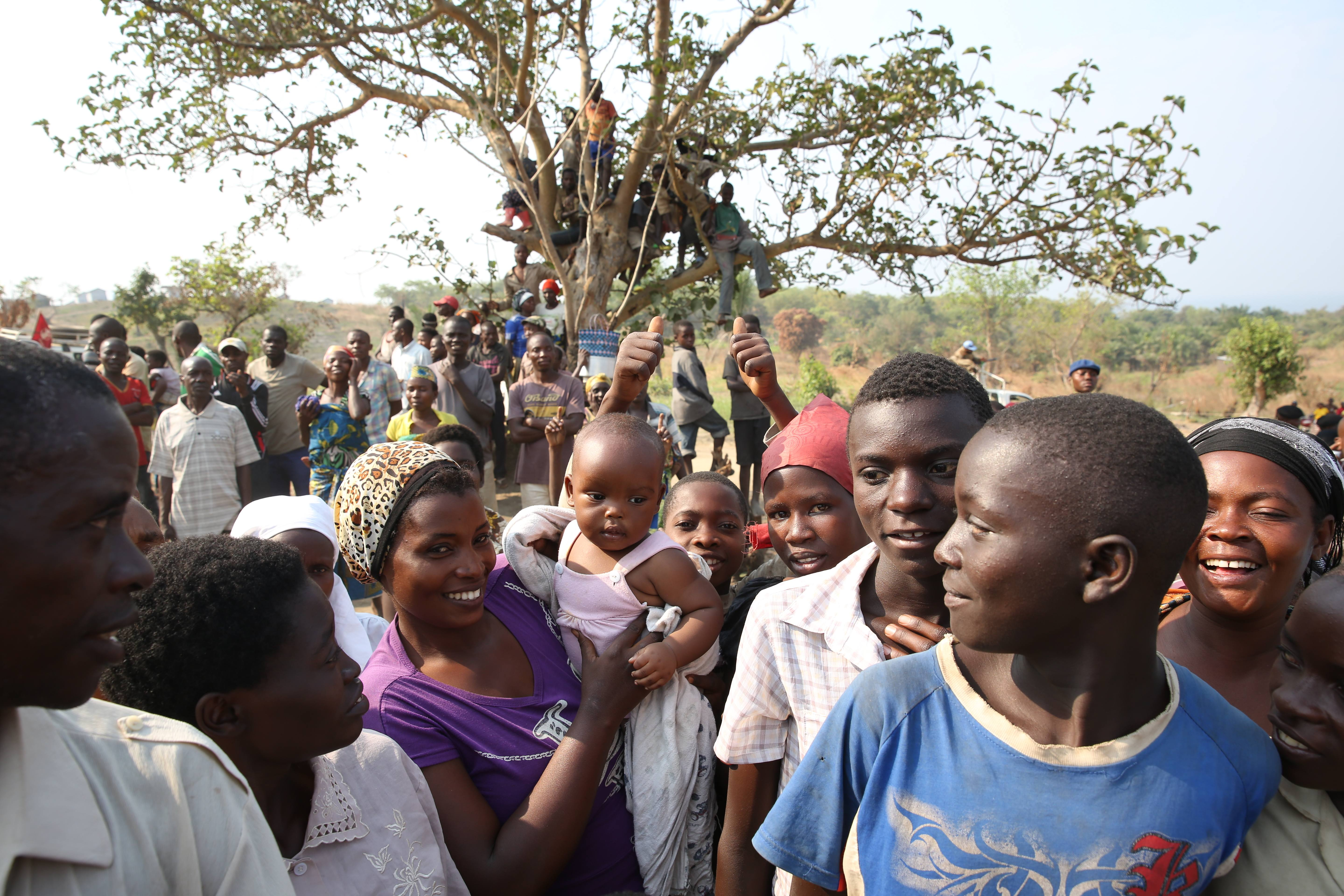
Lusenda Refugee Camp, located in the Tanganyika sector, was established in 2015 to host Burundian refugees fleeing political unrest and is operated by the United Nations High Commissioner for Refugees (UNHCR).

The province's geographical position, situated along international borders with Rwanda, Burundi, and Tanzania, has made it a natural destination for cross-border migration. The province is home to many immigrants and refugees who are fleeing regional conflicts or seeking economic opportunities. Internal migration is also widespread, driven by artisanal and industrial mining, especially in gold-rich regions, land shortages in densely populated highlands, insecurity stemming from ongoing armed conflicts, and rural-to-urban migration as people seek improved living standards. A data collection exercise conducted by the Displacement Tracking Matrix (DTM) of the International Organization for Migration (IOM), in partnership with the Réseau d'Action pour le Développement et le Progrès Intégré (RADPI) and the Division Provinciale des Affaires Humanitaires (DIVAH) of South Kivu, from 1 to 31 July 2022, recorded 1,288,574 internally displaced persons (IDPs) across South Kivu. They were identified in 34 health zones and 5,260 villages. The assessment also reported 802,535 returnees, 31,004 IDPs living in spontaneous sites, 64% of IDPs being women and children, and 16% of the provincial population affected by displacement, with 82% coverage of the province. IDPs were largely concentrated in Kalehe, Kabare, Walungu, Uvira, and Fizi Territories, where some zones hosted more than 53,600 displaced people, while returnees were mainly found in Kalehe, Shabunda, and Fizi, reaching up to 71,500 per health zone.

== History ==
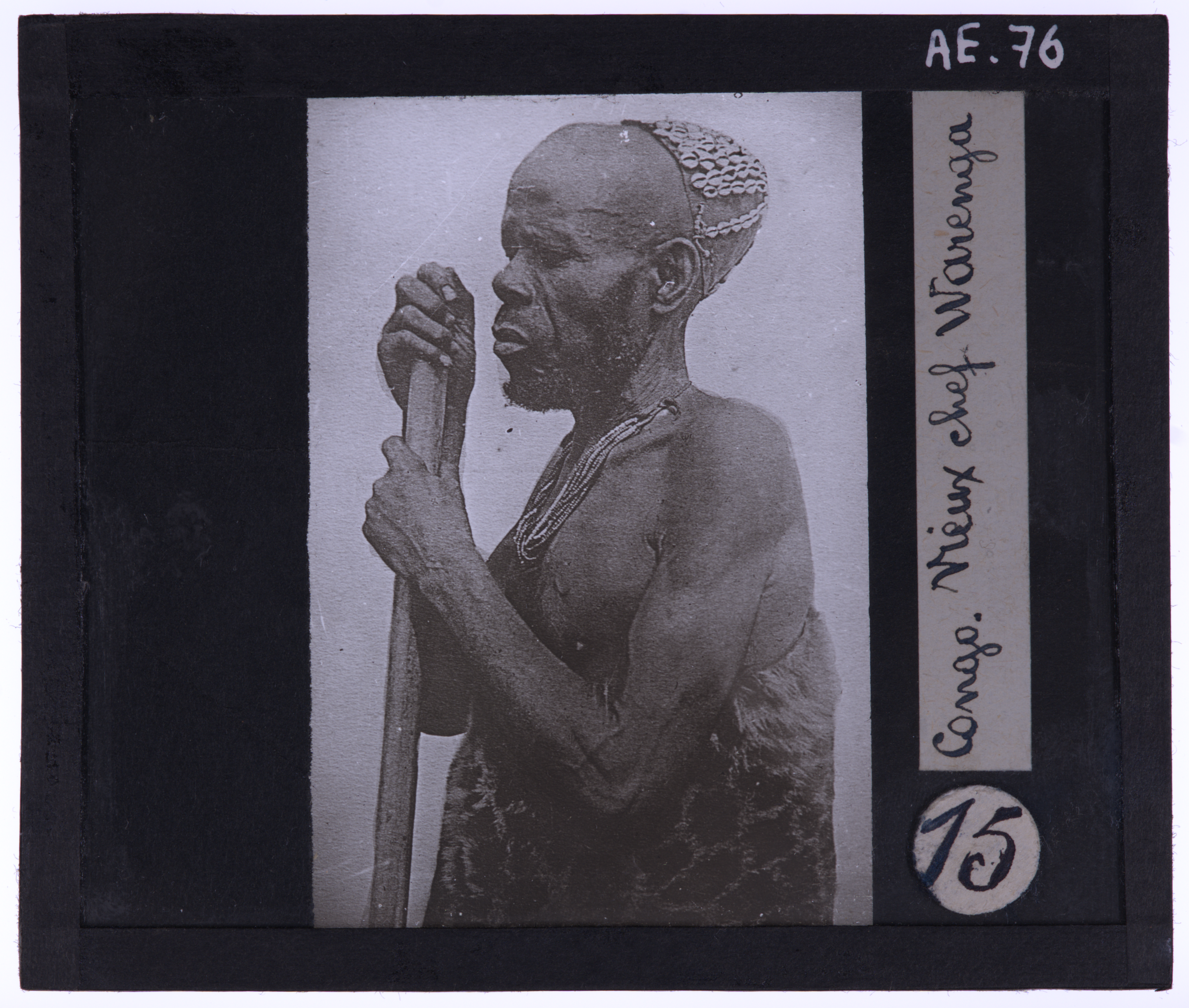
Lega man wearing a headdress adorned with cowrie shells, traditionally worn by initiates of the Bwami society. Circa 1890–1930.

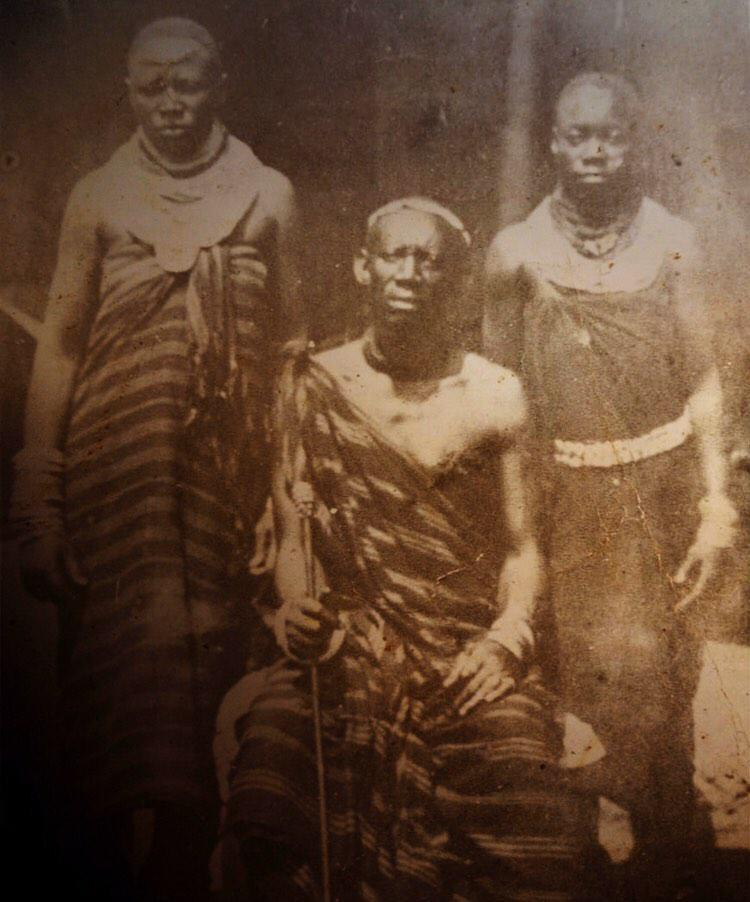
Mwami Mukogabwe II of Bafuliiru Chiefdom in Lemera, Belgian Congo, circa 1925

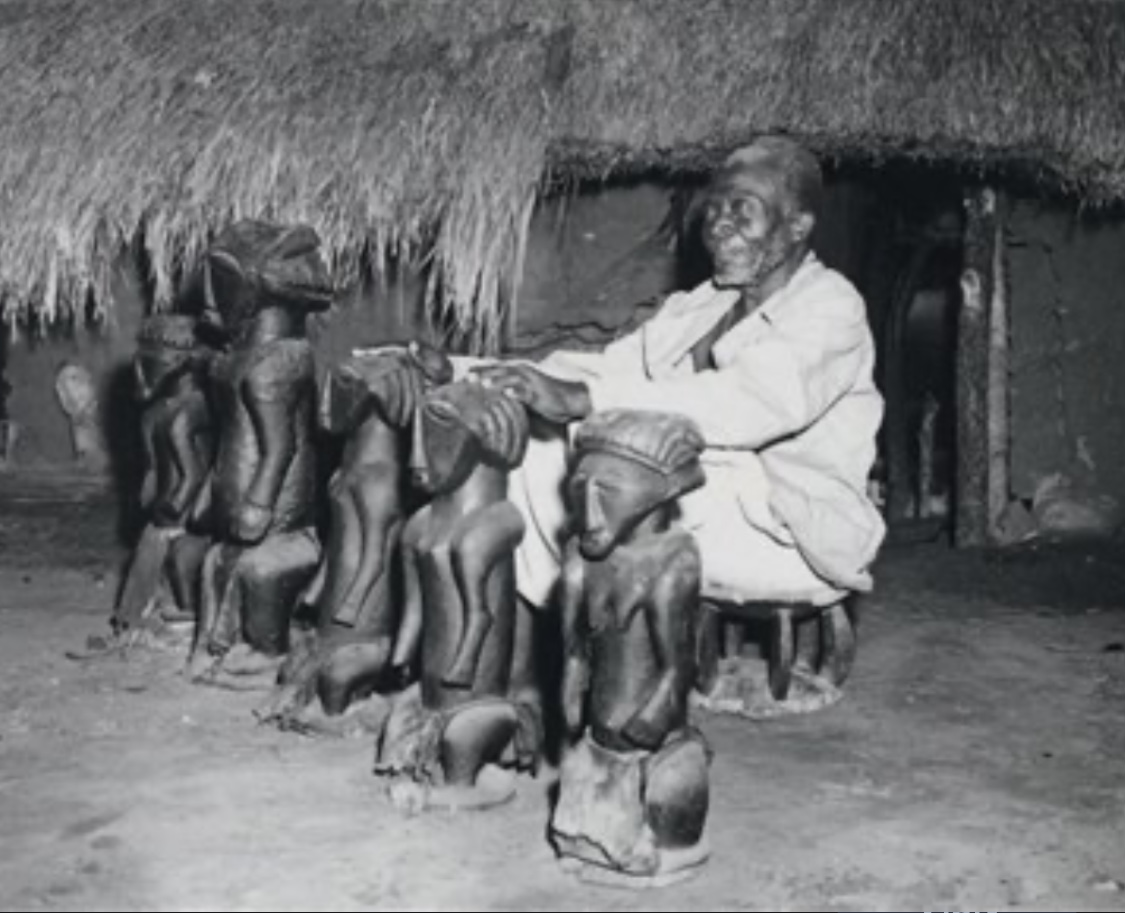
An elderly Bembe man seated indoors, dressed in traditional attire, engaged in a cultural and spiritual practice. Photographed by Daniel P. Biebuyck, circa 1950s.

=== Pre-colonial and colonial era ===
The region was inhabited by various Bantu-speaking ethnic groups, including the Bamushi, Bafuliiru, Bahavu, Banyindu, Babembe, Bazoba, Babuyu, Balega, Babwari, Baholoholo, Banyanga, Bavira, Bakusu, Batembo, Barongeronge, and Baswaga, along with Pygmy communities. In the late 19th century, the Banyarwanda, whose ancestors had fled Rwanda after falling out with the ruling Nyiginya dynasty, settled in the Itombwe area. Around the same period, Barundi migrants, primarily of Bahutu origin, established communities in the Ruzizi Plain, initially settling between Luvungi and Kiliba before gradually expanding northward toward Kamanyola. Meanwhile, during the scramble for Africa, European explorers were primarily focused on locating the source of the Nile, a mystery that had long intrigued European geographers. Initially, the Ruzizi River was mistakenly believed to be the Nile's source, as it was thought to drain the waters of Lake Tanganyika toward the north. However, further expeditions later confirmed that the Ruzizi River was a tributary of Lake Tanganyika rather than its emissary. The territorial boundaries of what would later become South Kivu were first delineated during the Berlin Conference of 1885, where European powers formalized their claims over African territories. The northeastern boundary of the Congo Free State was established as "a straight line coming from the northern end of Lake Tanganyika and ending at a point located on the 30th east meridian and at 1° 20' south latitude; further north, the border is formed by the 30th meridian east". Under this arrangement, all of Lake Kivu and both banks of the Ruzizi River were incorporated into the Congo Free State. The name "Kivu" gained prominence after explorer David Livingstone encountered it during his travels to Uvira in 1867 and learned the term from local inhabitants.

On 3 September 1886, Administrator General Camille Janssen issued a decree establishing nine districts within the colony, including Stanley Falls District, each governed by a district commissioner. As a result of this administrative restructuring, a territory known as Ruzizi-Kivu was integrated into Stanley Falls District. On 15 July 1898, a new decree renamed Stanley Falls District as Orientale Province, with Stanleyville (now Kisangani) as its capital.

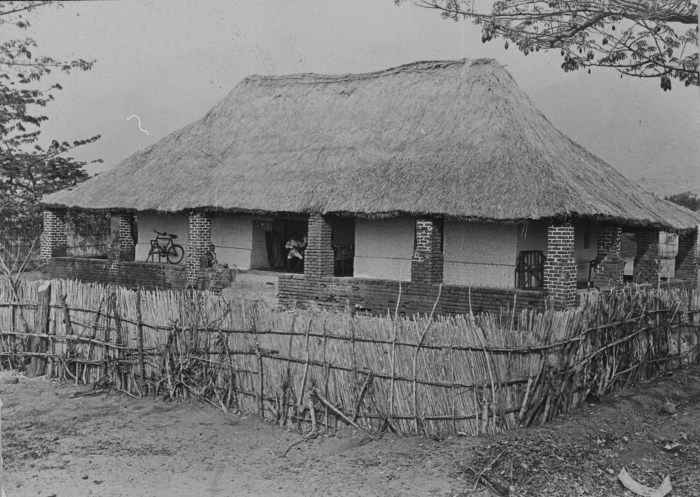
A house in Uvira, photographed in 1913

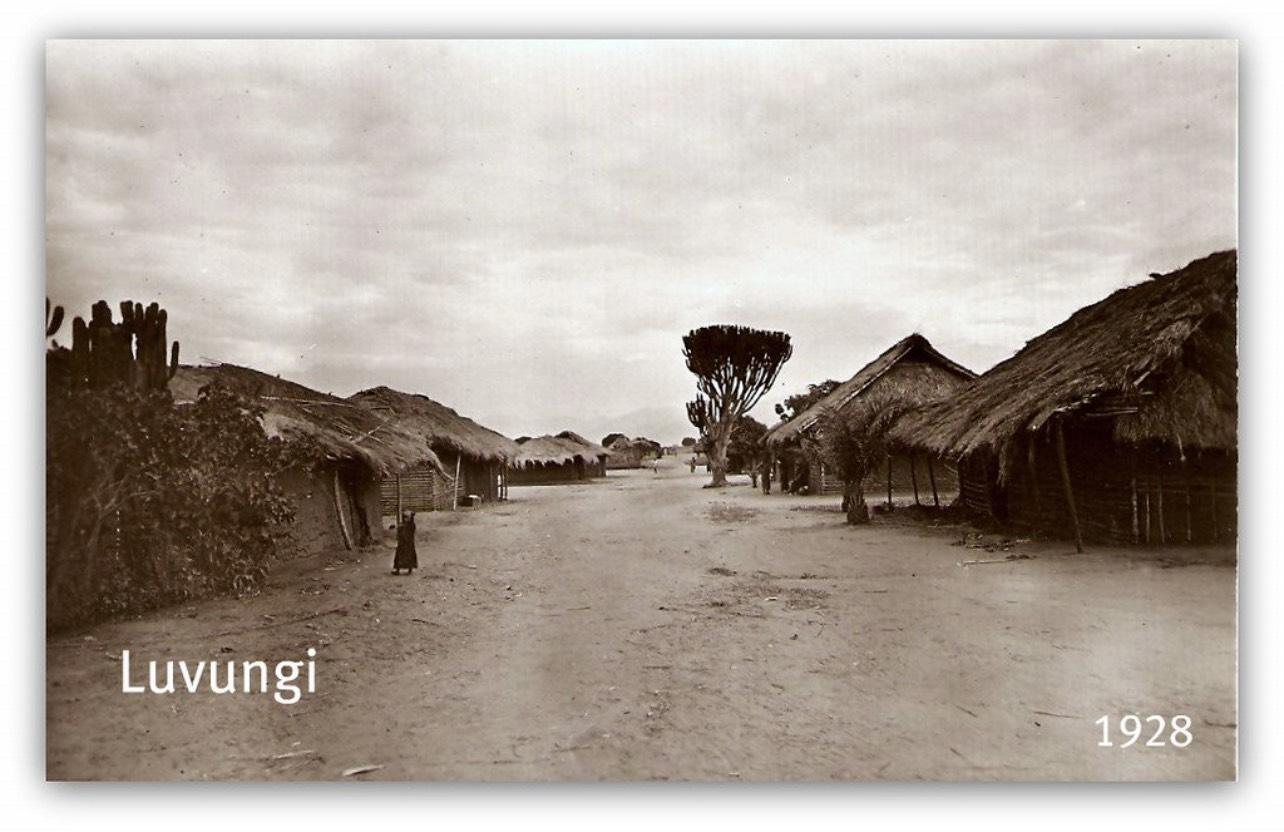
A 1928 view of Luvungi

In June 1909, the region became the site of the Kivu Frontier Incident when John Methuen Coote, a British officer from the Uganda Protectorate, established fortified camps at Burungu and Rubona on Lake Kivu. British troops under Coote withdrew from Rubona on 29 June 1909, allowing Belgian forces to take control of the post. The dispute was later resolved in May 1910, when the colonial boundaries between the Belgian Congo, the Uganda Protectorate, and German East Africa (now Rwanda) were officially settled, with eastern Kivu allocated to Uganda and Rwanda. Kivu District was formally created on 28 March 1912, through a royal decree that restructured the Congo into 22 districts. The newly established Kivu District was subdivided into three sectors: Lake Edward (with Beni as its administrative center), Tanganyika (Uvira), and Rutshuru (Rutshuru). In 1923, during a visit to Bukavu, the Commissioner of Orientale Province received a request from the European settler community to transfer the district capital from Rutshuru to Bukavu, citing its central location, mild climate, and scenic setting on Lake Kivu as making it a more suitable administrative center. The transfer was approved in 1924, officially designating Bukavu as the headquarters of the Kivu District. From 1925 onward, the area experienced economic and infrastructural growth, marked by the arrival of Prince Eugène de Ligne and his wife from Usumbura (now Bujumbura), who established the Linéa Company on the Idjwi archipelago that same year. According to Colonel Xavier Diericx, significant progress was recorded in Kivu from 1927.

On 25 September 1933, the provinces of the Belgian Congo were reorganized, and the amount of autonomy of the former provinces was reduced. The provinces were renamed after their respective administrative capitals, and Orientale Province was split into Stanleyville Province and Costermansville Province. On 1 October 1947, Costermansville Province was renamed Kivu Province. Kivu Province initially consisted of the districts of Kivu and Maniema. On 1 January 1951, Kivu District was subdivided into North Kivu District, with Goma as its administrative center, and South Kivu District, whose capital remained Costermansville (renamed Bukavu after independence).

=== Post-independence ===
Following Congolese independence, the law of 27 April 1962 introduced a new territorial reorganization that transformed the former district structure into provincial administrations. Under this reform, South Kivu, North Kivu, and Maniema were established as separate provinces. A subsequent administrative reorganization in 1963 merged these entities into the newly created Central Kivu Province, which included the territories of Bukavu, Kabare, Kalehe, Goma, Fizi, Rutshuru, Shabunda, and Uvira.

As soon as independence was proclaimed on 30 June 1960, unrest broke out, and the country descended into a prolonged political instability known as the Congo Crisis. The principal catalysts were the mutiny of the Force Publique, the secession of Katanga, and the confrontation involving the government of Prime Minister Patrice Lumumba, Belgium, and several other Western powers. After the Force Publique mutiny began in Thysville (now Mbanza-Ngungu) on 5 July 1960, disturbances spread to other parts of the country, including Goma on 8 July. These events ultimately led to the fragmentation of state authority and culminated in the assassination of Lumumba in January 1961. By the end of 1960, the country was divided among four competing political entities: the secessionist State of Katanga, the Autonomous State of South Kasai, the central government in Léopoldville, and the rival government established in Stanleyville under Antoine Gizenga, with each of these entities claiming legitimacy over the Congolese state.

During this period, a movement emerged among Kivu politicians to attempt, much as the colonial authorities had once done, to regroup peoples of common origin who had been divided among different administrative entities. It was believed that strengthening an organization based on what was now considered a "better understood" ethnic identity would promote political and economic development as well as cultural unity. The theory of ethnic and cultural unity led the government of Adrien Omari to divide South Kivu into three ethnic districts: Lake Kivu, Elila, and Lake Tanganyika. The Lake Kivu District grouped together the Shi and the Havu within Kabare Territory and Kalehe Territory, along with the city of Bukavu. The Elila District encompassed Bulega, composed of Mwenga Territory, Shabunda Territory, and Pangi Territory. The Lake Tanganyika District brought together the Vira, Fuliru, Bembe, Buyu, Tutsi, and Rundi peoples. As part of this reorganization, Walungu was incorporated into Kabare Territory, while Idjwi was attached to Kalehe Territory.

On 19 October 1960, political leaders from Ngweshe Chiefdom affiliated with the RECO party, who constituted a majority within the provincial administration, persuaded the government headed by Jean Miruho to divide Kabare Territory into the separate territories of Kabare and Walungu. The decision deepened political divisions between the Kabare Chiefdom and Ngweshe Chiefdom. At the same time, the Nyangezi groupement sought administrative separation from Ngweshe Chiefdom, while the Katana groupement pursued separation from Kabare Chiefdom. The administration headed by Malago, supported by Shi from Ngweshe Chiefdom, became involved in a territorial dispute with Mwenga Territory over proposals to annex the Luhwinja Chiefdom, Burhinyi Chiefdom, and Lwindi Chiefdom into Ngweshe Chiefdom. On 2 February 1964, Katana was officially recognized as a chiefdom during an investiture ceremony presided over by Albert Teuwen, acting Commissaire de district of Lake Kivu in Bukavu. Katana Cakirwa was installed as chief, with Kalibanya serving as deputy chief and Manegabe Bazirashe as secretary. The chiefdom remained in existence until 1967, when President Mobutu abolished all chiefdoms established after independence.

Between 1967 and 1986, much of the southern portion of present-day South Kivu was controlled by the Maquis of Fizi, a self-proclaimed socialist polity led by Laurent-Désiré Kabila. The Maquis de Fizi was the longest and best-organized armed opposition to the dictatorial government of Mobutu Sese Seko in Zaire. It remained active until its defeat during the Moba Wars, after which the movement was dismantled.

South Kivu Province was established in 1988 through the enactment of Ordinance-Law No. 88-031 of 20 July 1988, which amended Ordinance-Law No. 82-006 of 25 February 1982 governing the territorial, political, and administrative organization of Zaire. The reform partitioned the former Kivu Province into the provinces of North Kivu, South Kivu, and Maniema, with Bukavu designated as the capital of South Kivu. The process leading to the partition was prepared and implemented under the administrations of Governors Charles Mwando Nsimba and Kilolo Musamba Lubemba.

Although the territorial reorganization was implemented under Mobutu's authority, central government control over Kivu had become increasingly limited during the 1980s. During this period, Mwando, who succeeded in persuading the remaining insurgents in Fizi Territory to align with the government, exercised considerable de facto authority within the province. His administration coincided with the growing influence of the ACOGENOKI (Association coopérative des groupements d'éleveurs du Nord-Kivu) in North Kivu and Kalehe Territory, as well as with the regional instability generated by the insurgencies of the National Resistance Army (NRA) in Uganda and the Sudan People's Liberation Army (SPLA), led respectively by Yoweri Museveni and John Garang. Between 1981 and 1983, eastern Zaire reportedly served as a logistical base for elements associated with these movements. Mwando's administration has also been linked to the sale of land within areas under ACOGENOKI's influence, a practice that reportedly contributed to mounting tensions that intensified following the restoration of multiparty politics after 20 April 1990.

According to several accounts, the 1988 partition of Kivu benefited from the political influence of Léon Kengo wa Dondo, Alphonse-Roger Kithima Bin Ramazani, and Cyprien Rwakabuba Shinga. Contemporary debates surrounding the territorial reorganization are reflected in a letter dated 9 January 1988 from the Goma branch of the Umoja mutual association to its president, Munyamakuba Mugusha, in Kinshasa. The correspondence proposed the creation of two administrative zones intended to encompass areas with significant Tutsi populations should Kalehe Territory, or part of it, be incorporated into North Kivu:

"Here is precise information concerning the creation of a zone within the framework of the partition of North Kivu. If Kalehe or part of this zone is attached to North Kivu, it will then be necessary to consider and strive for the creation of two Tutsi zones, one whose component parts are currently little occupied or unoccupied, and the other already well known to us.

The first proposal concerns Zone I. This zone should consist of areas detached from the following zones: (1) the Rutshuru zone (the northwestern part of Mweso and Bulindi); (2) the Masisi zone (the northern part so as to include Bibwe and Mokoto); the Walikale zone (Ihula and Pinga); and the Lubero zone (the Kanyabayonga and Kayina area).

The second proposal concerns Zone II. This zone should include the parts detached from the Kalehe zone, from Masisi (the southern part and Ufamando), and from Walikale. This area, currently occupied by a heterogeneous and scattered population made up of Batembo, Bahunde, Banyanga, Bahavu, and some Hutu, is of interest. Like the first, it consists of plateaus and high-altitude mountains with a climate favorable to livestock breeding".

After the territorial reorganization, the first governors appointed to the newly created provinces were Désiré Bonaventure Konde Vila-Ki-Kanda for North Kivu, Ndala Kasala for South Kivu, and Tshala Mwana for Maniema. During his official installation in Bukavu on 25 August 1988, Ndala Kasala declared that he intended to serve as a "development governor" and described the partition of Kivu as an experimental reform introduced by the Popular Movement of the Revolution (MPR) under Mobutu to advance the country's development. Later assessments, however, have generally viewed the reform less favorably. Newspaper coverage from Goma, Bukavu, Kindu (including L'hebdo Jua, Le Souverain, Clef, Trou de serrure, Le Cedac, and Les Coulisses), as well as Kinshasa (Graben, Umoja, La Référence Plus, Le Potentiel, La Conscience, and Le Soft), described persistent administrative shortcomings, widening disparities between Kinshasa and the newly established provincial capitals, limited governmental presence beyond urban centers, and declining security and socioeconomic conditions. Thus, progressively, Bukavu became the center of anti-Mobutism and resistance against the Rwandan occupation, while Goma was subjected to the total domination of the rebellion of the Congolese Rally for Democracy (RCD). As for Maniema, it fell into "total abandonment" before being integrated into a new political and economic space created by the RCD and increasingly controlled by Rwanda.

== Conflict and insecurity ==
=== First Congo War ===
During the First Congo War (1996–1997), South Kivu became one of the most severely impacted regions. The war was rooted in the aftermath of the 1994 Rwandan genocide, which saw the Rwandan Patriotic Front (RPF), under Paul Kagame's leadership, depose President Juvénal Habyarimana's Hutu-led government and assume control of Rwanda. In the genocide's wake, nearly two million Rwandan Hutu refugees, including former members of the Rwandan Armed Forces (Forces armées rwandaises; FAR) and the Interahamwe militia, fled into eastern Zaire, particularly to North and South Kivu. Their arrival brought armed elements into the region, which the Zairean government, led by President Mobutu Sese Seko, was largely unable to contain or mitigate through either humanitarian or security measures. During this period, the Rwandan Patriotic Army (RPA), the military wing of the RPF, launched incursions into eastern Zaire aimed at dismantling Hutu insurgent networks operating from within refugee camps. These operations, however, extended beyond combatants and resulted in widespread violence against Hutu civilians. Independent assessments, including a report by United Nations High Commissioner for Refugees (UNHCR) consultant Robert Gersony, estimated that between 5,000 and 10,000 people were killed monthly in mid-1994 as a consequence of these military actions. Reports indicate that RPA units frequently used deceptive tactics, such as convening civilians for purported "peace and reconciliation" meetings, only to carry out mass executions. One such incident occurred on 11 April 1995, when approximately fifty RPA soldiers attacked the Birava camp in Kabare Territory with heavy weaponry, reportedly killing around thirty people and injuring an unknown number of others. Notably, neither the ex-FAR/Interahamwe nor the refugee population mounted a counterattack. Following the assault, survivors were relocated to the Chimanga and Kashusha camps.

By 1996, a coalition comprising the RPA, Ugandan military forces, and the Burundian Forces Armées Burundaises (FAB) began providing military and logistical support to Tutsi communities in eastern Zaire, notably the Banyamulenge. Legal and political scholar Filip Reyntjens describes the First Congo War as the intersection of two overlapping agendas: on one hand, a legitimate defense movement by Congolese Tutsi populations fearing retaliation, and on the other, the strategic use of this rebellion by the Rwandan government to secure political and military influence within Zaire. In April 1996, Banyamulenge armed units originating from Burundi reportedly killed between eight and ten Burundian and Rwandan refugees at the Runingu camp. The assailants subsequently advanced toward the Hauts Plateaux and Moyens Plateaux. On 12 September 1996, Banyamulenge forces killed nine civilians in the villages of Kanyura and Makutano, located in the Itombwe sector of Mwenga Territory. Among the victims were the chef de poste d'encadrement from the Rega ethnic group, his associates, and the chief of the Basimunyaka-Sud groupement, an ethnic Bembe from Fizi Territory, along with two members of his family. The massacre was perceived by many in the Bembe community as the beginning of an all-out assault against them.

==== Uvira Territory ====
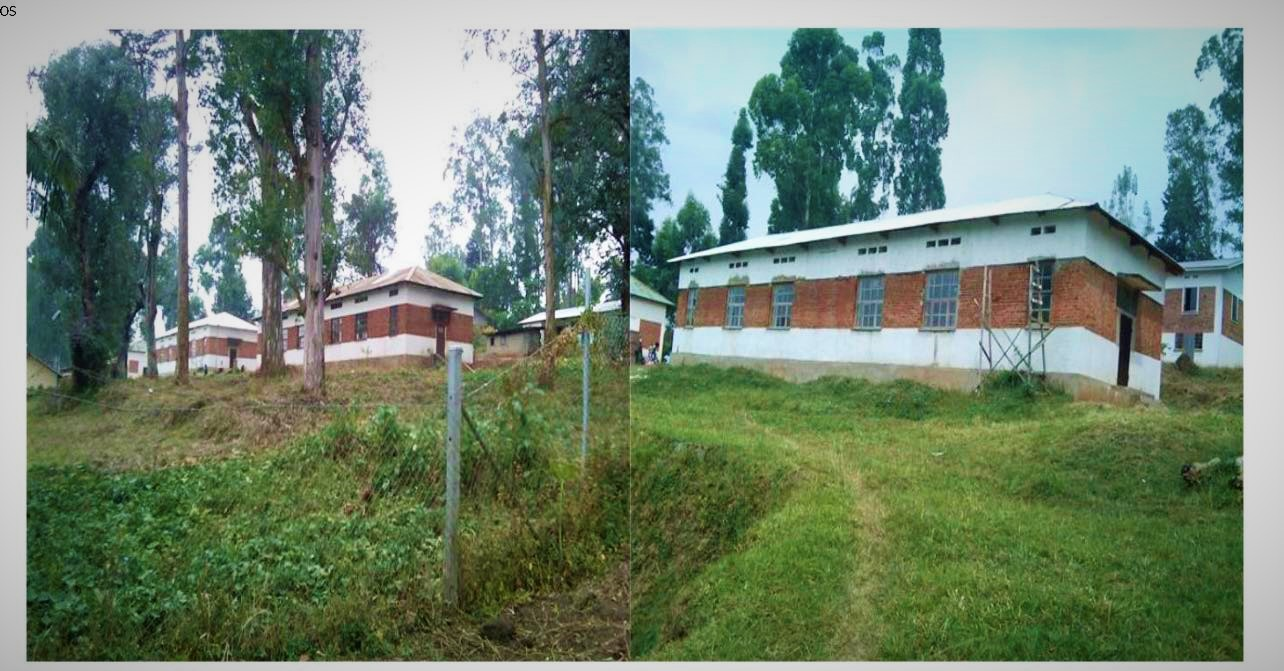
The Lemera Hospital, where the Lemera massacre took place

Additional violence erupted on 6 October 1996 in Kidoti, where Banyamulenge forces killed more than fifty civilians. Victims either died from shrapnel wounds or were executed, with some reportedly forced to dig their own mass graves. On the same day, in Lemera, Banyamulenge armed units carried out a massacre at the Lemera Hospital, killing 37 individuals, including two medical personnel, civilians, and soldiers of the Zairean Armed Forces (Forces Armées Zaïroises; FAZ) who were receiving treatment. The hospital was looted before the attackers withdrew.

On 18 October, the Alliance of Democratic Forces for the Liberation of Congo (Alliance des Forces Démocratiques pour la Libération du Congo, AFDL) was established under the leadership of Laurent-Désiré Kabila, with military backing from the RPA and FAB. At the time, the UNHCR estimated that Uvira Territory hosted approximately 219,466 refugees, two-thirds of whom were Burundian nationals. These individuals were dispersed across eleven camps along the Ruzizi River, leaving them highly exposed to armed attacks. On the same day as the AFDL's formation, AFDL and RPA units launched a coordinated military offensive, resulting in the deaths of at least 88 civilians in Kiliba, 15 of whom were later buried in Uvira. Additional atrocities were committed in Bwegera, where at least 51 civilians were executed by AFDL-RPA forces, prompting the International Committee of the Red Cross to organize mass burials. Two days later, on 20 October, AFDL, RPA, and FAB troops carried out simultaneous attacks on multiple refugee camps across Uvira Territory. At the Itara I and II camps near Luvungi, an estimated 100 Burundian and Rwandan refugees were killed. In Katala village, soldiers executed refugees attempting to flee, forcing residents to bury their bodies in mass graves. That same day, at the Kanganiro camp in Luvungi, the combined forces attacked with heavy weaponry, killing an unknown number of refugees, including approximately twenty patients in the camp's hospital. Other killings were reported in Luvingi, where soldiers murdered refugees who had sought shelter in the homes of Zairean civilians.

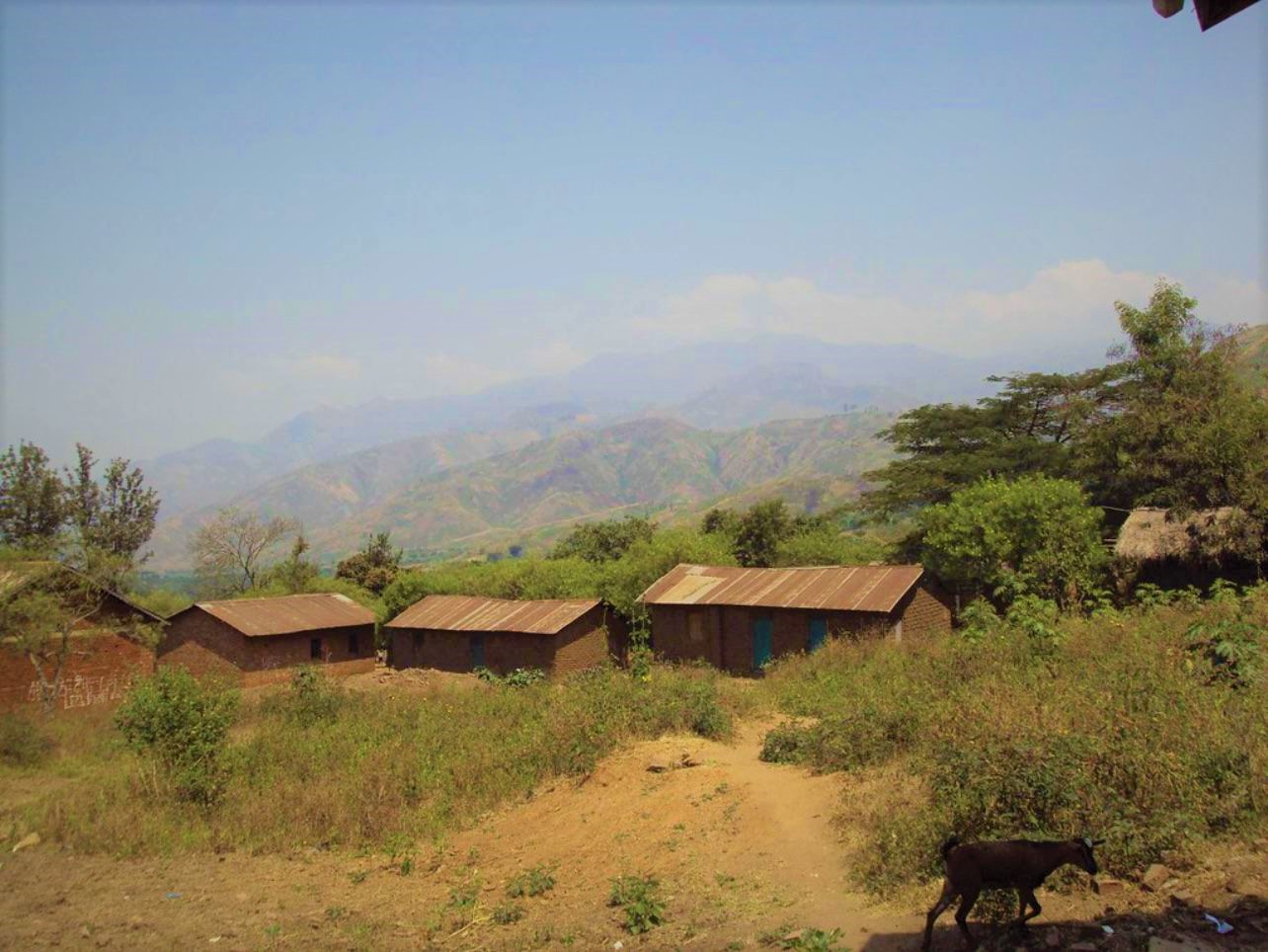
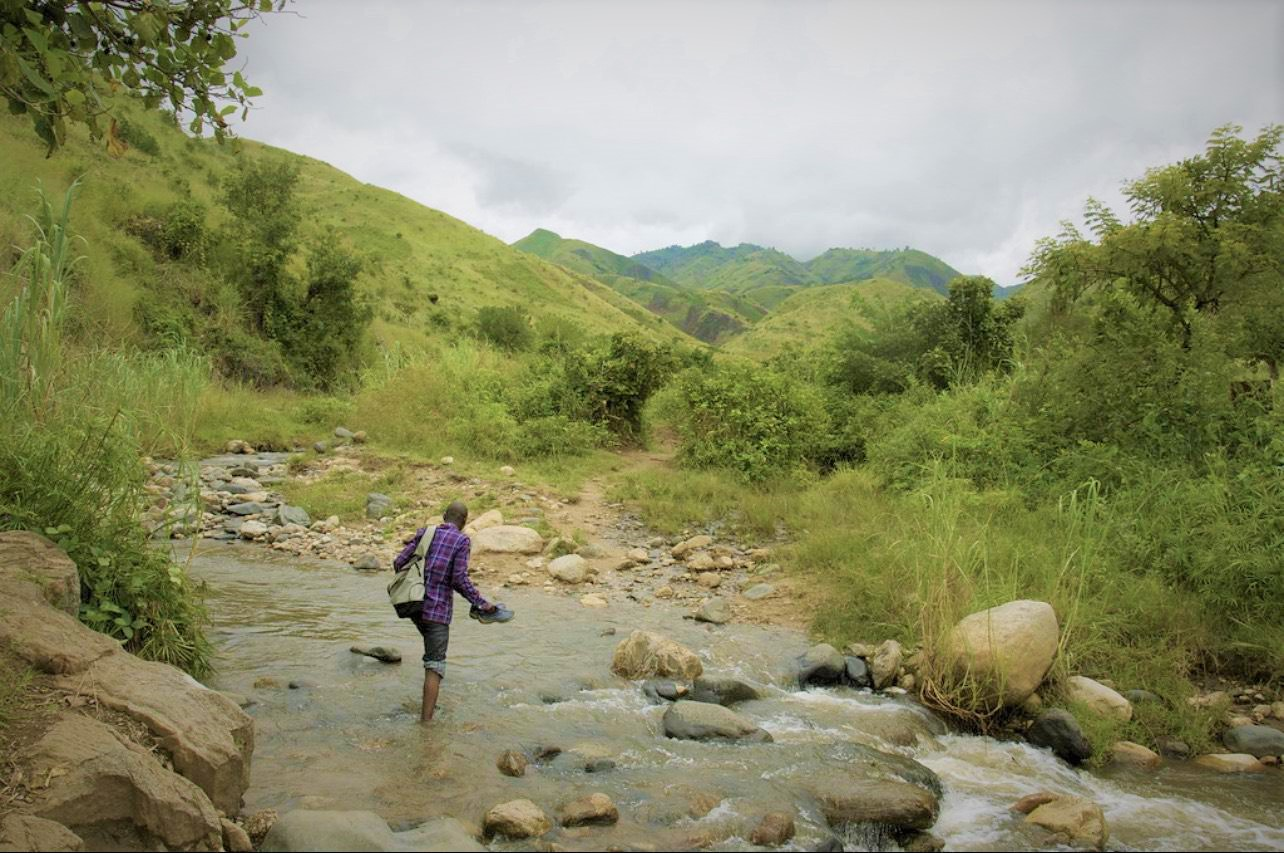
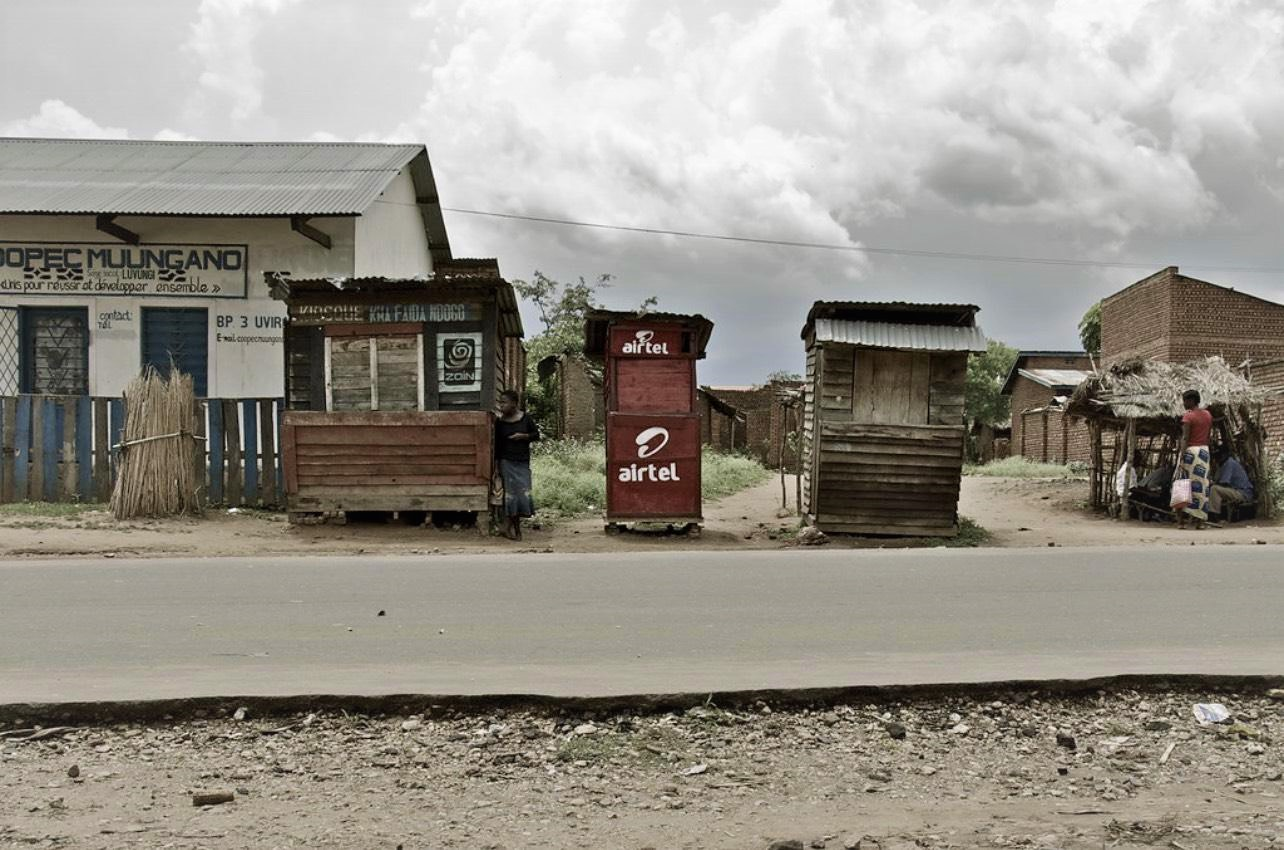
Lubarika village (left), along with Runingu (center), Rwenena, Kanganiro, and Luvungi (right), was among several key locations that hosted large numbers of refugees.

In Rubenga village, AFDL–RPA–FAB units killed an unspecified number of refugees and Zairean civilians fleeing toward Burundi, disposing of the bodies in the Ruzizi River. On 21 October, atrocities continued with attacks on Lubarika camp and village, resulting in the deaths of numerous Rwandan and Burundian refugees as well as Zairean civilians. Witnesses reported that the soldiers forced villagers to dig four large mass graves for the victims. In Kakumbukumbu, five kilometers from Lubarika, soldiers burned thirty refugees alive inside a house. The same day, the Luberizi camp, situated between Luberizi and Mutarule, was attacked with heavy weapons, leaving approximately 370 refugees dead. Soldiers threw bodies into pit latrines and killed several dozen additional civilians in the surrounding villages. More than sixty corpses were later discovered in nearby dwellings. On 24 October, the combined forces struck the Kagunga camp, killing an undetermined number of refugees. Witnesses reported seeing at least eight bodies, while additional killings occurred at Hongero village, one kilometer away, where soldiers targeted refugees fleeing alongside local Zaireans. During the night of 24–25 October 1996, the AFDL, RPA, and FAB captured the city of Uvira, effectively defeating FAZ throughout Uvira Territory. The fall of Uvira triggered a mass exodus of refugees, Burundians and Rwandans, who fled in multiple directions. Some escaped southward toward Fizi Territory, continuing into North Katanga, Tanzania, and Zambia, while others fled north through the Kabare and Walungu Territories. Many Burundian refugees attempted to return to their home country via the Ruzizi River, but were intercepted at Kiliba, where AFDL–RPA–FAB units reportedly executed refugees at the Kiliba Sugar Refinery and surrounding villages, including Ndunda, Ngendo, and Mwaba. On 25 October, soldiers killed an unknown number of refugees who had sought refuge inside abandoned dwellings in sectors 3 and 4 of the refinery complex.

Between 1–2 November, approximately 250 civilians, including over 200 refugees and around 30 Zaireans, were indiscriminately killed in Ndunda, a village near the Burundian border. Refugees had taken shelter there, hoping to be protected by the CNDD-FDD (National Council for the Defense of Democracy–Forces for the Defense of Democracy) militia, which was reportedly present in the area. During the attack, several refugees drowned in the Ruzizi River while attempting to flee. Zairean civilians from the village were also killed, accused by the attacking forces of harboring or collaborating with CNDD-FDD fighters. On 24 November, in the village of Mwaba, AFDL–RPA–FAB units burned alive 24 Burundian Hutu refugees who had previously resided in the Biriba camp. After entering the village, soldiers detained people found on-site, later releasing the Zairean civilians but imprisoning the Burundian refugees inside a house, which was then set on fire.

===== Mass killings under the guise of repatriation efforts (October–December 1996) =====
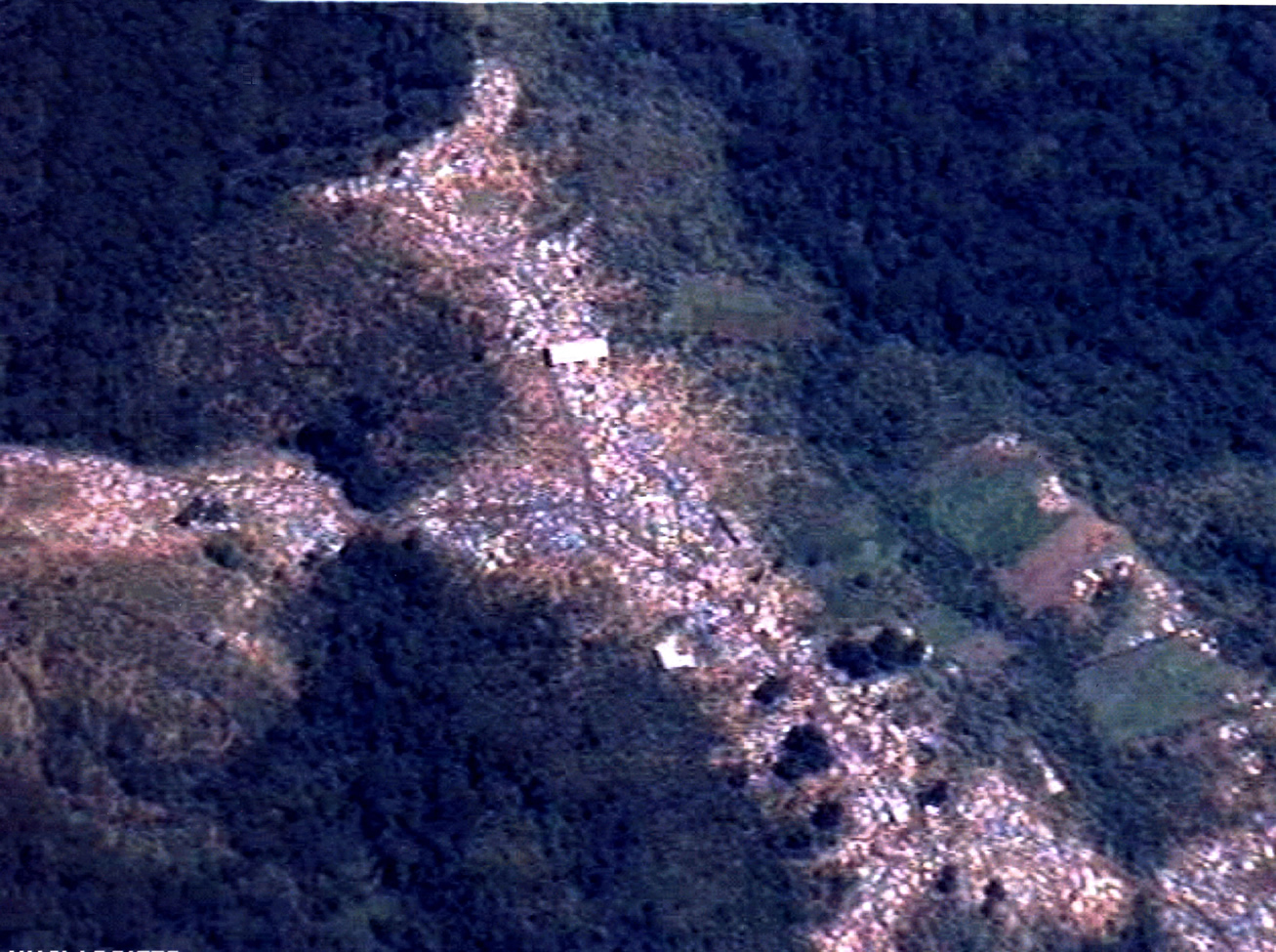
Aerial photograph of a Mihanda, Zaire refugee camp in 1996. Pictured are 500+ tents set up in the Mitumba Mountains.

In October 1996, AFDL–RPA–FAB joint units established a network of military checkpoints throughout the Ruzizi Plain and surrounding areas of Uvira and Fizi Territories. These checkpoints, strategically positioned in Bwegera, Sange, Luberizi, Kiliba, and at the entrances to Uvira, Makobola II, and the Rushima ravine, served as screening sites where civilians and refugees were intercepted under the pretext of repatriation. At these posts, soldiers reportedly separated people based on perceived nationality and ethnicity, identifying Rwandan and Burundian Hutus through indicators such as accent, physical appearance, and clothing. Those identified as Hutu were systematically executed on-site or in nearby areas. Numerous mass killings were carried out in this context, targeting refugees and local Zairean civilians accused of assisting them. One of the most documented atrocities happened on 22 October in the Rushima ravine, situated between Bwegera and Luberizi, when AFDL, RPA, and FAB units executed approximately 550 Rwandan Hutu refugees who had escaped from the Luberizi and Rwenena camps. Between 27 October and 1 November, other killings took place in the exact location, as additional groups of refugees, lured under the false promise of organized repatriation, were assembled and executed en masse. Subsequent massacres were recorded at Kahororo, near sector 7 of the Kiliba Sugar Refinery, where an undetermined number of refugees apprehended in surrounding villages were summarily executed. These events were part of a coordinated campaign to eliminate surviving Hutu refugee populations in the region.

On 29 October, approximately 220 male refugees were executed near the church of the 8th Communauté des Églises de Pentecôte au Zaïre (CEPZA), now CEPAC (Communauté des Églises de Pentecôte en Afrique Centrale), in Luberizi. Witnesses reported that soldiers deceived the refugees into believing they were being processed for repatriation, only to separate the men from the women and children before executing them with gunfire and bayonets. Their bodies were buried in mass graves adjacent to the church. On 3 November, 72 Rwandan refugees were burned alive by AFDL–RPA–FAB forces at the COTONCO headquarters near Bwegera, after being detained under similar pretexts. On 13 November, about 100 Burundian refugees were executed in the Ngendo village. On 8 December, in Rukogero, soldiers executed 13 male refugees from a group of approximately 200 to 300 people who had fled the Kibogoye camp. The women and girls were released, while the men and boys were killed and their bodies discarded into pit latrines near the 8th CEPZA church. Another massacre occurred on 12 December in the village of Ruzia, where 15 people, including refugees from the Luberizi–Mutarule camps and local Zairean civilians, were killed during a military sweep aimed at locating hidden refugees. Some victims were burned alive inside houses, while others were shot and buried in three mass graves. One of the most severe incidents took place on 22 December 1996 along the banks of the Ruzizi River, also in Ruzia, where joint AFDL–RPA–FAB forces killed at least 150 people, most of them refugees who had survived the Runingu camp attack. The victims were executed after being discovered in nearby forests, and their bodies were burned two days later. Some reports suggested that the total death toll could have reached 600. In May 1997, AFDL and RPA units opened fire on a civilian demonstration in Uvira, killing 126 people protesting the murder of eight civilians by members of the new AFDL security forces. Following the massacre, soldiers sealed off the area and buried most of the bodies in two mass graves located in the "Biens mal acquis" district, where the troops had established their headquarters. Over subsequent days, residents recovered and buried eight additional bodies.

==== Atrocities in other territories (1996–1997) ====
Following their capture of Uvira Territory, AFDL–RPA–FAB forces advanced into Fizi Territory. In late October 1996, 27 civilians, including women and children, were killed in Mboko, the administrative center of the Tanganyika Sector. The victims, attempting to cross Lake Tanganyika by canoe to reach Tanzania, were shot or drowned during the assault. On 28 October, AFDL and RPA troops attacked Abala-Ngulube village, located between the Moyen Plateau and Haut Plateau near Minembwe, killing 101 civilians. The victims were members of the Bembe ethnic group and adherents of the Third Malikia wa Ubembe Church, who had taken refuge inside their church building. Many were burned alive when the soldiers set the structure on fire. The attack was reportedly carried out in retaliation for an ambush by Bembe armed groups, which had killed two AFDL–RPA soldiers in the same area days earlier.

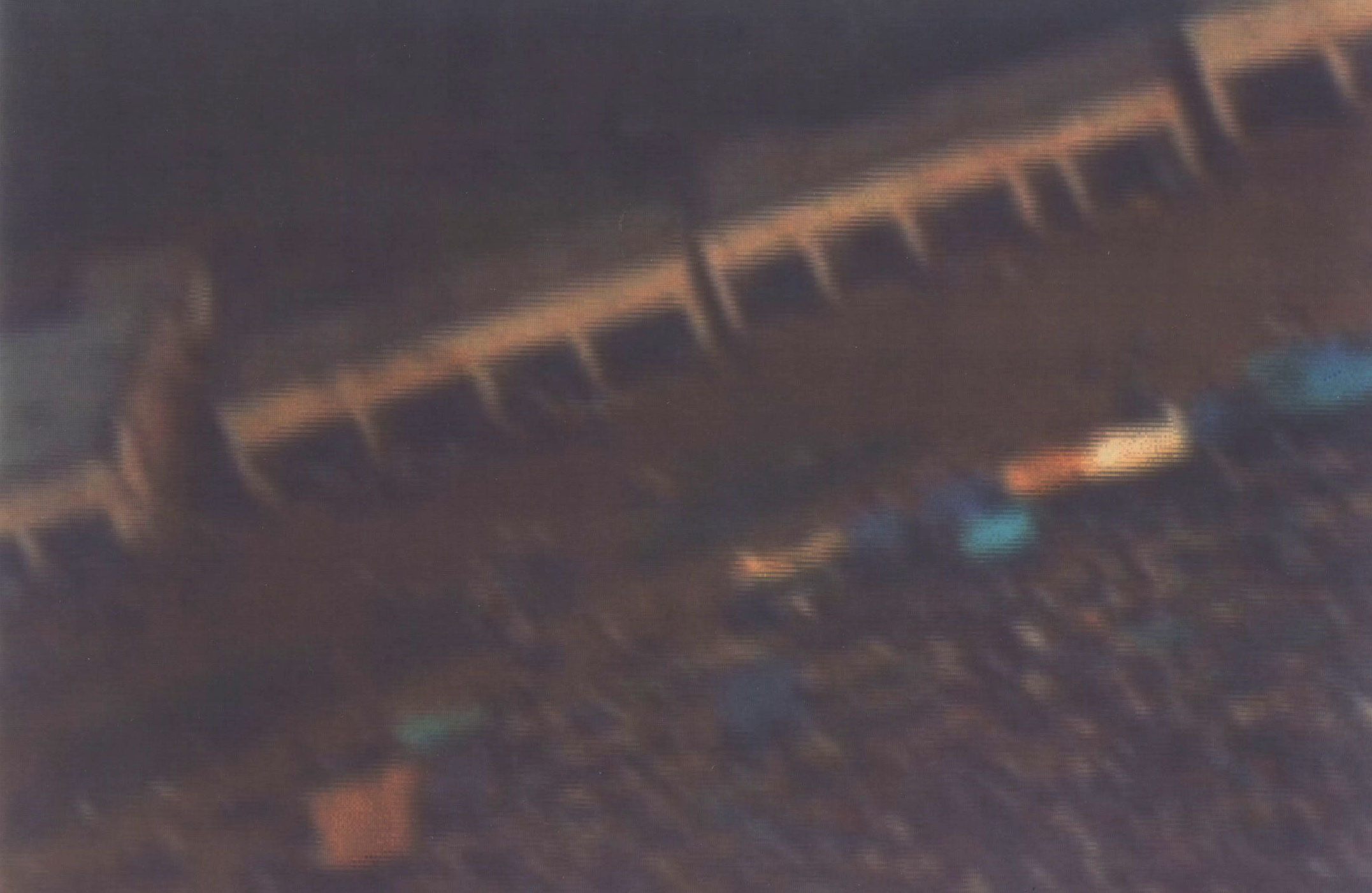
Aerial photograph taken by the U.S. Navy on 20 November 1996, showing refugees in the vicinity of Bukavu, Zaire.

During 1996, Walungu Territory hosted part of a vast refugee settlement system known as the "Bukavu camps", which sheltered approximately 307,499 refugees, mostly Rwandan and Burundian nationals, across the Walungu, Kabare, and Kalehe Territories. As AFDL–RPA forces advanced toward Bukavu, these camps became primary targets of military assaults. In mid-October 1996, AFDL–RPA troops killed at least 130 civilians in Kaziba Chiefdom, including 36 civilians executed on 16 October in the Kaziba commercial center. Their bodies were interred in a mass grave near the local Mennonite church. Subsequent attacks in the Namushuaga–Lukube area involved the killing of additional civilians with spears and machetes, while at least 11 people were murdered in the Cihumba groupement, where displaced residents had sought refuge. The soldiers also looted hospitals, shops, and homes, and destroyed a small hydroelectric facility in the area. On 20 October, AFDL–RPA forces attacked the Kamanyola refugee camp, killing an undetermined number of refugees and Zairean civilians, whose bodies were thrown into pit latrines. The following day, on 21 October, AFDL–RPA units executed Rwandan and Burundian refugees at Nyarubale in the Kalunga hills as they fled toward Bukavu. Victims who failed Swahili language tests or were identified by Rwandan or Burundian accents were systematically executed. On 26 October, between 200 and 600 people, most of them women, children, and the elderly, were ambushed and killed between Nyantende and Walungu-Centre. Two days later, on 28 October, five refugees were executed by AFDL–RPA soldiers in Lwakabiri, west of Bukavu. After the fall of Bukavu on 29 October, the AFDL–RPA coalition continued targeting northern refugee camps, notably INERA-Kashusha. On 2 November, a large-scale assault on the INERA–Kashusha camp left hundreds of refugees dead. Later, on 22 November, AFDL–RPA forces massacred between 500 and 800 refugees at Chimanga camp, having deceived them with false promises of food and repatriation.

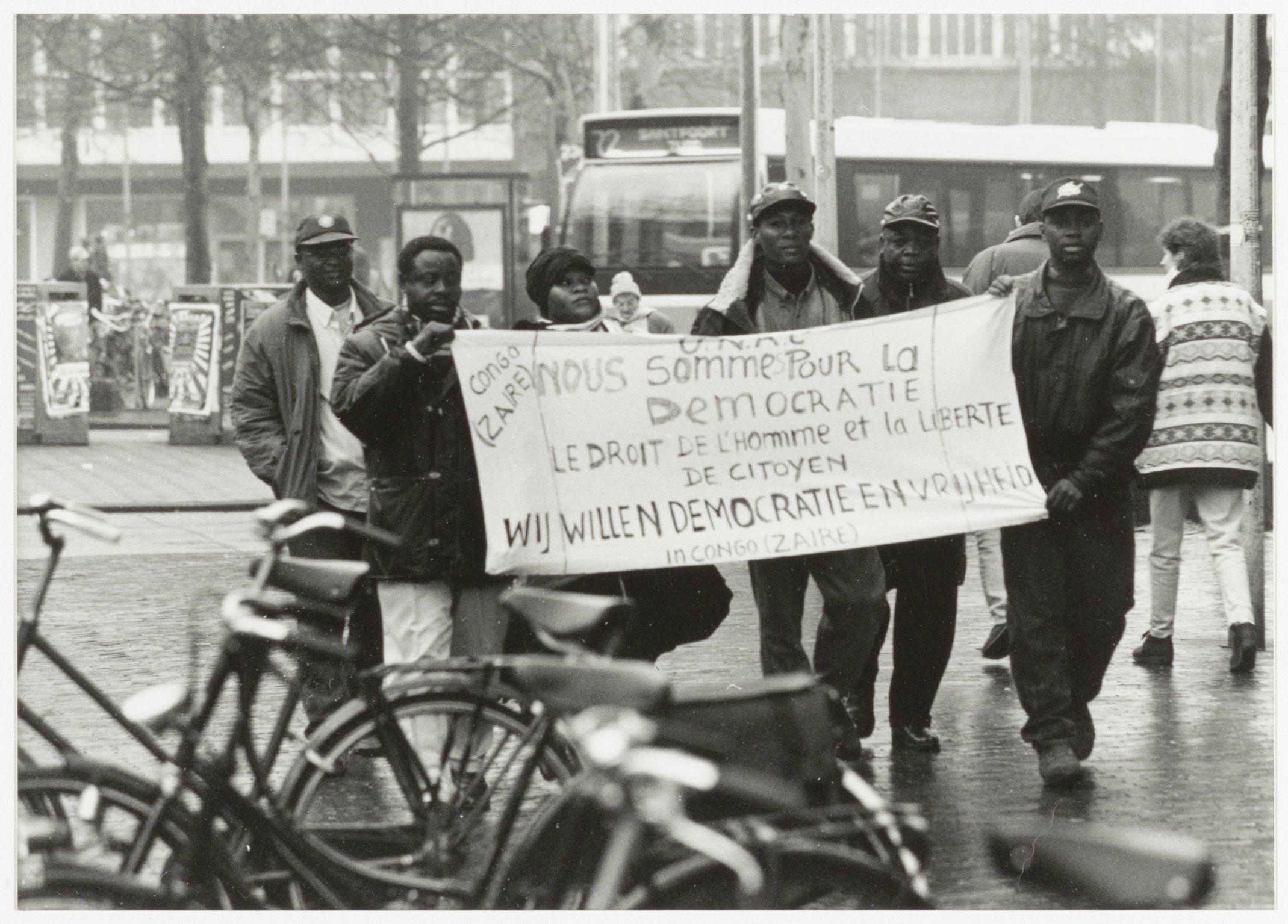
Zairean refugees demonstrate at Stationsplein, a square in Amsterdam, Netherlands, for democracy and freedom in Zaire. Circa 18 January 1997.

In early 1997, reports indicated continued torture and executions of refugees along the Bukavu–Walungu road, where individuals were arrested, beaten, and killed, often with knives or machetes. On 14 March 1997, AFDL and RPA units killed nine civilians, including a child, at the VIPAM project concession in Lwana, Kalehe Territory. The victims, laborers from Shabunda and Kabare Territories, were accused of aiding fleeing Hutu refugees. They were executed with knives and machetes. After Laurent-Désiré Kabila assumed power in May 1997 and renamed the country the Democratic Republic of the Congo, violence in the east persisted, culminating in a large-scale massacre in July 1997 carried out by soldiers of the newly formed Congolese Armed Forces (Forces Armées Congolaises; FAC), alongside RPA units, in the Kazumba, Talama, Mukungu, and Kabanga villages, located along the border between Katanga and South Kivu provinces. Between 500 and 800 people were killed over several days. The attacks were conducted in retaliation for an assault by the Jeshi la Jua militia ("Sun Army"), a local resistance group opposing the new government, which had earlier killed one FAC soldier. The reprisals indiscriminately targeted both combatants and civilians. Later that year, on the night of 22–23 December, FAC and RPA soldiers executed 22 civilians at the Bulambika commercial center in Bunyakiri, accusing them of supporting Mayi-Mayi, who had briefly occupied the area.

==== Kalehe Territory ====
Following the fall of Bukavu and the subsequent destruction of the refugee camps north of the city, thousands of Rwandan and Burundian Hutu refugees fled northward toward North Kivu Province. Their movements primarily followed two routes: one passing through the Kahuzi-Biéga National Park en route to Bunyakiri and Hombo, and the other along the Goma road via Nyabibwe. The routes soon became sites of large-scale killings as refugees who attempted to reach North Kivu via Nyabibwe were trapped between converging AFDL and RPA units advancing from Goma and Bukavu. By mid-November 1996, units of the ex-FAR/Interahamwe, retreating Rwandan Hutu combatants, allegedly killed an unknown number of refugees in Nyabibwe. Most of the victims were elderly, sick, or disabled persons who lacked the strength to continue fleeing. Eyewitness accounts reported that the attackers used rockets and incendiary weapons, setting ablaze the houses and vehicles in which refugees were confined, killing many by fire or explosions. Some testimonies suggested that certain refugees, fearing imminent capture and reprisal by AFDL–RPA forces, requested to be killed by the ex-FAR/Interahamwe rather than fall into enemy hands, though this claim could not be independently verified by the United Nations Mapping Report. The majority of the refugees who escaped from Nyabibwe moved toward Bunyakiri and Hombo through the Kalehe Territory's Hauts Plateaux, establishing temporary encampments at Shanje and Numbi. Pursued by AFDL and RPA troops, many were subsequently killed in Chebumba, Lumbishi, and other settlements across the territory. On 21 November 1996, AFDL–RPA units carried out one of the deadliest massacres in the region, killing several hundred refugees and injuring hundreds more in and around the Shanje makeshift camp and the adjacent Rukiga bamboo forest. Witnesses reported that refugees were killed by gunfire, rockets, and shrapnel, while others, particularly the elderly, children, and the infirm, were executed along the roadside as they attempted to flee.

After the initial assault, soldiers ordered surviving refugees to assemble and march in a column, ostensibly for repatriation to Rwanda. Once they began moving, the troops opened fire on the column, killing many along the route. The following day, 22 November, AFDL–RPA soldiers attacked and killed an unknown number of survivors from the Shanje camp in Lumbishi. The Rukiga bamboo forest became another site of mass killings as troops hunted down refugees attempting to escape through the terrain. Refugees who managed to flee from Shanje and Lumbishi continued toward Hombo, where they joined survivors from the INERA–Kashusha camp. Between 2–4 November, as refugees attempted to cross Kahuzi-Biéga National Park to reach North Kivu, AFDL–RPA forces reportedly ambushed and killed an undetermined number of them within the park boundaries. Due to restricted access and the remoteness of the area, the exact number of victims remains unknown.

==== Shabunda Territory ====
Following the fall of Uvira and Bukavu, Shabunda Territory became a central transit zone for Rwandan and Burundian Hutu refugees fleeing northward through South Kivu's dense forests. Many survivors from the Uvira and Bukavu refugee camps attempted to escape via the old Bukavu–Kindu road, passing through Chimanga, Kigulube, Katshungu, and Shabunda. By mid-December 1996, approximately 38,000 refugees were registered in three makeshift camps near Shabunda, Makese I, Makese II, and Kabakita (also referred to as Kabakita I, II, and III). An undetermined number of those who lagged or fell ill during the journey were killed by AFDL and RPA troops along the main routes of the territory. Between January and February 1997, numerous massacres were reported in Mukenge, Baliga, and Kigulube villages. Although sporadic clashes took place between AFDL–RPA forces, remnants of FAZ, and ex-FAR/Interahamwe units retreating westward, the majority of victims were unarmed refugees and local civilians. On 5 February, AFDL and RPA units reportedly killed around 500 refugees at the metal bridge over the Ulindi River. Most of the victims had fled the Kabakita camps as the soldiers approached. After the massacre, villagers were forced to dump the bodies into the river and clean the bridge. Survivors were taken toward Kabatika, where they were executed the following day. Refugees who escaped these attacks attempted to reach Kindu, while others, believing that the UNHCR had reopened operations at Kigulube, turned back toward Bukavu. Thousands of refugees traveled in small groups of 50 to 100 people, moving through the forests under extreme deprivation and exposure. By this time, AFDL–RPA forces controlled most of Shabunda Territory, having established a dense network of checkpoints along key routes.

From February to April 1997, AFDL–RPA forces conducted a systematic campaign of extermination against refugees moving through the Kigulube–Shabunda axis, including along the 156-kilometre road linking the two towns. On 13 February, AFDL–RPA soldiers massacred between 70 and 180 refugees with machetes in Mpwe, near Kigulube. Refugees were assembled under the pretext of reconciliation efforts to "resolve the Hutu–Tutsi problem". Soldiers invited them to rest and eat before leading small groups into a house, where they were killed one by one. Those attempting to flee were shot. The victims were buried in a mass grave behind the house. Two days later, on 15 February, the same forces killed approximately 200 refugees at two locations, 4–7 kilometres from Kigulube. In one instance, around sixty refugees were locked inside a house that was then set on fire, their bodies later interred in mass graves.

Between 30 March and early April, several hundred refugees were killed across Katshungu, Ivela, Balika, Lulingu, and Keisha, as well as at the Ulindi bridge, often in the presence of senior RPA officers. The victims, primarily women and children, were mainly survivors from the Chimanga camp who had sought refuge in Katshungu. Humanitarian organizations were barred from accessing the area for several days, but later reported cleanup operations and visible human remains scattered along the road. Between January and March, thousands of refugees died of hunger, exhaustion, and disease while attempting to cross the forests between Kigulube and Shabunda. Weak, malnourished, and disoriented, these groups received no humanitarian assistance, as aid agencies were prohibited from operating beyond a 30-kilometre radius of Bukavu. AFDL and RPA officials required that government "facilitators" accompany all humanitarian missions. These people were accused of providing military intelligence on the whereabouts of refugees, enabling soldiers to intercept and kill them before aid could reach them. During the same period, AFDL and RPA troops forbade Zairean civilians from assisting refugees and reportedly executed an unknown number of residents accused of helping displaced persons or collaborating with international NGOS and UN agencies. The total number of deaths from starvation, exhaustion, and killings is impossible to determine, though estimates suggest several hundred to several thousand victims. Between 26 and 29 April 1997, AFDL and RPA soldiers abducted, detained, and tortured approximately fifty Rwandan Hutu minors and nine adult refugees near Kavumu Airport. The victims had been taken from the Lwiro Processing Centre for child refugees. They were confined in a shipping container, where they were subjected to severe beatings and inhumane treatment. Soldiers also assaulted medical personnel at the Lwiro centre, accusing them of aiding refugees. On 29 April, following international pressure, the victims were released to the UNHCR, who documented their testimony. The survivors reported that soldiers were using multiple containers at the airport as makeshift detention and torture facilities for captured refugees.

=== Second Congo War ===
From late 1997 onwards, the relationship between President Laurent-Désiré Kabila, Rwanda and the Tutsi soldiers present in the AFDL deteriorated. Laurent-Désiré Kabila's government faced multiple accusations of marginalizing Tutsi political factions, excluding them from his administration, and displaying preferential treatment toward his Katanga clan. In July 1998, driven by fears of a coup d'état, President Laurent-Désiré Kabila relieved Rwandan General James Kabarebe of his position as Chief of Staff of the AFDL, while also issuing an order for the Rwandan Patriotic Army (RPA) soldiers to withdraw from Congolese territory. In response, on 2 August 1998, a faction of Tutsi soldiers mutinied and, with the assistance of the AFDL, the Banyamulenge militias, the Ugandan army (Ugandan People's Defence Force; UPDF), and the Burundi army (Forces Armées Burundaises; FAB), launched a rebellion aimed at overthrowing President Laurent-Désiré Kabila. Within a few weeks, this coalition formed the Rassemblement Congolais pour la Démocratie (RCD) and gained control over major urban centers in North and South Kivu, Orientale Province, North Katanga, and even managed to penetrate into the Équateur Province. The war resulted in wide-scale displacement, famine, and a staggering loss of lives. Numerous rebel groups and militias emerged, further intensifying the violence and leading to pervasive human rights violations, including large-scale massacres and incidents of sexual violence. On August 6, 1998, factions of the ANC/RPA/FAB perpetrated a massacre, claiming the lives of numerous civilians in Uvira, in South Kivu. As civilians sought shelter or attempted to flee the combat zone, they fell victim to the FAC in confrontations, resulting in hundreds of fatalities. Moreover, on the same day, members of the ANC, the armed wing of the RCD rebel, killed 13 people, including the chief of the Kiringye area, in the village of Lwiburule in South Kivu. Another massacre unfolded as elements of the ANC/RPA claimed the lives of 15 individuals in the vicinity of Kivovo, Kigongo, and Kalungwe, all situated in South Kivu. The victims suffered from dagger wounds or were shot near the primary port in Kalundu and at the facilities of SEP Congo. On August 24, 1998, RCD forces and Rwandan soldiers unleashed a massacre in Kasika and neighboring villages in South Kivu, resulting in the deaths of more than 1,000 people, as reported by the United Nations Mapping Report. The majority of the recovered bodies, predominantly women and children, were discovered on the 60-kilometer journey from Kilungutwe village to Kasika. Prior to their murders, the women were subjected to rape followed by brutal disembowelment using daggers. From December 30, 1998, to January 2, 1999, RCD forces committed another massacre, claiming the lives of over 800 civilians, primarily belonging to the Babembe community, in the small village of Makobola in South Kivu. Many victims endured machete attacks or were shot at close range, while others met their demise through burning or drowning in nearby rivers. Infants and young children were callously thrown into deep pit latrines, left to perish, while adults who dared to disobey orders and attempted to escape were met with bullets. On May 14, 2000, members of the ANC conducted a massacre resulting in 300 deaths in the village of Katogota in South Kivu.

The war officially ended in 2003 with the signing of the Sun City Agreement, which aimed to establish a transitional government and promote peace and stability in the DRC. However, sporadic violence and conflicts in the region persisted even after the official end of the war. In an interview with Catholic charity Aid to the Church in Need, in 2024, the Vicar General of the Archdiocese of Bukavu, Floribert Bashimbe, lamented that "for 30 years, we have been in a cycle of violence and eternal new beginnings. One knows when the war starts, but not when it will end".

==== War and human rights ====
The Banyamulenge, who actively aligned themselves with the AFDL and RCD factions throughout the duration of the Second Congo War, have been subject to widespread disdain among many Congolese due to their alleged involvement in a range of nefarious activities. These accusations include launching assaults on refugee camps and densely populated villages, engaging in civilian executions, and orchestrating acts of terrorism targeting Zairian civilians across various regions of South and North Kivu. Consequently, a considerable number of Congolese view the Banyamulenge as unwelcome intruders encroaching upon their native territories, thereby intensifying the deep-rooted animosity directed towards them.

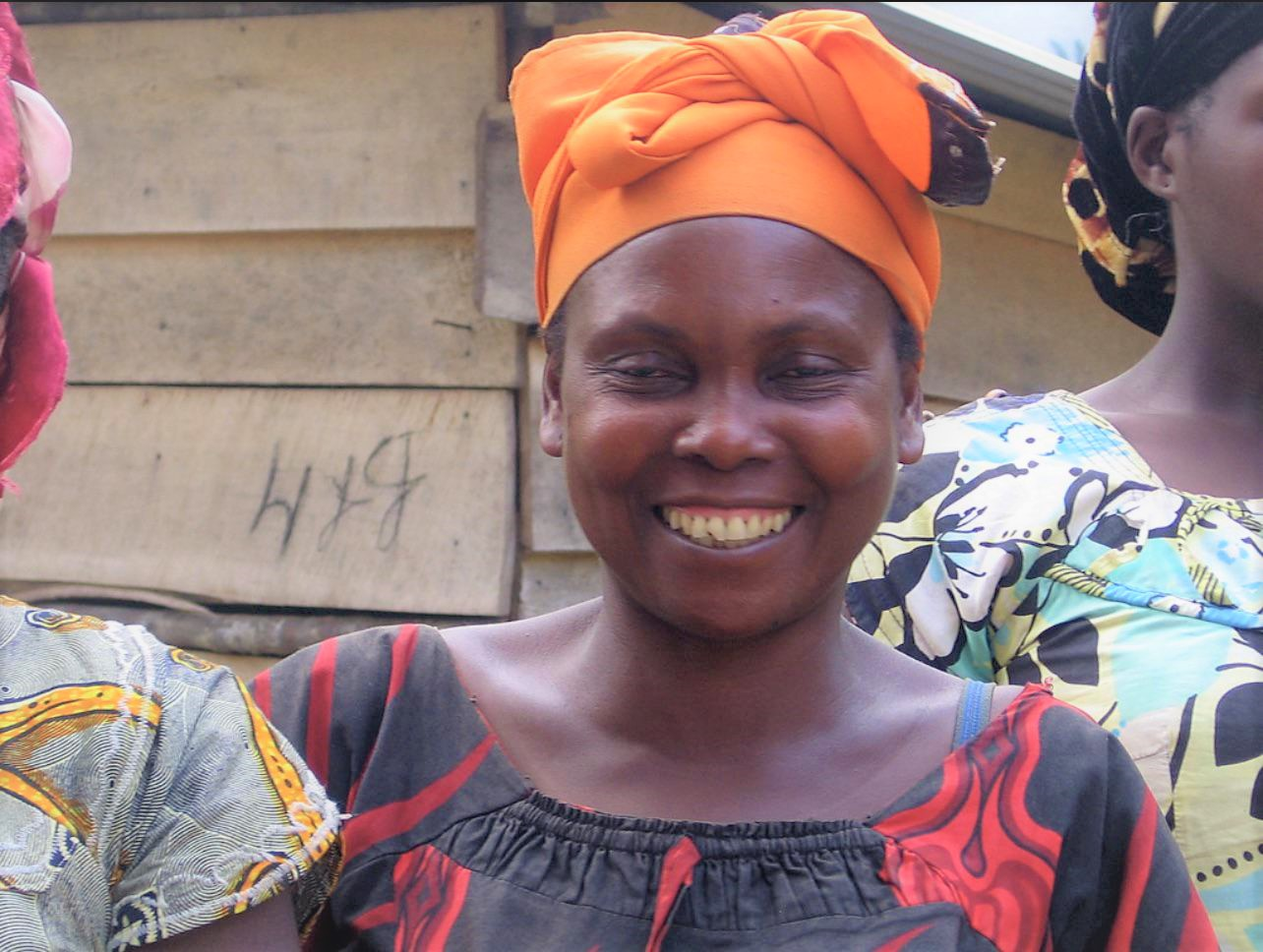
Victims of sexual violence in the town Bunyakiri in the Kalehe Territory of the South Kivu Province, August 2010

The UN estimates that in 2005, approximately 45,000 women were raped in South Kivu. It forms various armed groups, including the Rwandan-backed armed groups, Banyamulenge armed groups, Raia Mutomboki, Mai-Mai militias, ADF (Allied Democratic Forces) and FDLR. There have been numerous accounts and allegations of sexual violence perpetrated by members of the Congolese army (Forces Armées de la République Démocratique du Congo; FARDC) in eastern Congo. The 10th Military Region of the newly established Congolese military, led by General Pacifique Masunzu, whose undisciplined former factional soldiers are responsible for human rights violations due to a continuing culture of impunity for military personnel, compounded by challenging living conditions, inadequate remuneration, and insufficient training. Masunzu is Munyamulenge who broke with the Rwandan-backed Rally for Congolese Democracy (RCD) back in 2003. He was formerly commander of the 122nd Brigade in the Minembwe area, who in 2005 rebelled against the authorities in defense of the Congolese Banyamulenge, against harassment and physical abuse. Also previously former second in command of 4th Military Region in Kasai-Occidental. Africa Confidential said in 2011 that he 'clearly remains implacably opposed to the Rwandan government'. His deputy Colonel Baudouin Nakabaka is a former Mai-Mai fighter with close links to the FDLR. In July 2007, United Nations human rights expert Yakin Erturk called the situation in South Kivu the worst she has ever seen in four years as the global body's special investigator for violence against women. Sexual violence throughout Congo is "rampant," she said, blaming rebel groups, the armed forces and national police. Her statement included that "Frequently women are shot or stabbed in their genital organs, after they are raped. Women, who survived months of enslavement, told me that their tormentors had forced them to eat excrement or the human flesh of murdered relatives".

In June 2014, around 35 people were killed in an attack in the South Kivu village of Mutarule. The attack was apparently part of dispute over cattle.

On 7 August 2015 the 2015 South Kivu earthquake, a magnitude 5.8 earthquake, struck 35 km (22 mi) north-northeast of Kabare at a depth of 12.0 km (7.5 mi). One policeman was killed. On 16 July 2020, the Ngumino and Twiganeho militias of the Banyamulenge community perpetrated the Kipupu massacre, which claimed the lives of 220 people in South Kivu village of Kipupu, as reported by provincial lawmakers.

== Economy ==
=== Agriculture ===
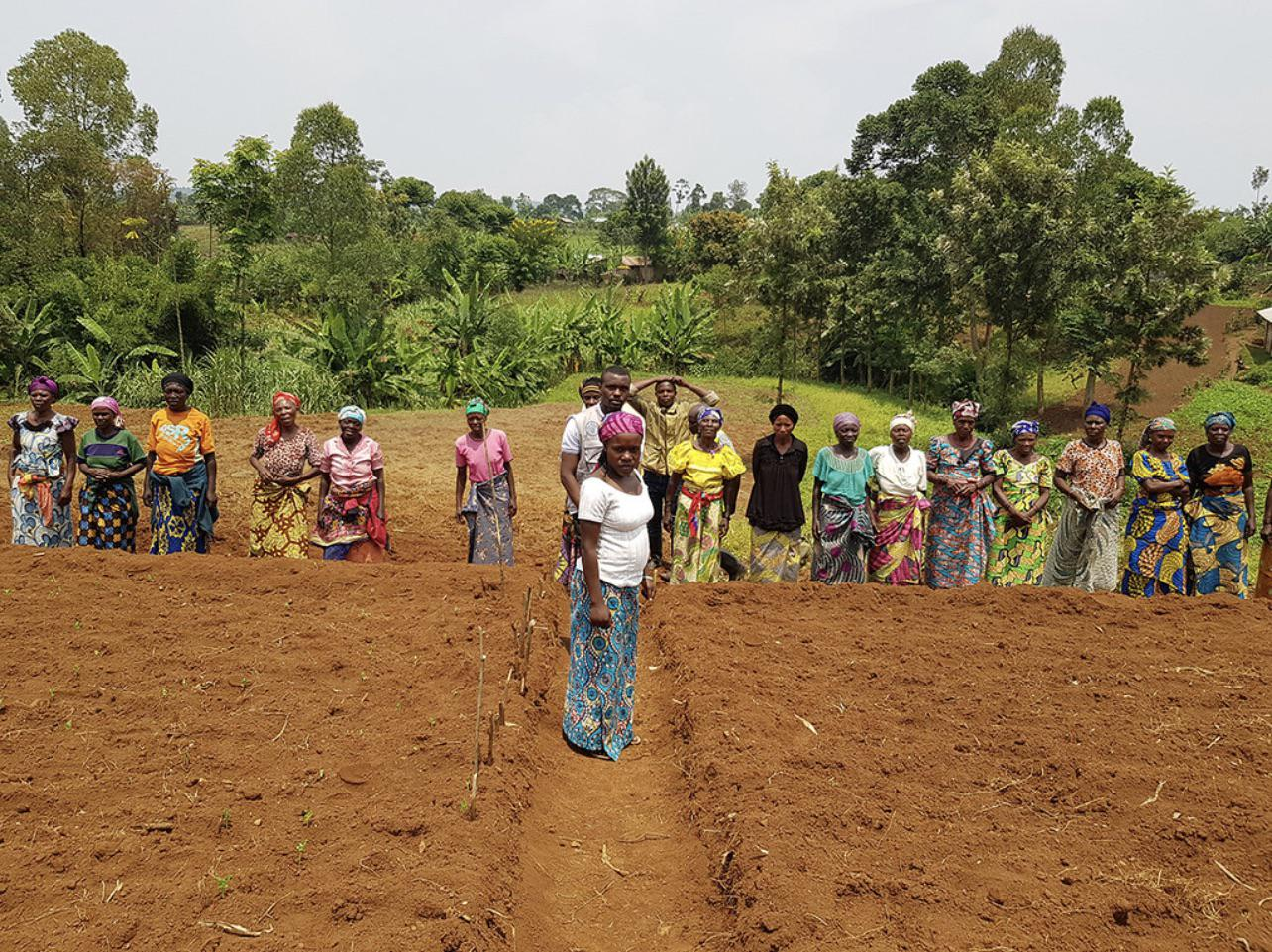
Farmers in the Kasheke field, Kalehe Territory

Approximately 87% of the population depends on agriculture for their livelihoods, making farming the dominant economic activity and providing a substantial labor force for agricultural work. Women comprise a significant portion of this workforce. In 2008, agriculture contributed about 63% of the province's gross domestic product (GDP), forming part of a broader 66% share for the primary sector, ahead of services (22%) and the tertiary sector (8%). South Kivu's fertile soils, particularly in the Fizi, Mwenga, Shabunda, and Uvira Territories, sustain a wide range of subsistence and cash crops. Food crops such as cassava, beans, sweet potato, maize, rice, bananas, tubers, various fruits, and vegetables are cultivated throughout the region, while industrial crops include coffee, tea, rubber, cinchona, cocoa, cotton, palm oil, sugar cane, tobacco, soybeans, sorghum, and pyrethrum. Cassava stands out as the dominant staple, cultivated by the majority of smallholder farmers.

Historically, South Kivu was a major producer and exporter of agricultural products, including sugar, cotton, tea, cinchona, coffee, and livestock, as well as food crops such as bananas, potatoes, sorghum, and millet, which were supplied to other regions of the Democratic Republic of the Congo. During the colonial and early post-independence eras, robusta and arabica coffee, tea, and cinchona formed the basis of a thriving plantation-based agricultural economy. However, this modern agricultural sector deteriorated following the Zairianization policies of the 1970s, leading to the mismanagement, abandonment, or conversion of plantations into subsistence plots, while many processing factories, such as those for coffee, tea, and palm oil, were closed, dismantled, or left inoperative due to neglect, insecurity, and poor maintenance.

Agriculture remains largely traditional and undercapitalized, with limited access to agricultural subsidies and credit facilities. Unlike regions such as the European Union, where programs like the Common Agricultural Policy (CAP) provide substantial government assistance, farmers in South Kivu operate without any institutional financial support. Farmers who resort to small loans, often obtained from local lenders, cooperatives, or village associations, incur additional financial costs, which are reflected in their agricultural income as interest expenses. In certain highland territories, farmers cultivating coffee and sugar cane are subject to a fixed local tax, administered through the chiefdom system, based on the number of fields under cultivation. According to agronomists, this measure, designed by local authorities to promote a shift toward food crop production deemed more beneficial to community food security than industrial crops, also includes the imposition of additional taxes on the sale of agricultural products.

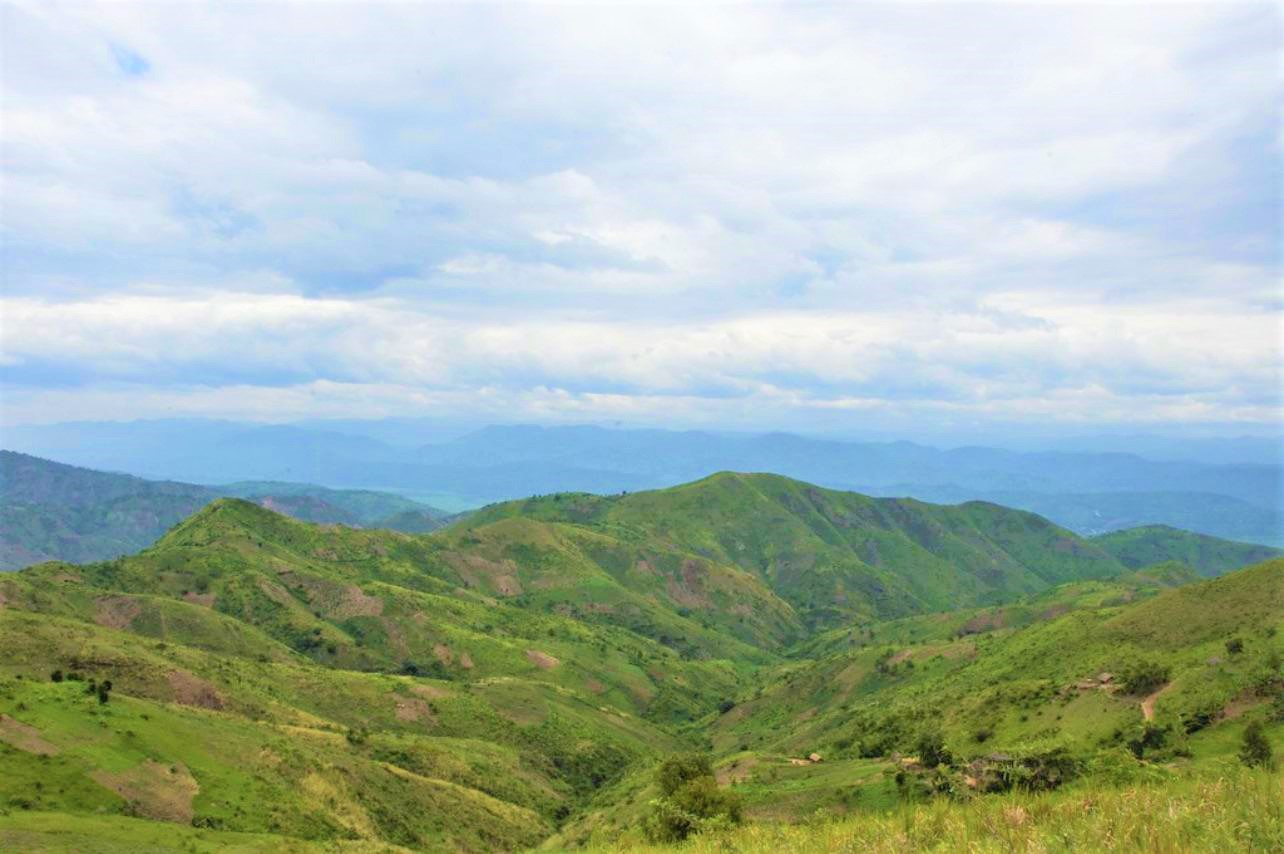
Kamanyola high plateau situated in the Ruzizi Plain within the Ngweshe Chiefdom

Over 99% of farms in the province are small-scale, with an average landholding of just 0.42 hectares, ranging from 0.50 hectares in Kalehe Territory to a low of 0.20 hectares in Kabare Territory. Large-scale estates constitute less than 1% of total farms, though their average size exceeds 90 hectares, with estates in Kalehe Territory averaging over 126 hectares and those in Kabare Territory surpassing 75 hectares. Typically, farming households in the mountainous regions cultivate between 0.35 and 1 hectare, compared to the national average of 1 to 1.5 hectares per farm. The limited landholdings in these areas are primarily attributed to population pressure and land appropriation by elites who sell plots illicitly. Much of the arable land is owned by a small elite group, including businesspeople, political figures, military officers, and other notables, who exploit landless peasants by compelling them to work on large plantations to meet their own food needs.

Land is acquired in South Kivu through various channels such as inheritance, renting, sharecropping, buying, and customary or state-endorsed donations. Farmers often acquire land through rental or sharecropping agreements made directly with landowners without state oversight, while inheritance, rooted in local customs, involves succession and formal recognition of heirs. Land can also be accessed via state concessions, which require the formal purchase and registration of property, or through customary allocations granted by traditional leaders. In mountainous areas, the mwami allocates land to his subjects, while in forested regions, this role falls to the clan chief after family consultations. Private land transactions can occur with or without official land titles. When state land is involved, the process must go through public administrative channels to legalize ownership, whereas private land may not require such formalities. Among the customary systems, the kalinzi allows the mwami to allocate land as a symbolic gift or recognition, while the bwasa serves as a localized form of tenancy widely used in Bushi. In Kabare Territory, many farmers have taken legal steps to protect their land rights by obtaining Land Titles or Customary Land Certificates (Certificat foncier coutumier) from the mwami.

=== Livestock farming and fishing ===
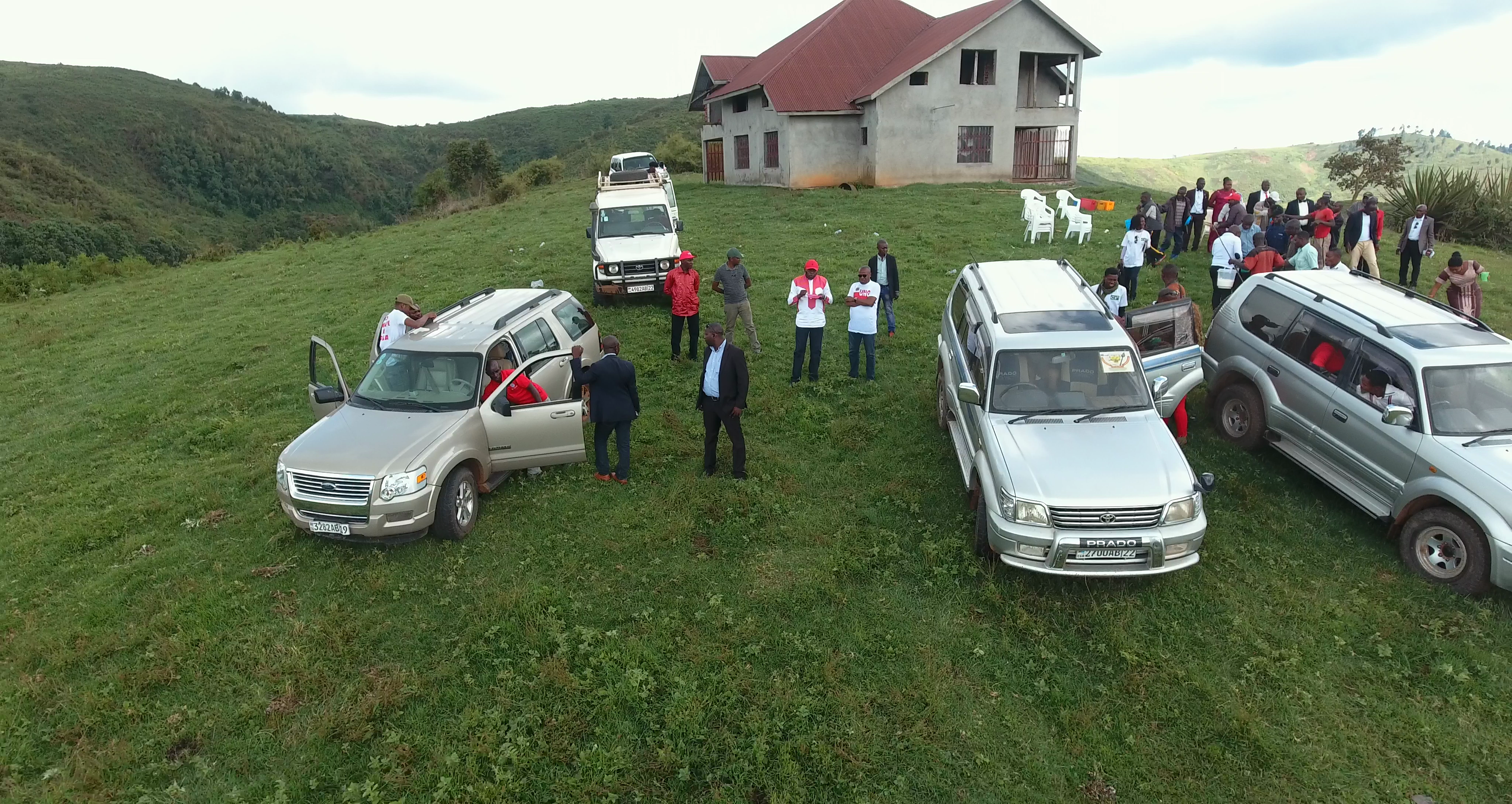
View of Vital Kamerhe's agricultural farm in Mulume Munene, Kabare Territory

Livestock rearing is prevalent in the high plateaus of Kalehe, Kabare, and Walungu Territories, where farmers raise cattle, goats, pigs, rabbits, and poultry through both individual and collective practices. The province features three central livestock systems: individual extensive farming, characterized by small household herds; collective extensive farming, involving pooled herds and shared infrastructure; and intensive small-scale rearing within household compounds. An example of such initiatives includes the Mulume Munene farm, which supports communal livestock management.

Most animals are managed under traditional, low-input conditions where they graze freely on communal pastures and feed on crop residues. Although these practices remain affordable for rural populations, they yield limited productivity due to inadequate nutrition, poor pasture maintenance, and soil nutrient depletion. Seasonal variations, especially during dry periods, worsen feed scarcity, particularly for ruminants. Studies have shown that the shortage of quality forage remains one of the major challenges hindering livestock productivity in eastern Congo, leading to low meat and milk output and higher prices for animal products. Nevertheless, livestock remains a strategic sector for economic revitalization in South Kivu, as it supports income diversification, dietary improvement, and food security in a national context characterized by very low consumption levels of animal products, averaging about 5.2 kilograms of beef, 0.6 kilograms of milk, and 0.1 kilograms of eggs per capita annually.

Fishing in Lake Kivu, Lake Tanganyika, and the surrounding rivers provides food and income for local communities.

=== Mining and natural resources ===
South Kivu's mineral wealth includes gold, cassiterite, coltan (colombo-tantalite), wolframite, tin, monazite, iron ore, diamonds, amethyst, limestone, and methane gas. However, most of the extraction is carried out through artisanal methods, often informally or illegally. Formal industrial mining and production are limited, with only a few formal companies such as SAKIMA (Société Aurifère du Kivu et du Maniema) and CIMENKI (Cimenterie du Kivu) involved. The sector remains plagued by fraud, smuggling, and competition among foreign operators, while a persistent jurisdictional dispute between the national and provincial authorities undermines effective resource governance and equitable revenue distribution.

Industrial activity is underdeveloped. The province once hosted numerous manufacturing enterprises, including oil mills, sugar refineries, soap factories, beverage plants, and match factories, but most have ceased operations due to armed conflict, looting, infrastructure decay, insecurity, and declining global commodity prices. The few surviving industries are mainly limited to the processing of agricultural products, particularly coffee, tea, cinchona, and sugar. However, microfinance remains a notable strength, with 22 banks actively offering credit that empowers local businesses and individuals to grow their incomes.

=== Tourism ===
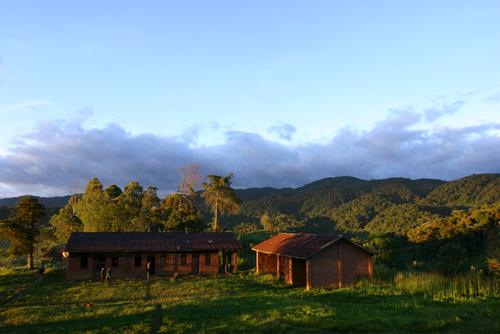
A view of Miki, the capital of Itombwe Sector in Mwenga Territory, located on the Itombwe Mountains plateau

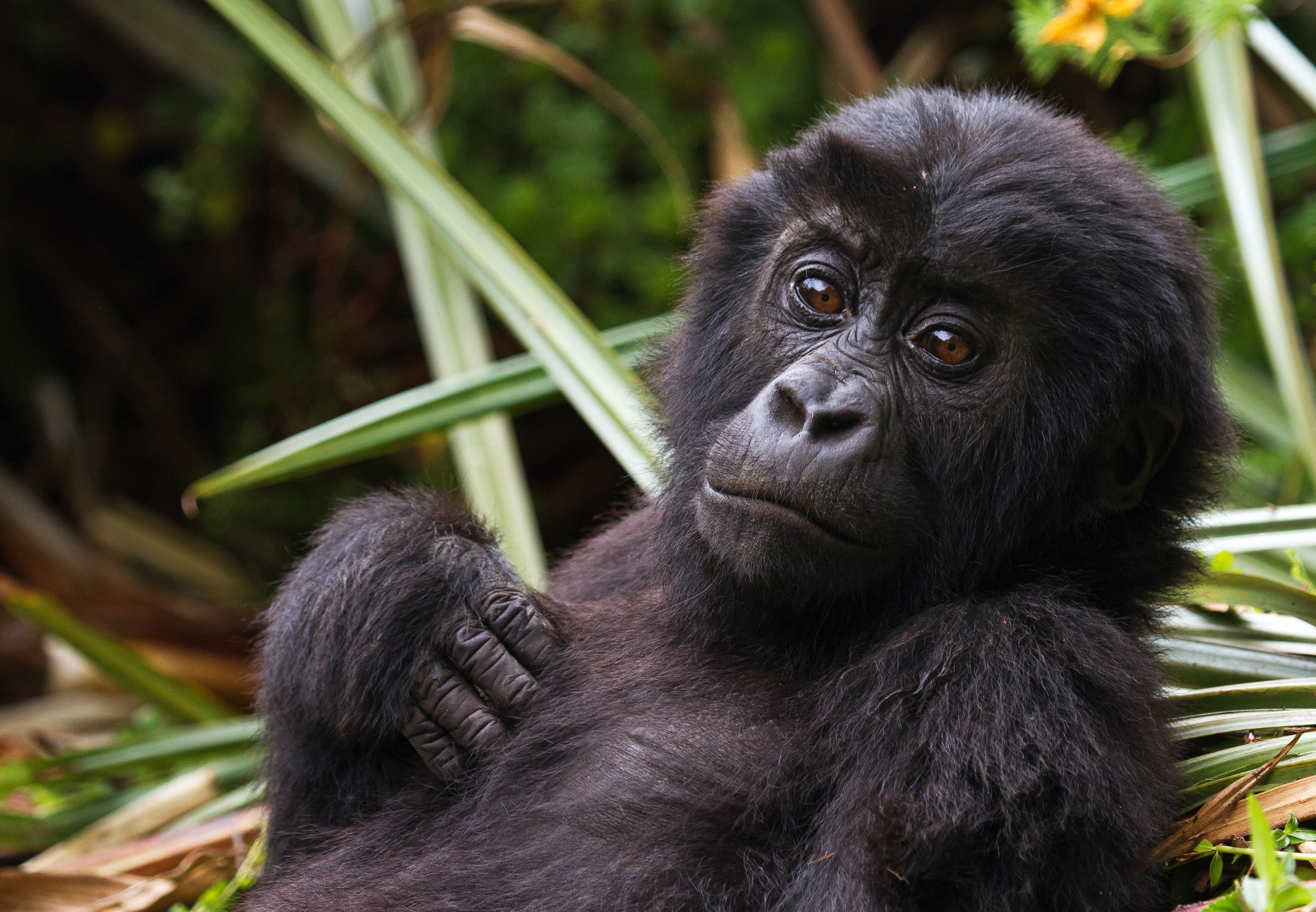
Eastern lowland gorilla infant in Kahuzi-Biéga National Park

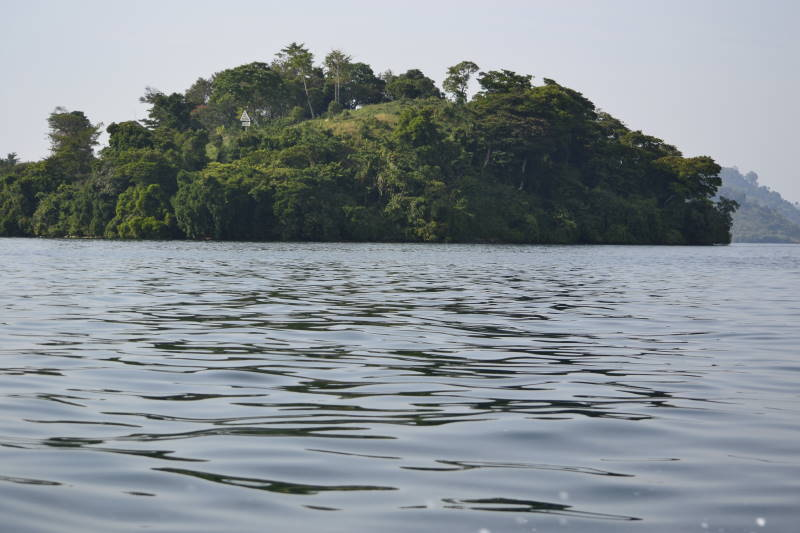
Idjwi Island

The province boasts remarkable ecotourism potential, as it is home to Kahuzi-Biéga National Park, a UNESCO World Heritage Site, which spans across the territories of Kabare, Walungu, Kalehe, and Shabunda. The province also includes 13 protected areas featuring diverse mountain topography, endemic flora, and fauna, including the eastern lowland gorilla (also known as Grauer's gorilla). These natural assets, along with scenic sites such as Lake Kivu, Idjwi Island, and Itombwe Nature Reserve, make South Kivu one of the most ecologically and economically significant regions in eastern DRC.

It also features key institutions dedicated to research and environmental preservation, notably the Social Sciences Research Center (Centre de Recherche en Sciences Sociales; CRSN), the Kanyegero ecovillage near Birava, the Lwiro Primate Rehabilitation Center (Centre de Réhabilitation des Primates de Lwiro; CRPL), the Centre de Recherche en Hydrobiologie, and INERA-Mulungu research center, along with geothermal springs distributed across Kabare, Walungu, Mwenga, Fizi, Shabunda, and Uvira Territories.

== Politics ==
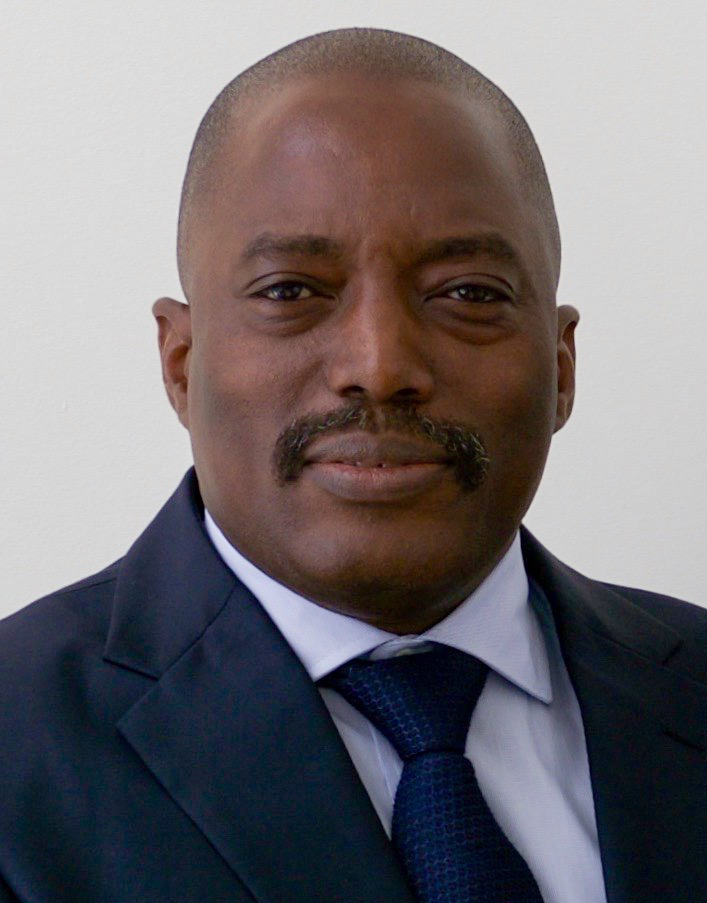
Joseph Kabila is the first South Kivutian to become President.

During Joseph Kabila's presidency (2001–2019), the province was dominated mainly by political figures affiliated with the People's Party for Reconstruction and Democracy (Parti du Peuple pour la Reconstruction et la Démocratie; PPRD) and its allied coalitions like the Alliance of the Presidential Majority (Alliance de la Majorité Présidentielle; AMP) and later the Common Front for Congo (Front Commun pour le Congo; FCC). Political patronage networks linked to Kinshasa enabled members of these coalitions to influence national and provincial governance, with prominent South Kivu elites of the period including Jean-Marie Bulambo Kilosho, Benjamin Mukulungu Igobo, Norbert Basengezi Katintima, Zacharie Lwamira, Néhemie Mwilanya Wilondja (former chief of staff to the president), Marcellin Chishambo (former provincial governor), Justin Bitakwira, and Claude Nyamugabo Bazibuhe. These figures held influential positions across political, administrative, and economic institutions, serving as intermediaries between the central government and provincial constituencies. Meanwhile, opposition figures, including Jean-Claude Kibala N'Kold and François Rubota Masumbuko of the Social Movement for Renewal (Mouvement Social pour le Renouveau; MSR), as well as leaders of the Union for Democracy and Social Progress (UDPS), were marginalized primarily from provincial and national decision-making processes during this era.

In 2019, a consensus reached among nine political leaders resulted in the formation of the FCC–CACH ticket, designating Théo Ngwabidje Kasi as Governor and Marc Malago as Vice-Governor of South Kivu. Following the transfer of power from Kabila to Félix Tshisekedi, the province gained greater prominence at the national level: the position of Chief of Staff, once occupied by Néhémie Mwilanya Wilondja under Kabila, was succeeded by Vital Kamerhe under Tshisekedi. Azarias Ruberwa continued to maintain his political influence with both presidents. The nine political figures who in 2019 led to the formation of the FCC-CACH ticket:

No.	Leaders	Ethnic affiliation	Territories	Political affiliation
1	Modeste Bahati Lukwebo	Shi	Kabare	Alliance des Forces democratiques du Congo (AFDC)
2	Vital Kamerhe	Shi	Walungu	Union for the Congolese Nation (UNC)
3	Azarias Ruberwa	Munyarwanda (Munyamulenge)	Fizi/Mwenga	Rally for Congolese Democracy (RCD)
4	Jean-Marie Bulambo	Lega	Mwenga	Parti National pour la Démocratie et la République (PANADER)
5	Martin Bitijula Mahimba	Fuliru	Uvira	Parti démocrate chrétien (PCD)
6	Marcelin Cishambo	Shi	Walungu	People's Party for Reconstruction and Democracy (PPRD)
7	Kyamusoke Bamusulanga Nta-Bote	Lega	Shabunda	PPRD
8	Néhémie Mwilanya Wilondja	Bembe	Fizi	PCD
9	Boniface Balamage Nkolo	Havu	Idjwi	Action Alternative pour le Bien-être et Changement (AAB)

The collapse of the FCC–CACH coalition in December 2020 brought about a realignment of political alliances nationwide. Through public declarations, several deputies initially elected under FCC-affiliated parties announced their allegiance to the new ruling coalition, the Sacred Union of the Nation (Union sacrée de la Nation). This shift in the parliamentary majority was solidified by the removal of Alexis Thambwe Mwamba's leadership in the Senate, Jeannine Mabunda's dismissal from the National Assembly, and the resignation of Prime Minister Sylvestre Ilunga Ilukamba's government. Members of the UDPS in South Kivu, along with other leaders who aligned themselves with the Sacred Union, obtained ministerial positions and important administrative roles. Meanwhile, figures who maintained allegiance to the FCC and the Kabila faction faced a steep erosion of political clout, as their control over national and provincial bodies weakened considerably. In Kinshasa, Modeste Bahati Lukwebo reclaimed the Senate presidency after failing to secure it in 2019, while South Kivu native Vital Banywesize Mukulya Muhini of the AFDC-A took the post of Second Vice-president of the National Assembly. The prominence of Denise Nyakeru as First Lady also drew attention. These changes collectively bolstered South Kivu's elite representation in the central government. By May 2022, the Sama Lukonde cabinet included seven ministers from South Kivu out of a nationwide total of 58.

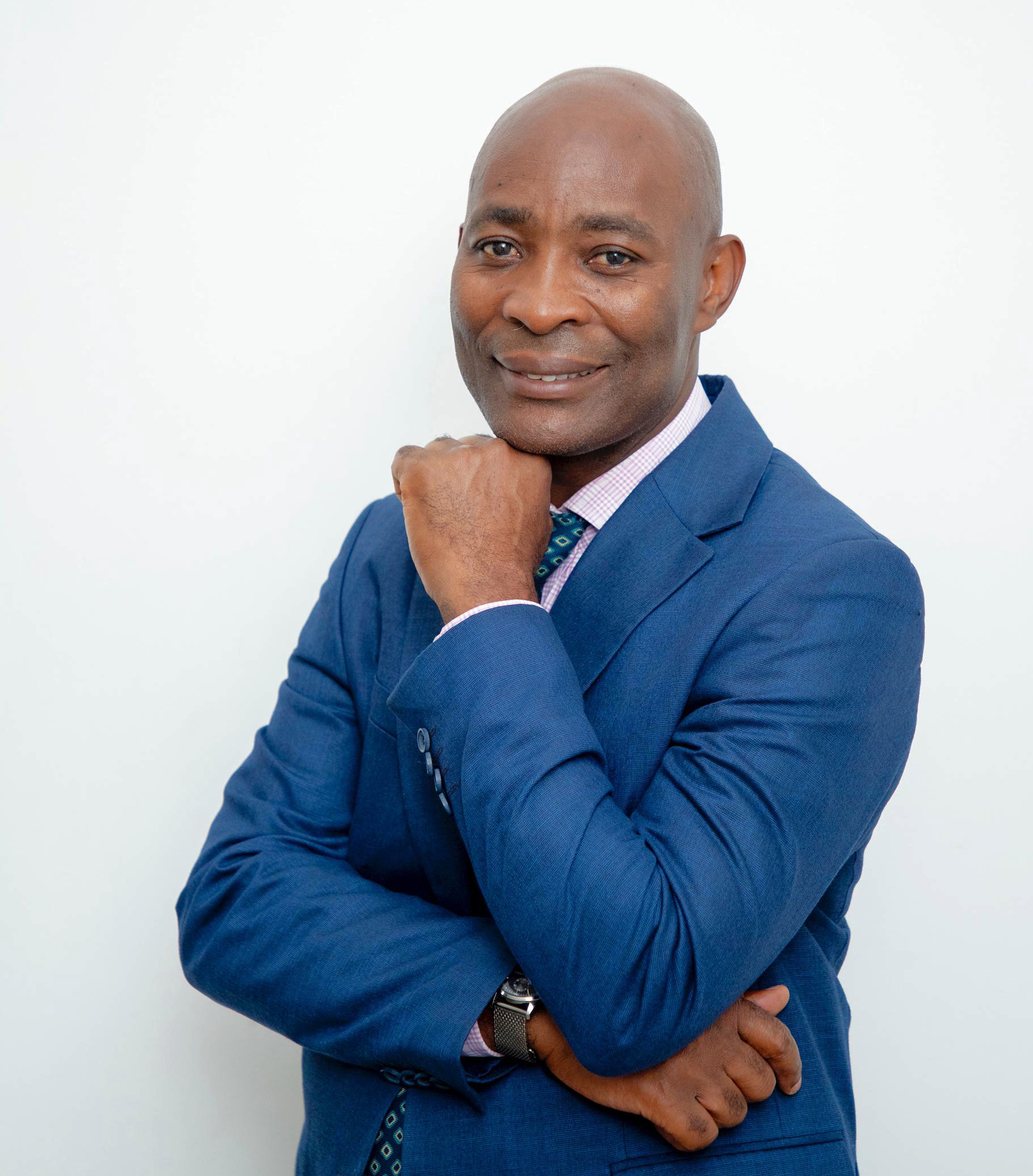
Jean-Jacques Purusi Sadiki has been the current governor of South Kivu since 2 May 2024.

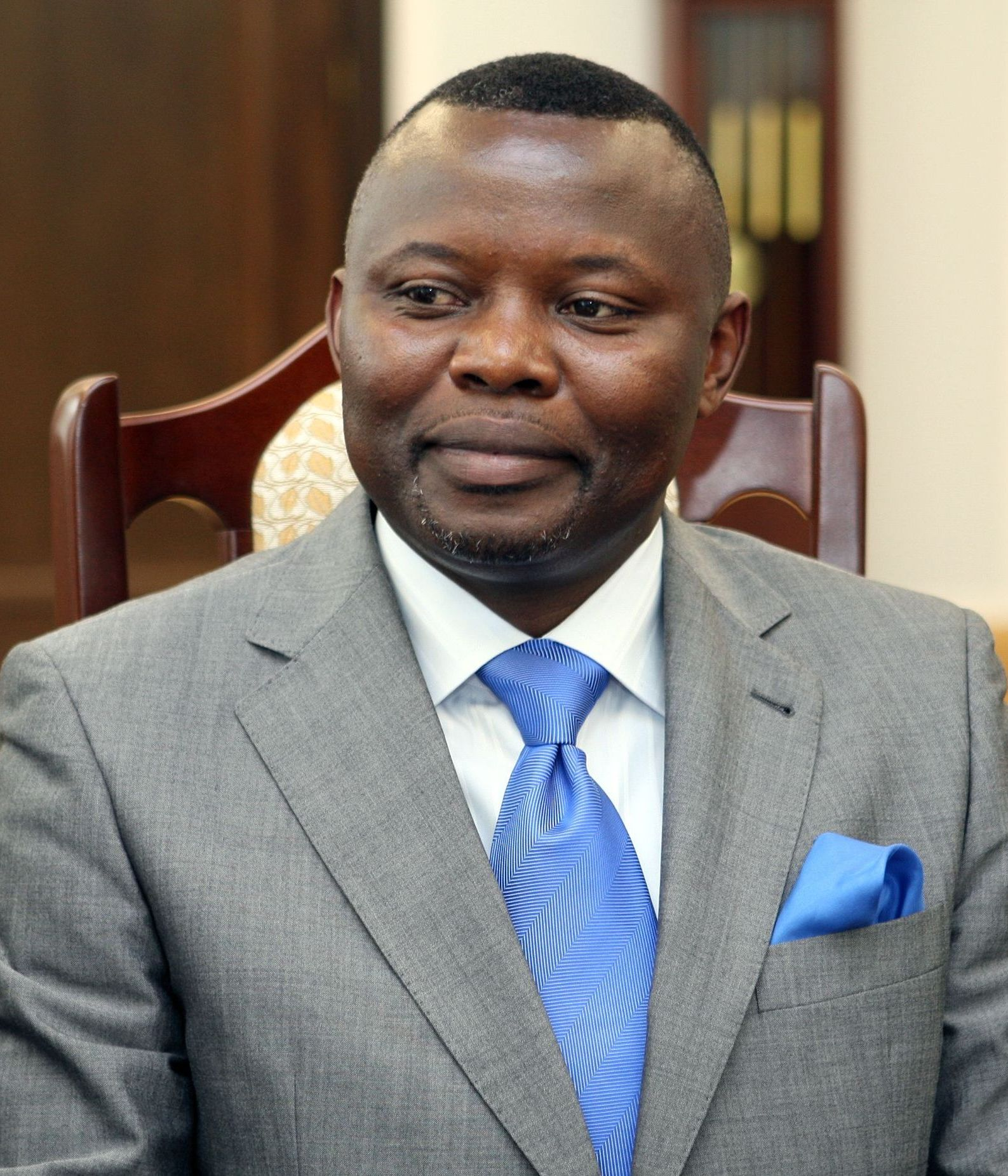
Vital Kamerhe served as President of the National Assembly from 2006–2009 under President Joseph Kabila, and again from 2024–2025 under Félix Tshisekedi.

Political access continues to be defined by the intersection of ethnic and regional affiliations, which underpin legitimacy and representation. At the national level, elite co-optation relies on leaders' ability to mobilize support from their ethnic constituencies within South Kivu, which provides electoral leverage for the central government. However, at the provincial level, ethnic divisions tend to overshadow purely geographic distinctions, as ethnic groups are closely tied to specific territories. This dynamic means that political representation rests on ethno-territorial identity, and once leaders operate from Bukavu or Kinshasa, ethnic belonging becomes the primary driver of their political positioning, with regional origin becoming largely secondary. Prominent business and political actors often straddle economic and political spheres, leveraging their influence through the Federation of Congolese Enterprises (Fédération des Entreprises du Congo; FEC) and other networks. Notable figures include Jean-Pierre Mukubaganyi Mulume, former president of FEC South Kivu and elected national deputy in 2011 on the PPRD list; Olive Mudekereza Namegabe; and Didier Okito Lutundula, elected in 2018 under the Alliance of Democratic Forces of Congo (Alliance des Forces Démocratiques du Congo; AFDC) of Modeste Bahati Lukwebo. Power distribution thus remains deeply partisan and centralized, with Kinshasa exerting control over provincial affairs through the co-optation of political elites based in both the national capital and Bukavu.

Since the 2006 democratic elections, the formation of provincial institutions has been subject to ongoing political negotiations among parties, coalitions, and individual leaders. These power-sharing arrangements often consider the province's ethnic and regional diversity, informally divided into three main political spheres: the Shi Sphere, covering Kabare, Walungu, Kalehe, Mwenga (specifically the chiefdoms of Luhwinja and Burhinyi), and Idjwi; the Lega Sphere, including Mwenga and Shabunda; and the Vira-Bembe Sphere, encompassing Uvira and Fizi. The composition of the provincial government and leadership within the provincial assembly generally echoes these ethno-regional dynamics to maintain a balance of representation. Roles within these institutions are split between administrative and political functions. Administrative posts belong to the permanent civil service, intended for long-term career professionals, while political positions, such as ministerial roles, cabinet advisers, and strategic appointments, are short-term and negotiated through coalition deals following elections. Access to such positions depends on participation in political negotiations and endorsement by the dominant actors, many of whom maintain dual influence in Kinshasa and Bukavu. South Kivu's political system remains highly personalized and fragmented, operating within a structure where ethnic affiliation, patronage, and party loyalty continue to dictate access to governance and the exercise of authority.

== Transport ==
The province has 1,041 km of national roads, of which 222 kilometers, or approximately 17 percent, are paved. There are also 813 kilometers of provincial roads and 2,301 kilometers of agricultural service routes. National Road No. 2 (RN2) serves as the primary route for accessing the mountainous region of South Kivu. It links Bukavu with Goma and serves as a vital passage for the year-round evacuation of agricultural products. Despite crossing the highlands of South Kivu, RN2 intersects territories with distinct geographical and infrastructural characteristics, and within Kabare Territory, three national roads, such as RN2, RN3, and RN5, converge.

The province's air transport system is centered on Kavumu Airport, situated in Kavumu, Kabare Territory, as well as several airstrips. Kavumu Airport's main destinations include Kinshasa, Goma, Lubumbashi, Namoya, Kindu, Kalemie, Minembwe, Kongolo, Shabunda, Lulimba, Lulinga, Kasese, Kalima, as well as Uganda and Rwanda. The province's main navigable waterways are Lakes Kivu and Tanganyika. Lake Kivu is the main navigable waterway located near RN2. Other means of transport, besides boats and trucks for goods and cars for passengers, include motorcycles and bicycles for travelers with light luggage and for the transportation of small merchandise.
