= Bibokoboko =

- Village
- Village de Bibokoboko
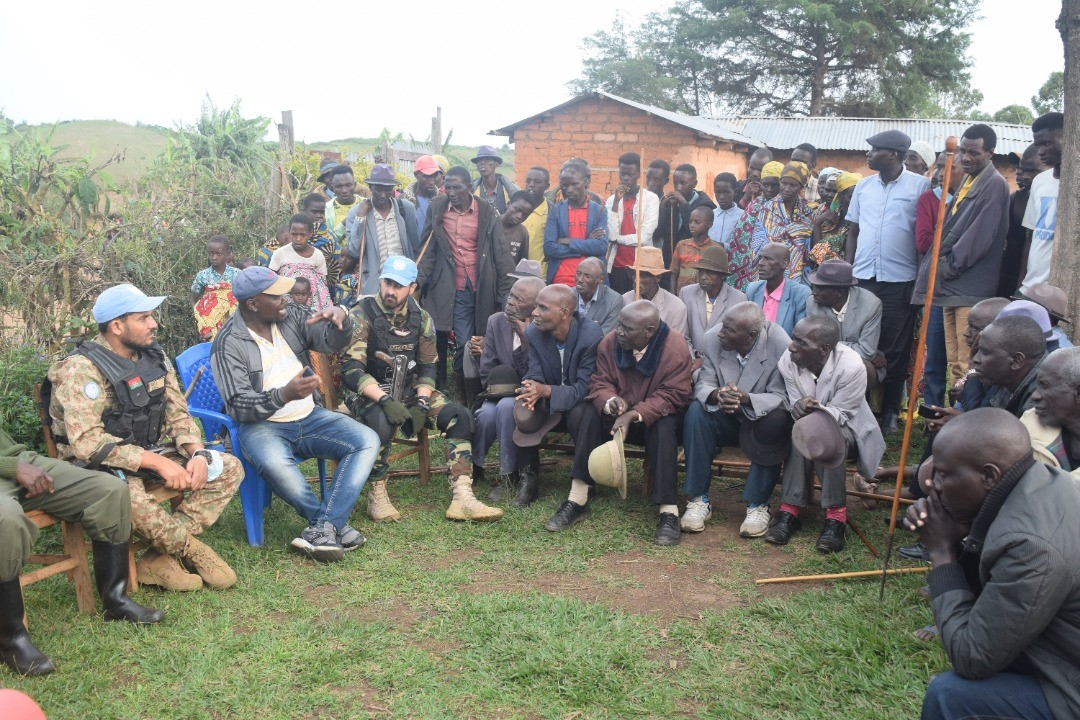
- Pakistani peacekeepers from MONUSCO, in coordination with the Congolese army, engaging with the local population of Bibokoboko to promote community reassurance and demonstrate their commitment to civilian protection.
- Country: Democratic Republic of the Congo
- Province: South Kivu
- Territory: Fizi
- Sector: Mutambala

Government
  - Chef de village: David Matare

Bibokoboko is a village located in the middle plateaus of the Mutambala Sector, within Fizi Territory in South Kivu Province, in the eastern part of the Democratic Republic of the Congo. Positioned approximately 23 kilometers northwest of the city of Baraka, Bibokoboko lies along the Baraka–Mongemonge–Tujenge–Bibokoboko road axis, a route that is infrequently used due to poor infrastructure. Baraka serves as the primary supply center for essential goods and services for the Bibokoboko population.

The village shares boundaries with Uvira Territory to the north, Mwenga and Shabunda Territories to the west, Kalemie Territory to the south, and Lake Tanganyika to the east. Bibokoboko benefits from the mineral wealth of the Mutambala region, including deposits of gold, iron, coltan, tantalum, tin, tungsten, and petroleum. The village also plays a humanitarian role, having hosted refugees from Tanzania at the Mshimbakye border post and accommodating various international humanitarian organizations. Despite its natural and strategic assets, the area is affected by ongoing violence involving local armed groups.

== History ==
The area surrounding Bibokoboko has historically been inhabited by the Babembe, Basanze, Babuyu, Balega, Bazoba, Babwari, Bantu ethnic groups native to the shores of Lake Tanganyika and the broader Fizi Territory. Closely related groups such as the Nyindu, Bagoma, and Fuliiru also reside in the region. During the colonial period in the mid-20th century, the village began receiving Banyarwanda migrants from Rwanda, who settled in the area in search of greener pastures. Bibokoboko later became a refuge for Burundian Hutu immigrants fleeing political violence, notably during the 1972 massacres known as the Ikiza and the subsequent displacements of 1976–1977.

=== First Congo War ===
In the 1990s, Bibokoboko and the wider Fizi region were deeply affected by the First Congo War (1996–1997), a conflict that was ignited in the aftermath of the 1994 Rwandan genocide. Following the genocide, the Rwandan Patriotic Front (RPF), under Paul Kagame, overthrew the Hutu-dominated regime of Juvénal Habyarimana. However, RPF military operations extended beyond neutralizing Hutu militias and included the widespread killing of Hutu civilians, as documented by UNHCR consultant Robert Gersony. As many as 5,000 to 10,000 people were reported killed monthly in mid-1994 during these operations. The mass exodus of over two million Rwandan Hutus into eastern Zaire, including the provinces of North and South Kivu, exacerbated regional tensions. The already fragile Zairean state under Mobutu Sese Seko struggled to assert control. By 1996, the Rwandan Patriotic Army (RPA), Ugandan forces, and the Burundian Forces Armées Burundaises (FAB) began supporting Banyamulenge and other Tutsi militias operating in eastern Zaire. On 12 September 1996, Banyamulenge armed elements killed nine civilians, including local leaders and their families, in Kanyura and Makutano in the Itombwe Sector of the Mwenga Territory. Among the victims were a head of management post (chef de poste d'encadrement) of the Rega ethnic group, the chief of the Basymuniaka II groupement, a Bembe from Fizi Territory, and two members of his family. These killings were seen by many locals as the onset of a broader campaign of violence against their communities.

As the Alliance des Forces Démocratiques pour la Libération du Congo (AFDL), alongside RPA and FAB troops, pushed deeper into South Kivu, several massacres occurred. In late October 1996, AFDL and RPA forces killed 27 civilians, predominantly women and children, in the village of Mboko, approximately 52 kilometers south of Uvira in Fizi Territory. The victims, attempting to flee across Lake Tanganyika to Tanzania, were either shot or drowned. On 28 October 1996, another massacre occurred in the village of Abala-Ngulube, situated at the junction of the Moyen Plateau and Haut Plateau near Minembwe. A total of 101 civilians belonging to the Bembe ethnic group and members of the Third Malikia wa Ubembe Church were killed by AFDL and RPA forces. Many victims were burned alive inside the church after refusing to evacuate the village. The attack followed an ambush in which Bembe fighters had reportedly killed two AFDL and RPA soldiers in the surrounding area. Since the massacre, members of the Third Malikia wa Ubembe Church have commemorated the victims annually on 28 October. Beginning in October 1996, AFDL and RPA forces initiated the recruitment of child soldiers in the territories of Uvira and Fizi, as well as in the city of Bukavu. In Bukavu, recruitment was conducted from the AFDL headquarters located in the Lolango Building on Avenue Maniema. Recruited children received basic military training in the village of Kidoti before being deployed to the front lines.

The violence and upheaval culminated in the capture of Kinshasa by May 1997, leading to the overthrow of Mobutu. Laurent-Désiré Kabila assumed control of the country, which was subsequently renamed the Democratic Republic of the Congo.

=== Second Congo War ===
The Second Congo War, which began in 1998, significantly destabilized the region. The conflict originated from escalating tensions between President Laurent-Désiré Kabila and his former Rwandan and Ugandan allies. Kabila, who had seized power from Mobutu Sese Seko in 1997, was accused of marginalizing Tutsi factions within his government and favoring his Katangan allies. During this period, allegations emerged suggesting that the United States had provided military assistance to Rwanda, ostensibly to facilitate access to the DRC's extensive natural resources. In July 1998, a U.S. Army Rwanda Interagency Assessment Team (RIAT) was deployed to train Rwandan military units. Reports from war correspondent Keith Harmon Snow further implicated U.S. figures, such as Roger Winter of the U.S. Committee for Refugees and Immigrants, in supporting insurgent activities.

Tensions escalated in July 1998 when Kabila, concerned about a potential coup d'état, dismissed Rwandan General James Kabarebe from his position as Chief of Staff of the Congolese army and ordered all RPA soldiers to withdraw from Congolese territory. This move provoked strong reactions from Rwanda and Uganda, which subsequently supported the formation of a new rebel coalition known as the Rassemblement Congolais pour la Démocratie (RCD). On 2 August 1998, mutinous Congolese soldiers, allied with the RPA, the Ugandan People's Defence Force (UPDF), the Forces Armées Burundaises (FAB), and remnants of the former Armed Forces of Zaire (Forces Armées Zaïroises, FAZ), announced their rebellion via the state broadcaster Radio Télévision nationale congolaise (RTNC) in Goma. Within weeks, this coalition, under the banner of the RCD, captured major towns across North and South Kivu, Orientale Province, and North Katanga, and advanced into Équateur Province. However, their offensive in Bas-Congo Province (now Kongo Central) and the capital, Kinshasa, was repelled by military interventions from Angola and Zimbabwe in support of Kabila. Consequently, the country was effectively divided into two zones: one controlled by Kabila's government, supported by Zimbabwean, Angolan, Namibian, Chadian, and Sudanese forces, and the other controlled by the armed wing of the RCD, the Armée Nationale Congolaise (ANC), alongside Rwandan and Ugandan forces, including the RPA, UPDF, and FAB. The conflict rapidly grew more complex, as Kabila formed alliances with Mayi-Mayi militias, Burundian Hutu rebels such as the Forces pour la Défense de la Démocratie (FDD), and ex-FAR/Interahamwe forces reorganized under the Armée de Libération du Rwanda (ALiR). These groups aimed to counter the influence of the ANC and RPA in the eastern regions of the country. Meanwhile, Uganda, which controlled substantial parts of Orientale Province, established and backed the Mouvement pour la Libération du Congo (MLC), led by Jean-Pierre Bemba, to govern territories captured in Équateur Province. By March 1999, strategic disagreements between Rwanda and Uganda led to a split within the RCD, resulting in the formation of two factions: the pro-Rwandan RCD-Goma and the pro-Ugandan RCD-Mouvement de Libération (RCD-ML).

Although RCD-Goma's military wing, the ANC, along with RPA and FAB forces, quickly occupied urban centers in South Kivu, they encountered difficulties consolidating control over rural areas. The RCD's alliances with Banyamulenge communities, coupled with reliance on Rwandan support and widespread violence committed by its forces, led to alienation among local populations. Many civilians joined Mayi-Mayi militias or formed new groups, such as Mudundu 40 in Walungu Territory. Some of these militias allied with reorganized Hutu factions, including ex-FAR/Interahamwe and the ALiR, as well as the Burundian Hutu CNDD-FDD. Certain Mayi-Mayi factions, like General Padiri's division in Bunyakiri and Colonel Dunia's Forces d'Autodéfense Populaires (FAP) in Shabunda Territory, received arms and logistical support from Kinshasa to coordinate their operations, although most militias operated independently. In response to attacks by Mayi-Mayi forces, the ANC, RPA, and FAB troops intensified search operations, which included widespread sexual violence and systematic targeting of civilians.

In October and November 1998, soldiers from the ANC and FAB killed 22 civilians in the villages of Swima and Lusambo, located in Tanganyika Sector of Fizi Territory. The killings occurred during a market day, with the soldiers opening fire indiscriminately after alleging that the local population supported Mayi-Mayi and CNDD-FDD fighters. The violence escalated following an incident in which an FDD combatant wounded a member of the ANC-FAB forces. On 21 December 1998, another massacre occurred in the village of Mboko, in Tanganyika Sector, where ANC, RPA, and FAB soldiers killed nine civilians. After driving out Mayi-Mayi forces, the soldiers conducted house-to-house searches and executed civilians, some by shooting, others by edged weapons. Between 30 December 1998 and 2 January 1999, one of the most brutal episodes, known as the Makobola massacre, took place across several villages in Fizi Territory, including Makobola II, Bangwe, Katuta, Mikunga, and Kashekezi. Over 800 civilians were killed by ANC, RPA, and FAB forces. These attacks followed the deaths of RPA and ANC commanders in Makobola on 29 December 1998. Although Mayi-Mayi forces had already retreated to the surrounding mountains, the soldiers retaliated against the civilian population, many of whom were women, children, Red Cross workers, and religious leaders. The massacres included the burning alive of civilians in their homes, widespread looting, and the destruction of property.

Further atrocities were reported in March 1999, when six fishermen were burned alive by FAB soldiers in the village of Kazimia in Ngandja Sector of Fizi Territory. The incident occurred shortly after clashes between the ANC-FAB forces and Mayi-Mayi/CNDD-FDD militias over control of the village. In May 1999, following the recapture of Baraka from Mayi-Mayi forces, ANC soldiers burned 28 civilians alive in the nearby village of Mwandiga. The victims, which included entire families with children, had been attempting to flee to Ubwari and had stopped in the village in search of transport. After gathering for what was announced as a meeting, they were instead executed and set alight. On 30 June 2000, another attack occurred in Lulinda and nearby areas such as Mwachata and Icwa in the Tanganyika Sector. At least 29 civilians were killed by ANC and RPA soldiers, who also committed acts of rape and arson.

==== Joseph Kabila's rise to power and the shift in the conflict ====
Following the assassination of President Laurent-Désiré Kabila on 16 January 2001, his son Joseph Kabila assumed the presidency. His rise to power marked a turning point in the Second Congo War, as he sought to de-escalate the conflict and re-engage in peace processes. Joseph Kabila's leadership opened the door for renewed diplomatic efforts, including preparations for the Inter-Congolese Dialogue (ICD), a national reconciliation initiative intended to bring together the government, rebel factions, opposition parties, and civil society. In March 2001, United Nations Mission in the Democratic Republic of Congo (MONUC) were deployed along key frontlines to monitor compliance with the ceasefire agreements. Despite these efforts, violence continued in the eastern provinces, particularly in North and South Kivu. Armed confrontations persisted between Mayi-Mayi militias, the FDD, the ALiR, and the RCD-Goma's military wing, ANC, backed by the RPA.

In an effort to consolidate its political and military influence in South Kivu and marginalize the Democratic Forces for the Liberation of Rwanda (FDLR), RCD-Goma initiated the inter-Kivu dialogue in September 2001. The initiative sought separate peace agreements with local Mayi-Mayi factions, but was largely unsuccessful. Most Mayi-Mayi groups, supported by the Kinshasa government, refused to participate, with the exception of the Mudundu 40 faction. The process was also boycotted by many civil society organizations, weakening its legitimacy. Violence remained widespread into 2002. In one incident, between 17 and 20 civilians, including a baby and two minors, were killed in the village of Kaboke II in Tanganyika Sector. Victims were either shot, burned alive, or killed while attempting to hide from advancing ANC and RPA troops. Simultaneously, a rebellion emerged within the Banyamulenge community in Minembwe, led by Patrick Masunzu, a former ANC commander. His newly formed Forces Républicaines et Fédéralistes (FRF) allied with Mayi-Mayi groups in the Mwenga, Uvira, and Fizi territories, launching attacks against ANC and RPA forces with covert support from the Congolese government.

Despite ongoing hostilities, the Inter-Congolese Dialogue officially commenced on 25 February 2002 in Sun City, South Africa. On 19 April, President Joseph Kabila and Jean-Pierre Bemba announced a preliminary power-sharing framework. Although this accord was widely welcomed, it was rejected by RCD-Goma and several opposition parties, including the Union for Democracy and Social Progress (UDPS). Nevertheless, a key breakthrough occurred on 30 July 2002, when the governments of the DRC and Rwanda signed a peace agreement in Pretoria. This accord stipulated the withdrawal of Rwandan forces in return for the dismantling of Hutu armed groups, including the ex-FAR/Interahamwe within the FDLR. A parallel agreement with Uganda was signed in Luanda on 6 September 2002, paving the way for Ugandan troop withdrawals and efforts to stabilize the Ituri region. By late 2002, foreign troop withdrawals had begun. Soldiers from Zimbabwe, Angola, Namibia, Rwanda, and Uganda started to exit Congolese territory. However, the departure of the RDF created a power vacuum in South Kivu, allowing Mayi-Mayi militias and the FDLR to reclaim lost territory. In response, ANC and RDF units launched military operations to recapture strategic positions.

On 17 December 2002, under growing international pressure, the various Congolese parties signed the Global and All-Inclusive Agreement in Pretoria. This landmark accord provided a framework for power-sharing and the integration of armed factions into a unified national army. Toward the end of 2002, RCD-Goma attempted to forge new alliances by negotiating with the political wing of Mudundu 40, led by Odilon Kurhenga Muzimu and Patient Mwendanga. In exchange for RDF withdrawal from Walungu Territory, RCD-Goma offered political positions, appointing Mwendanga as Governor of South Kivu. However, the military wing of Mudundu 40, under Albert Kahasha (alias Foka Mike) and aligned with Padiri's Mayi-Mayi, refused to demobilize and instead entrenched its positions in the Burhale area. By March 2003, as negotiations failed to neutralize the armed wing of Mudundu 40, Mwendanga was dismissed, and ANC, with RDF reinforcements, launched an offensive in Walungu Territory. Meanwhile, other regions such as North Katanga and Ituri continued to experience violent militia conflicts. Despite these setbacks, the participants in the Inter-Congolese Dialogue ratified the Global and All-Inclusive Agreement on 1 April 2003 in Sun City. An accompanying memorandum detailed the integration of various armed groups into the national army and the establishment of transitional governance structures. On 30 June 2003, the transitional institutions were formally inaugurated, marking the official end of the Second Congo War and the beginning of the transitional period in the DRC.

==== Sexual violence and pillaging ====
Between 1998 and 2003, Fizi Territory experienced widespread sexual violence and systematic pillaging. During this period, at least 1,660 cases of rape were documented across three main areas of the region, though these figures are widely believed to represent only a fraction of the actual number due to underreporting, stigma, and limited access to affected areas. The perpetrators included all major armed actors operating in the region. Among the recorded cases, 89 involved male victims, a form of sexual violence that was notably perpetrated primarily by the FDD. These cases highlight the often-overlooked dimension of sexual violence against men during the conflict, which has received comparatively limited attention in documentation and intervention efforts.

Between 1998 and 2003, the FDD was responsible for the deaths of at least four individuals, numerous rapes, and repeated acts of looting in the village. Kalundja village in Fizi Territory became notorious for the regularity of these abuses, earning the grim nickname "Dubai" among local residents, a reference to the frequency and scale of pillaging, ironically alluding to the wealth and luxury associated with the Emirati city, in stark contrast to the village's suffering and impoverishment.

== Ongoing insecurity problems ==
Since the end of the Second Congo War, Bibokoboko faced persistent insecurity, largely driven by inter-communal violence and the proliferation of local armed groups. The region has witnessed sustained clashes between the Twirwaneho-Makanika militia, composed predominantly of Banyamulenge combatants, and various Mai-Mai groups, especially the Mai-Mai Mutetezi, largely made up of Babembe fighters. In February 2010, at least five armed incidents were documented along the strategic route linking Baraka to Bibokoboko, involving both Banyamulenge and Mai-Mai militias. The security situation deteriorated further over the following decade. By 2019, Banyamulenge militias under the newly established Twirwaneho rebel group, meaning "let's defend ourselves" in Kinyarwanda, began mobilizing across villages in the Hauts-Plateaux. These efforts were strengthened by the integration of combatants from the Gumino armed group and by young Banyamulenge recruits from the regional diaspora, referred to as "Androids". Twirwaneho also benefited from significant financial support from Banyamulenge networks inside and outside the DRC. A turning point came with the arrival of Colonel Michel Rukunda, alias Makanika, a former officer of the FARDC, who defected and took command of Twirwaneho in early 2020. Under Makanika's leadership, Twirwaneho evolved into a more structured and militarily capable organization. The United Nations Group of Experts identified the existence of a centralized command structure within the group, which was reinforced by the recruitment of new fighters from local, national, and international Banyamulenge communities. Some of these recruitments were reported to be forced. Twirwaneho also drew support from armed civilians residing in nearby villages, who acted as a reserve force and could be mobilized rapidly for operations. In March 2020, Makanika initiated the construction of a clandestine airstrip intended for the importation of arms and logistical supplies to support Twirwaneho's activities. However, this project was halted by FARDC forces in June 2020.

Armed confrontations escalated notably from mid-2020, with Twirwaneho engaging in battles against rival militias, the FARDC, and on occasion, civilian populations. These developments paralleled increased military activity among Mai-Mai factions. In 2020, the United Nations Security Council documented multiple cases of sexual violence perpetrated by Twirwaneho combatants. Seven women from the Babembe and Bafuliiru ethnic groups reported being raped by one to three armed men in locations including Kamambo, Mikalati, Kitasha, and Marunde. The assailants reportedly made ethnic slurs during the attacks, in some instances explicitly warning the victims and their communities to leave the area. Victims reported knowledge of at least 12 similar assaults, and additional reports emerged of abductions, sexual violence, and killings committed by Twirwaneho fighters against internally displaced persons from Mikenge and the Bijombo camp. One survivor described witnessing children over the age of 16 participate in rapes.

Toward the end of 2020, prominent Bembe Mai-Mai leaders such as William Yakutumba and Trésor Ebuela wa Seba (also known as Ebuela Mtetezi) initiated a consolidation of various Mai-Mai groups. This ad hoc coalition included the National Coalition of the People for the Sovereignty of Congo (CNPSC), the Forces des Patriotes pour la Défense du Congo – Mouvement de Libération (FPDC-ML), and the Forces Armées "Biloze Bishambuke" (FABB), among others. Although the coalition lacked a unified command structure, it enhanced coordination among the member groups, enabling joint operations against Twirwaneho and Gumino militias, and the provision of mutual support during combat. The mobility and flexibility of these Mai-Mai factions allowed them to regroup and respond swiftly to emerging threats.

Both Twirwaneho and the Mai-Mai sustained their military activities by acquiring arms and ammunition through a combination of direct attacks on FARDC positions and support from sympathetic communities. Between late 2019 and late 2020, at least 46 FARDC personnel, many from the 12th Rapid Reaction Brigade operating in the Hauts-Plateaux, were arrested for involvement in arms trafficking, according to military judicial sources cited by the United Nations Group of Experts. Several FARDC soldiers and commanders were either arrested or suspected of such involvement, reflecting systemic challenges within the national army's control over its own resources. The protracted conflict has had severe consequences for the civilian population. The influx of FARDC defectors, including high-ranking officers such as Colonel Charles Sematama in February 2021, bolstered Twirwaneho's firepower. Within the Banyamulenge community, Twirwaneho exerted increasing pressure on local leaders to contribute recruits to the militia. Those who resisted were subjected to threats and assassinations. At least three Banyamulenge leaders, including local authorities in Minembwe, were killed from September 2021 onward. In October 2021, the leader of the Banyamulenge internally displaced persons (IDP) camp in Mikenge was abducted. Twirwaneho reportedly targeted individuals perceived as supporters of rival groups such as Gumino, or those unwilling to align with Twirwaneho's objectives.

Hostilities intensified in October 2021 when Mai-Mai Mutetezi and Mai-Mai Biloze Bishambuke launched coordinated assaults on Twirwaneho-Makanika positions in Mugorore, Mugono, Bivumu, and Bibokoboko. These groups claimed to be countering attempts by Twirwaneho and its allies, particularly Gumino, to expand their influence from the middle plateaus to the coastal areas during FARDC deployment. The attacks led to the reported capture of 40 Twirwaneho combatants, the looting of property, including over 100 cattle, and civilian casualties. The Twirwaneho, however, rejected these justifications and framed the assaults as attempts at "ethnic cleansing". This characterization was dismissed by FARDC's South Kivu spokesperson, Captain Dieudonné Kasereka, who emphasized the confrontational nature of the clashes between armed factions, rather than targeted ethnic violence. He also confirmed that villages on both sides had been burned and condemned the escalation, stating that FARDC had mobilized forces to pursue those responsible. By late 2021, Twirwaneho had stepped up its attacks on FARDC positions and succeeded in recapturing certain strongholds. A particularly gruesome incident occurred in December 2021 in Kamombo, where the group beheaded and dismembered Colonel Yaoundé Kyembe Melchior, a commander in the 121st Battalion. These actions allowed Twirwaneho to seize additional weaponry and further strengthen its military capabilities. However, the displaced returned to their environment in late December 2021 after establishing a temporary base for the United Nations Organization Stabilization Mission in the Democratic Republic of the Congo (MONUSCO) in the region.

== See also ==
- Mutambala
