= Beembe =

Beembe or Bembe may be:

- Bembe people
  - Bembe language (Ibembe)
- Beembe tribe (Kongo)
  - Bembe language (Kibembe)
