= Zyoba people =

Languages
- Kizyoba

Religion
- Christianity; Zyoba religion

Related ethnic groups
- Vira; Nyindu; Bembe; Fuliru; Bashi

The Zyoba people, also known as Bazyoba, Bakyoba, or Bazoba, are a Bantu-speaking ethnic group inhabiting the northwestern shores of Lake Tanganyika in the eastern Democratic Republic of the Congo, particularly in Uvira Territory and Fizi Territory in the South Kivu province, with settlements extending into adjacent areas of Burundi and Tanzania. The Zyoba speak the Joba language (also called Kizyoba-Kisanze).

- Person: Muzyoba
- People: Bazyoba
- Language: Kizyoba
- Country: Buzyoba

Historical and ethnographic studies trace Zyoba's origins to the present-day Lwindi Chiefdom and the Itombwe highlands, where oral traditions linked them to ancestral figures such as Kabuka (Abu'a) of the Batumba clan, which is still present among the Fuliiru, Bembe, Vira, and Lega, and which remains the ruling dynasty of the Nyindu. During the 19th and early 20th centuries, increasing external influences, including Arab-Swahili trade networks and later European colonial and missionary expansion, brought changes to settlement organization, economic practices, and political systems, while intensifying cultural exchange.

The Zyoba have traditionally relied on the resources of Lake Tanganyika, with fishing as the primary subsistence activity, alongside agriculture, hunting, livestock farming, and participation in regional trade networks.

== History ==
=== Ethnogenesis and early settlement ===
According to the Belgian anthropologist Daniel P. Biebuyck, the Zyoba trace their ancestry to the present-day Lwindi Chiefdom and the Itombwe highlands, with genealogical traditions linking them to Kabuka (also called Abu'a) of the Batumba clan, which remains extant among the Fuliiru, Bembe, Vira, and Lega, and continues to constitute the ruling dynasty of the Nyindu.

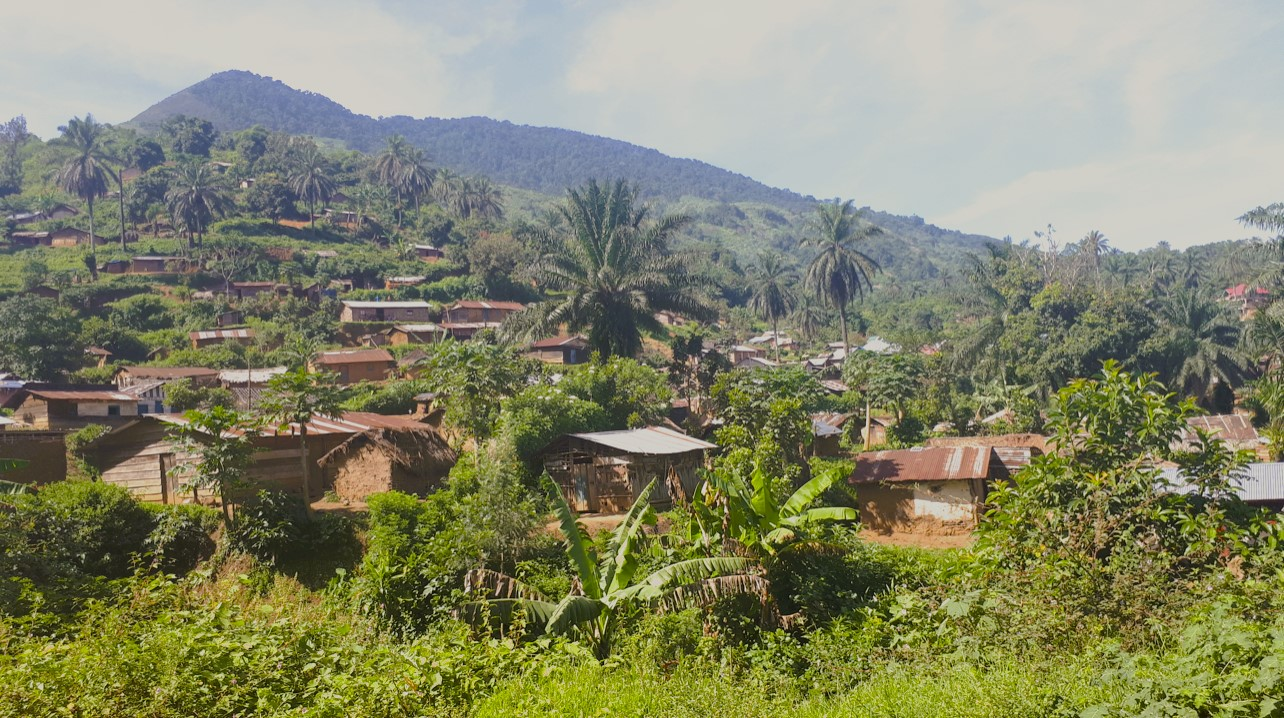
Kasika, Lwindi Chiefdom

Oral traditions describe Kabuka as having four wives, each of whom bore children who became foundational figures or early leaders of various ethnic groups in the South Kivu province. His first wife bore Mukinji (M'minje), who is considered the ancestral figure of people in Uvira Territory, and Mutalwa, a notable chief in Lwindi. His second wife gave birth to Ngweshe, who became chief of the Bashi, and Musinga, the first chief of the Banyarwanda. His third wife gave birth to Namubeza, first chief of the Balega, along with Musambya of Mutambala in Fizi Territory, Basibagera, who did not become a chief, and Kasumba, leader of the hunters (Balumbu or Basi'asumba), who are "identified with the Pygmies (Batwa or Bambote)". His fourth wife bore Kirunga, chief of the Bafuliiru, and Ngabwe, chief of the Balunga (Bazyoba) of the mountains.

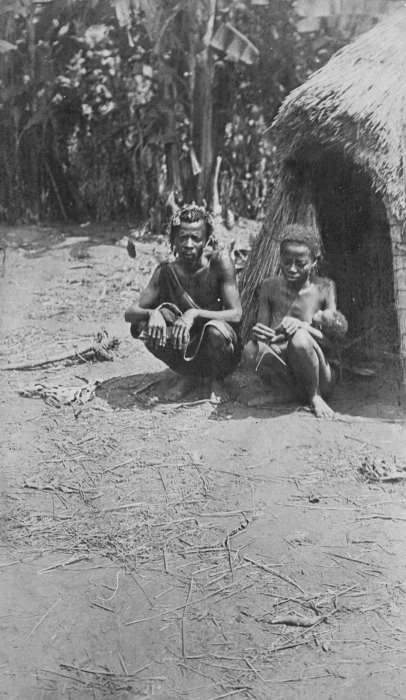
A Bavira family in front of their hut in Uvira, 1913. Photograph by P.F. Hubrecht.

Mukinje is said to be the progenitor of several chiefly lineages among the Bembe and Zyoba, although Biebuyck himself noted that such accounts are simplified and, at times, politically motivated. The institution of chieftaincy among groups such as the Bembe and Lega, beyond specific lineages like the Basim'minje among the Bembe and the Banyindu and Basimwenda among the Lega, is considerably more complex than these traditions imply. Accounts of the early settlement of the Bavira along the shores of Lake Tanganyika vary across sources, particularly in terms of chronology and patterns of migration. Biebuyck posits that the Bavira were among the earliest inhabitants of the lakeshore, having migrated from Lwindi near the Ulindi River in the mountainous interior. Congolese historian Jacques Depelchin emphasizes Vira's initial settlement near Mount Munanira alongside a group of seven notables such as Muhinga, Nawaganda, Mufumu, Nakabaka, Namundi, and Nakasiwa, and gradually, they occupied an area extending from Mulenge to the upper Sange River in the north (Uvira Territory) and the Sandja River in the south (Fizi Territory). This settlement is said to have begun approximately "three centuries" ago, during which the group abandoned the ethnonym "Banya-Lenge" in favor of "Ba-Vira". Sebakunzi Ntibibuka similarly attributes the origin of the Banyalenge (or Benelenge) to Chief Lenge, likely a 17th-century migrant from Maniema, a position substantiated by George Weis. Depelchin also records a different tradition that, although it represents the Vira as the earliest inhabitants, also claims they arrived during the reign of the Fuliiru mwami Lwamwe, which would place their settlement after the Fuliiru were already established. Biebuyck, for his part, maintains that the Bahamba clan of Bafuliiru arrived after the Bavira and clashed with them at the Kiliba River, after which they settled north of the Bavira and "somewhat in Bavira country itself. They had their own paramount who did not depend on the Bavira paramount". Congolese Historian Bishikwabo Chubaka notes that "historical accounts from early European observers indicate that the territory along the northwestern shore of the Ruzizi River, from Uvira to Luvungi, was originally part of the Bahamba dynasty of the Bafuliru". He notes that the region was initially sparsely populated, which allowed incoming groups to settle under the nominal authority of the Bahamba mwami, whose power remained relatively decentralized. Chubaka also connects the origins of the Bavira to Lenghe, whom he described as a subject of the mwami of Lwindi. According to Chubaka, traditions recorded in 1972 recount that Lenghe settled in the region after pursuing a buffalo from Lwindi to Kabungulu, where he "chose to settle due to the abundance of game". He subsequently summoned his chief Nalwindi, who dispatched a contingent of skilled hunters to join him. This group pledged allegiance to the Bafuliru mwami, who sanctioned their settlement in order to augment the population, but over time, they developed distinct socio-economic practices, notably adopting fishing from the Zyoba, unlike the predominantly agrarian and pastoral inland Bafuliru.

Despite these differing accounts of origin and sequence, many traditions converge in portraying Bavira's expansion along the lakeshore as relatively gradual and, in some cases, peaceful. One account describes how Kirunga, son of Kiringishe, a chief in Lwindi, entered Uvira during a hunting expedition and found it uninhabited. He then sought investiture of his father and received royal insignia, including the karinga drum. Kirunga was accompanied by seven clans, led by Mugaza, Mufumu, Nabaganda, Muhinga, Nabuhalu, Nalukanga, and Mukono. The Bagaza clan, named after their chief Mugaza, were the first among the Bazyoba to settle, while Kirunga and his followers established themselves at Rumonge, at the foot of Mount Munanira, which later became a sacred site for the Bavira. A common saying in Uvira, "Bandu boshe bafummire Lwindi", meaning "all people come from Lwindi", reflects the central role of this place in regional history. However, some Zyoba traditions point further south, near the Elila River (not far away from Ulindi), which suggests multiple waves of migration. Certain Zyoba clans are believed to have arrived later alongside the Bembe, who initially remained in the mountainous interior.

=== 19th–20th century: missions, migration flows, trade, war, colonial presence ===
By the late nineteenth century, when Catholic missionaries established themselves in Mulueba around 1880, the coastal region of Lake Tanganyika was inhabited by ethnic groups speaking closely related languages, identified at the time as Kizyoba-Kisanze. Zyoba living among the Vira were generally subordinate to Vira authority, though in "Bembeland the memory of petty chiefs among the Zyoba remains vivid, such as Kiri, Suima, Lubungu, Kangeta, Makobola, Lueba, Mulambo".

The Hutu Barundi are believed to have arrived in the region around 1800 under the leadership of Chief Ngabwe of the Bazige clan, a group that was later assimilated by the Fuliiru. According to Biebuyck, they migrated from Burundi and negotiated a settlement with the Bavira, after which they obtained land between the Kiliba and Kawezi rivers in exchange for ivory. The Banyarwanda also settled in the area before European penetration and are said to have left the Kingdom of Rwanda under the leadership of their chief Bugumba to escape the excesses of King Yuhi IV Gahindiro. Upon their arrival, they were granted land in Mulenge by the Bafuliiru, but after the death of their second chief, Kaila, they dispersed throughout the region, often settling in more remote and inaccessible areas.

The first Arab-Swahili traders entered the region during the reign of the Vira chief Lenge II, although they had long been established across the lake in Ujiji. They arrived in small sailing vessels and settled near Bavira and used these locations as bases for organizing slave raids. Over time, the Bavira formed alliances with these groups, particularly in cattle raids against the Rundi, which contributed to the widespread dispersal of the Vira, whose members could soon be found in places such as Bujumbura, Kitega, and Ujiji. This period also gave rise to considerable ethnic heterogeneity and complexity, as evidenced by the diverse composition of personnel at the first mission station of Mulueba, which brought together people from Maniema, Uvira, Burundi, Rwanda, Ubembe, Kasanze, Ubwari, and Marungu.

European presence in the region initially remained limited and sporadic. Early missionaries were forced to relocate several times, first to Kibanga, which they later abandoned due to sleeping sickness, and then to the area of Baudouinville (now Kirungu). It was not until 1933 that a new mission was established in Uvira, followed by another in Baraka in 1947. The "Mission Libre Suédoise" had already been founded in Uvira in 1921, while Baraka later hosted the "Unevangelized Africa Mission". Meanwhile, on 14 February 1897, the Batetela launched a major attack against the eastern Congo Free State during the broader upheavals of the Congo Free State period, advancing from the west through the hills of Fizi Territory toward Uvira under the command of "Tiangufu". This caused panic among local populations who fled into the mountains, and although Belgian forces were initially defeated, they eventually regrouped and succeeded in dispersing the Batetela. By the 1930s-40s, Uvira had become more structured, with the presence of missions, administrative centers, and commercial communities including Greek, Indian, and Arab-Swahili traders, as well as organizations such as Otraco and Cotonco. Bwari fishermen from the Bubwari peninsula regularly crossed the lake in dhows to trade fish at the Kavimvira market. Uvira also maintained strong connections across Lake Tanganyika with Burundi and Tanzania, where many Bembe and Zyoba were established along the shoreline. Along the stretch from Uvira to Baraka, Zyoba villages were interspersed among those of the Vira and Bembe. Villages situated on the Vira side, such as Kalungwe, Kabimba, Kigongo, and Kamba, were predominantly Zyoba, though they often included Bembe. In some cases, such as Kamba, settlements were divided into two halves, one Zoba and one Bembe. In the mountainous hinterland of Uvira, Zyoba settlements were also present in villages such as Kifuto, Kitala, and Munyebungu. On the Bembe side of the lakeshore, villages like Suima and Kiri were widely regarded as primarily Zyoba in character.

== Culture ==
=== Social organization, economy, beliefs, and religion ===
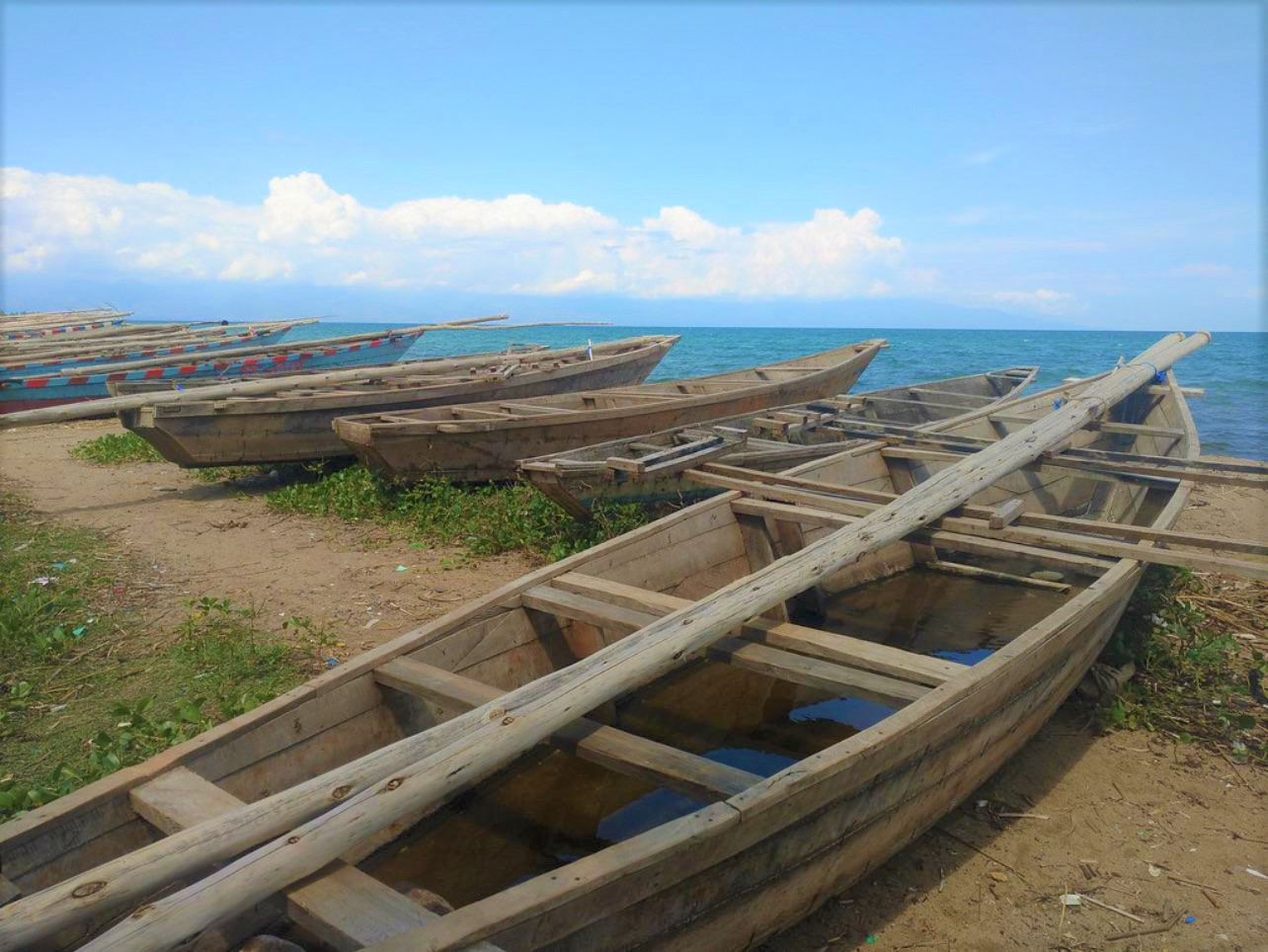
Fishing boats along Lake Tanganyika in Uvira

Zyoba society is organized around clan-based structures and semi-secret associations, including the Mizyuka female society among related Bwari fishermen on the Bubwari Peninsula, which involves ritual dances and communal roles. Their traditional economy oriented toward Lake Tanganyika, with men primarily engaged in nocturnal fishing using dug-out canoes (bwato), nets (kazango, mutaho, kifungatumbo), torches (biomle), and fishing spears (malobo) used to attract fish at night; these canoes, historically crafted by Bembe specialists known as Bagoma working in forest workshops with small groups of assistants over several days, were carved from suitable hardwoods and transported down from the hills to the lake using ropes and vines, and were produced in three main sizes: small (bwato bunini), medium (bwato bwa nzanga), and large (bwato buhamu). Fishing technology also included paddles (kibando) and bamboo poles (mukingi), while torch bundles were often acquired through exchange networks with Fuliru and Rundi in return for dried kalumba fish. Fishing practices were governed by a range of taboos and spiritual beliefs, including sexual abstinence tied to lunar phases, such as prohibitions on intercourse when the moon was kituto above the lake or kabali above the mountains, with fishermen expected to wait until it reached malenga above the head. Poor catches were commonly attributed to spiritual displeasure, ancestral anger, witchcraft, or curses directed at boats and fishing gear.

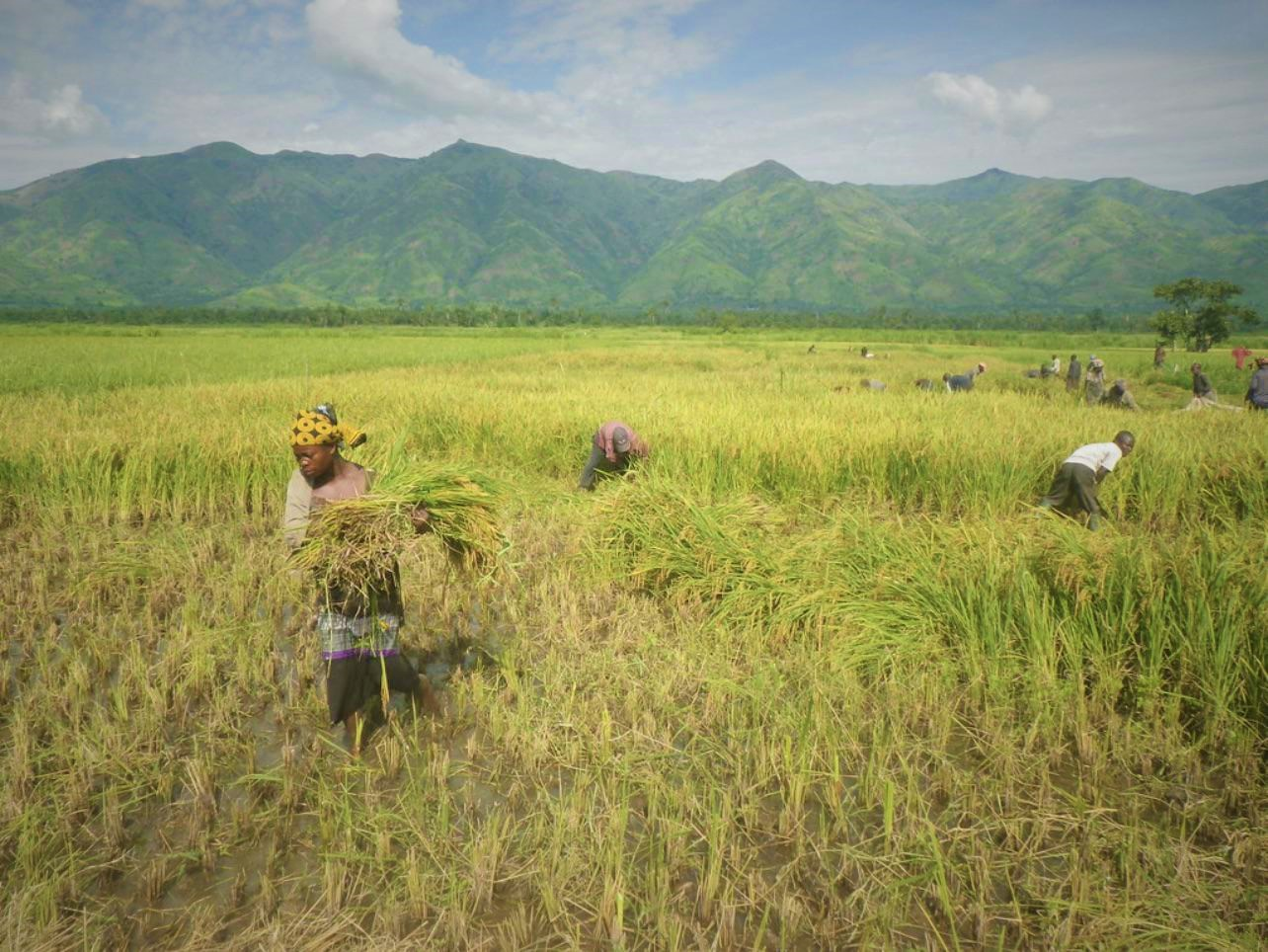
Rice cultivation In the Ruzizi Plain

Agriculture featured staple crops including manioc, maize, peanuts, bananas, beans, peas, millet, and sugar cane, although cotton production was introduced and enforced under colonial administration from 1934 onward; manioc processing tools such as the pounding trough and pestle were adopted from the Bembe, as was the kifumbi stool, while staple foods also included manioc, maize, and the small sardine-like Lake Tanganyika fish known as kafumba. Banana beer production was typically carried out by men, while hunting practices were supported through specialized traps such as kirabo for large game, kakongolo and mwesho for birds, and additional nets and pitfall systems for various animals. Games included kyanga, a mancala-type board game played with 64 sholo seeds, and children's activities such as association football (mupila) and hoop-rolling (goroli).

Religious practices revolve around lake-centered spiritual authority embodied in the figure of Mugazalugulu, who is regarded as the sovereign spirit of the lake and son of Kahungula and Nakulumbata, whose lineage included several children such as Mlubire, Mufumbe, Mutundumulo, Mungeta, Kangula, Muhofu, Kwibe, Mutambala, Nguli, and Wapemba, to whom nocturnal offerings of fish and other goods were made; his cult was mainly served by a female ritual specialist (mufumu), while in broader communal contexts, lineage heads officiated at shrines located near the lakeshore.

=== Trade, music, recreation, and performance ===
Trade networks connected Zyoba villages, such as Kalungwe, Kabimba, Kifuto, and Suima, to markets in Kavimvira and Kamba, exchanging fish, cattle, grains, and manufactured goods. Domestic architecture traditionally consisted of circular mushonge-style houses made of straw or clay, which later evolved into rectangular mud structures under administrative influence, often accompanied by separate kitchens (kitekera) and storage facilities (kitala) used for cotton and dried goods. Daily material culture included locally forged iron tools such as spears (fumo), hoes (fuka), knives (makali), digging bars (musholo), billhooks (mugushu), adzes (mbazo), and axes (shenio), alongside imported pottery vessels such as nyungu, kabindi, and karabo, as well as calabashes and water-pipe devices (kazoo); basketry traditions were shared across neighboring groups, with some styles attributed to Fuliru, Bembe, Vira, and Rundi artisans, while Zyoba production remained comparatively limited. Personal adornment was modest but varied, and hairstyles included limboto, zebwima, and kitapa for girls, and kahala, lumba, and shule for boys.

Music and recreation featured drums (munona), sanzas (likimbi), zeze zithers (kangungu), musical bows (kashamba), calabash rattles with grains (kabunzekere), dog bells (luhegere), pieces of bamboo for percussion for the Nabingi cult (milonge), a cow's horns (kibuga), and small metal bells (yunga).

== See also ==
- Demographics of the Democratic Republic of the Congo
- List of ethnic groups in Tanzania
