= Makobola massacre =

1998–1999 massacre in the Democratic Republic of the Congo

- Part of Second Congo War
- Location: Makobola, Fizi Territory, South Kivu, Democratic Republic of the Congo
- Date: December 30, 1998 – January 2, 1999
- Attack type: Massacre, ethnic cleansing, arson, sexual violence
- Deaths: 800 civilians killed per UN Mapping Report
- Victim: Bembe people
- Perpetrator: Rally for Congolese Democracy (RCD)
- Motive: Allegations that the local population had provided support to the Mai Mai rebels and the government of Laurent-Désiré Kabila.

The Makobola massacre (French: Massacre de Makobola) occurred from December 30, 1998, to January 2, 1999, in the small villages of Makobola and I'amba Basilwamba (also known as Makobola II), located approximately 15 kilometers south of Uvira, on the border between Fizi Territory and Uvira Territory in the South Kivu Province of the Democratic Republic of the Congo (DRC). The Rally for Congolese Democracy (Rassemblement Congolais pour la Démocratie; RCD), a predominantly Tutsi Rwandan-backed armed group led by Ernest Wamba dia Wamba, killed over 800 civilians, largely belonging to the Babembe community.

== Background ==
=== History of ethnic tensions ===
The Fizi Territory has been marred by persistent ethnic tensions between the Bembe people and Banyamulenge, which can be traced back to their long-standing dispute over land and resources. The Banyamulenge are predominantly pastoralists who have migrated from Rwanda in search of better grazing lands, driven by the escalating taxes imposed by Mwami Rwabugiri of the Kingdom of Rwanda, while the Bembe people are predominantly subsistence agriculturalists who have lived in the area for generations, relying on their intimate knowledge of the local terrain and farming practices passed down through their families. The first inter-ethnic tensions were reported as early as the mid-20th when the Belgian colonists imported workers from Ruanda-Urundi to aid their development to Kivu's highlands from the late 1920s to the 1950s. Many of these workers settled in the Fizi Territory, Uvira Territory, and Mwenga Territory, where they came into contact with the Bembe people. However, the Bembe people were wary of the newcomers and were generally hostile towards them, refusing to intermarry.

The Banyamulenge harbored aspirations of having their independent territory, similar to other ethnic groups, but faced resistance due to their status as immigrants without a defined territory or chieftainship before colonization. In 1972, Barthélémy Bisengimana Rwema, a Munyamulenge cabinet director of Mobutu Sese Seko during his second republic, implemented a presidential decree known as "Ordinance № 69-096". This regulation collectively conferred Zairean nationality and property rights to Banyamulenge businessmen, politicians, and Tutsi notables, which was a significant turning point in their struggle for recognition. Nonetheless, the constitutionality of this measure was called into question after Rwema's death due to its nonconformity with fundamental criteria. The act was perceived as an expropriation of land by other Congolese ethnic groups, which further intensified the social and political tensions in the region and deepened the collective unconscious of other Congolese ethnic groups who were resentful towards Tutsis from elsewhere. The 1980s witnessed the intensification of frictions and disputes regarding the citizenship status of Banyamulenge. The exclusion of their candidates from the 1982 and 1987 elections under the pretext of nationalité douteuse (doubtful citizenship) sparked widespread animosity. Furthermore, the Congolese government organized a census in 1991, explicitly aimed at identifying Congolese citizens, which was discriminatory against Hutu and Tutsi populations. This census led to widespread social unrest, causing deep divisions and polarization within the Congolese society.

=== Second Congo War ===
During the Second Congo War, the once-formidable alliance between Rwanda, Uganda, and the Congolese government disintegrated in 1998 when Laurent Désiré Kabila attempted to assert his independence from his former allies. This decision did not bode well with Rwanda and Uganda, who regarded Kabila as an impediment to their regional interests.

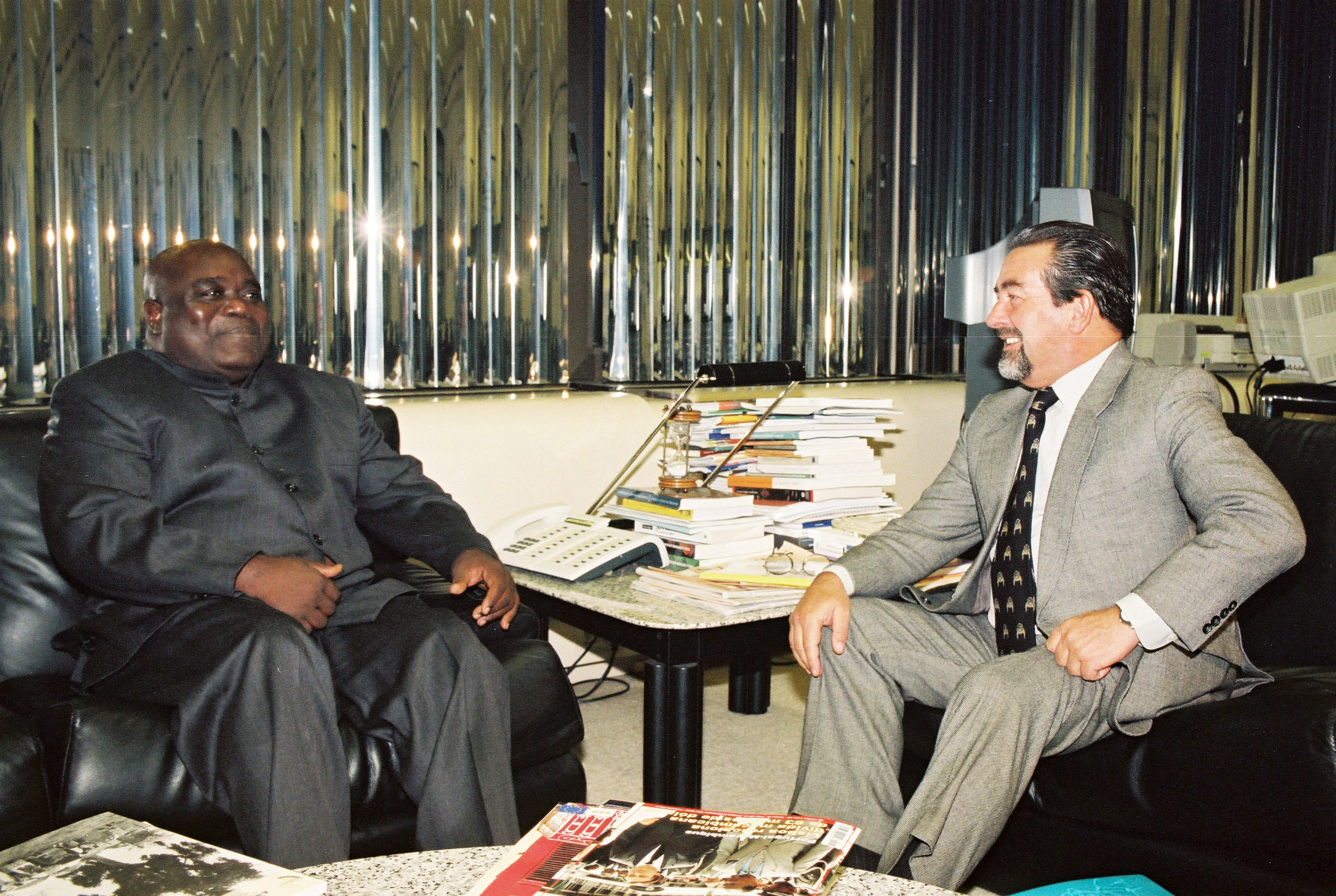
Visit of Laurent-Désiré Kabila to the EC, discussing the armed conflict raging in the area, November 1998

The Kabila's government was accused of excluding Tutsis from political representation, allegedly due to ethnic tensions and suspicions that Tutsis were aligned with Rwanda's interests rather than those of the DRC. Kabila perceived the Tutsis as a potential threat to his regime and therefore aimed to consolidate his power by marginalizing them. In response, Tutsi opposition leaders founded the Congolese Rally for Democracy (RCD) with the aim of toppling his government. Furthermore, Rwanda and Uganda's hunger for natural resources in the eastern part of the DRC presented an economic opportunity, but the Kabila administration hindered their aspirations for financial gain.

In response to the RCD rebels, numerous militant factions, such as the Maï Maï, gained extensive support from the "indigenous" populace and the Kabila government, leading them to rise up against the RCD. Composed of diverse ethnic and regional groups, the Mai-Mai organizations initially prioritized safeguarding their local communities from external forces, including the RCD and its allies, Rwanda and Uganda. The local population has been targeted by violence, ranging from brutal physical assaults to savage massacres such as that of Makobola in I'amba Basilwamba village.

== Attack ==
The attack took place in the village of Makobola, predominantly inhabited by the Bembe people, roughly 15 kilometers south of Uvira on the border of the Fizi and Uvira territories in the eastern region of the DRC. According to reports from both the Rome-based Roman Catholic Missionary News Service and the Los Angeles Times in January 1999, RCD forces arrived in Makobola on New Year's Day and launched an indiscriminate killing spree against the local population.

Eyewitnesses and survivors reported that the soldiers attacked the village and its inhabitants using a variety of weapons, including guns, machetes, and other sharp objects. The RCD forces went on a rampage, killing men, women, and children indiscriminately. The village chief, Juma Lubambo M'sambya III, an eyewitness and survivor of the massacre was very instrumental in denouncing the massacre and the first in helping national and international investigators document the casualties and share details of the tragedy with the wider world.

Many of the victims were hacked to death with machetes or shot at close range, while others were burned alive or drowned in nearby rivers. The soldiers threw babies and small children into deep pit latrines and rivers, where they were left to die, and shot adults who disobeyed orders to enter a house and instead tried to escape. In addition to the human toll, the assailants also destroyed homes and other property in the village. Buildings were burned or looted, and livestock and crops were stolen or killed. The attack was believed to have been carried out as a retaliatory measure against an earlier attack by Mai-Mai fighters, who had infiltrated the Uvira region from Fizi and averted the RCD rebels from gaining access to a new position near the village of I'amba Basilwamba (Makobola II). As a retaliatory measure, rebel reinforcements were hastily dispatched from Uvira to Makobola. Upon arrival, they unleashed a wave of violence upon the local population, while the Mai-Mai soldiers were able to escape into the surrounding forests.

== Death toll ==
=== The figures ===
The death toll of the Makobola massacre remains a topic of debate due to the scarcity of historical records and inconsistencies in the counting methods employed. Numerous sources have presented varying statistics, which has led to heated discussions in both political and academic debates.

The Missionary International Service News Agency (MISNA), a prominent Roman Catholic humanitarian information network, was the first to report the massacre, which took place between December 30 and January 2. According to MISNA, at least 500 innocent civilians were brutally massacred by the RCD forces of the Banyamulenge community as a retaliatory measure against an attack by the Mai Mai in the area.

However, other sources have provided much higher estimates of the death toll. The Los Angeles Times reported that over 600 people were killed during the Makobola massacre. The final report of the participatory consultations for the development of the Poverty Reduction Strategy Document (DSRP) produced in December 2004, put the number of fatalities at 630. Meanwhile, the Mapping Exercise Report recorded a staggering 800 deaths in Makobola and the neighboring village of I'amba Basilwamba (I'amba, Bangwe, Katuta, Mikunga, and Kasekezi).

=== Suppression of investigation and concealment of the massacre ===
The RCD forces and their leaders deliberately downplayed and distorted the number of victims to hide the enormity of their crimes. Moreover they destroyed and concealed evidence of the atrocities committed in the village, making it challenging to arrive at an accurate estimate of the number of victims. The provincial governor at that time, Norbert Basengezi Katintima (now the vice-president of the Commission Electorale Nationale Indépendante; CENI), minimized the killings and even criticized the Missionary International Service News Agency, which had reported the massacre. His position was supported by the president of the RCD, Wamba Dia Wamba, who went as far as declaring that any investigation into the massacre should be met with lethal force by rebel troops.

It wasn't until the aftermath of the massacre, with the release of information from survivors, eyewitnesses, and the discovery of village documentation under the leadership of Juma Lubambo M'sambya III, Chief of I'amba Basilwamba (Makobola II) village, whose office was destroyed by rebels during the massacre, that the true extent of the massacre became widely known. Current estimates from both historians and news sources indicate that the Makobola massacre claimed the lives of over 800 people.

== Aftermath ==
The massacre sent shockwaves throughout the country, eliciting widespread outrage and revulsion among the Congolese populace, as well as prominent opposition politicians. Seven people involved in the massacre were sentenced to death by court-martial, with four others also receiving the same sentence. The scale of the violence prompted a swift response from the government, with President Laurent-Désiré Kabila taking decisive action to bring the perpetrators to justice. He ordered troops from Angola, Zimbabwe, Chad and Namibia to be deployed to the eastern part of the country, where the massacre had taken place.

The international community also condemned the massacre and called for action to be taken. Kofi Annan, the former Secretary-General of the United Nations, expressed his deep concern for the victims in a letter read by his spokesman, Fred Eckhard. Annan promised to continue to support current regional efforts to broker a ceasefire, withdraw foreign troops, and broaden the democratic peace in the country. He urged world leaders to take proactive measures to ensure that justice was served and that perpetrators were held accountable for their actions. He also reminded the world that a similar decision had been made regarding the August 1998 massacre at Kasika, also in South Kivu, and expressed his regret that the conclusions of that investigation had not been made public yet.

The aftermath of the massacre was marked by grief and anger, as the families of the victims struggled to come to terms with their loss. The Bembe provincial deputies, chiefs, and members of the local population congregate to erect numerous monuments and memorials throughout the region, serving as reminders of the tragedy. The monuments and memorials were constructed using a variety of materials, including stone, concrete, and metal. Many of them were adorned with inscriptions, symbols, and other features that were intended to convey the gravity and solemnity of the tragedy. The monuments were strategically placed in public areas, such as village squares and parks.
