= Baraka, Democratic Republic of the Congo =

Baraka
- Town
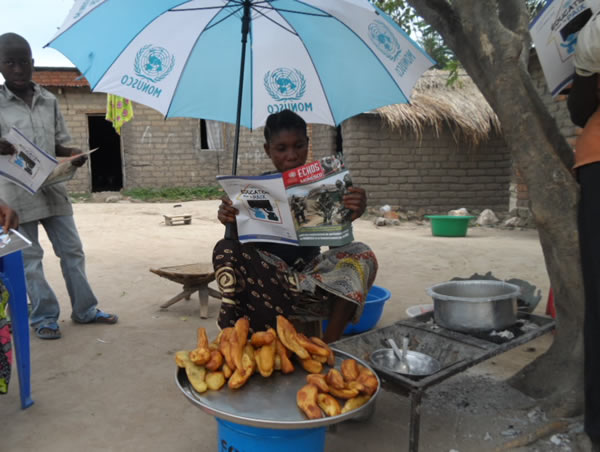
- Sweet potatoes saleswoman in Baraka Mwambangu

- Location within Democratic Republic of the Congo
- Coordinates: 4.104123°S 29.094035°E
- Country: Democratic Republic of the Congo
- Province: South Kivu
- Territory: Fizi Territory

Population (2014)
  - Total: 120,000

Baraka, also known as Bala'a, is the main city and metropolitan center of the Fizi Territory located in the South Kivu Province in the eastern region of the Democratic Republic of the Congo (DRC). Baraka is bordered by the Lweba River to the north, the Mutambala River to the south, Lake Tanganyika to the east, and the Lu'e River, Efuma Mountain, and Makundu Mountain to the west.

Baraka was a small fishing village. In 1882, the village became the first administrative entity in Kivu to adopt an urban model. On February 10, 2010, Baraka was granted city status by the national and provincial governments. The city has a population of approximately 120,000 residents as of 2014, with the majority being Swahili and Ebembe-speaking. Other estimates give 90,000. The name of the city means "blessing" in Swahili.

The city comprises four municipalities: Baraka Center, Katanga, Kalundja, and Kafulo-Malikya. Within its urban center, Mmoma, Maison Escale, and Ibase are densely populated districts that form part of the commercial and financial centers.

== Geography ==
The city stretches from the Lweba River to the Mutambala River, and along the shores of Lake Tanganyika. An aerodrome lies at the heart of the city, surrounded by modern villas. Baraka is situated south of Bukavu, Goma, and Uvira, north of Kalemie and Lubumbashi, east of Kindu, and west of Kigoma and Bujumbura.

=== Climate ===
Baraka is located at 04° 05′ 38" S 29° 04′ 58" E, on the shore of Lake Tanganyika, at an average altitude of 820 meters. The climate is of the tropical type, providing abundant sunshine throughout the year, with an average temperature of 23 °C. The highest temperatures reach 26 - 30 °C during the hottest periods. Baraka experiences two distinct seasons: the dry season and the rainy season.

=== Hydrology ===
Baraka's territory is encompassed by the drainage basin of Lake Tanganyika, along with two major rivers: Mutambala and Nemba. There are other rivers, including Lweba, Lwindi, Luke, Mukera, Mwemezi, Kiriza and Rubana. The water from these rivers flows into Lake Tanganyika, creating a vast plain along the riverbanks and the lake. The oil field is located near the mouths of the Mutambala and Nemba Rivers. The lime deposits extend across the entire Ubwari Peninsula to the east of the city and the western regions of Baraka, including Mwasombo, Mwambangu, Mongemonge and Mwatembo. The high plateaus of Baraka Island contain deposits of gold, diamonds, coltan, tin, bauxite, iron, manganese, coal, cobalt, nickel, and peat.

== History ==
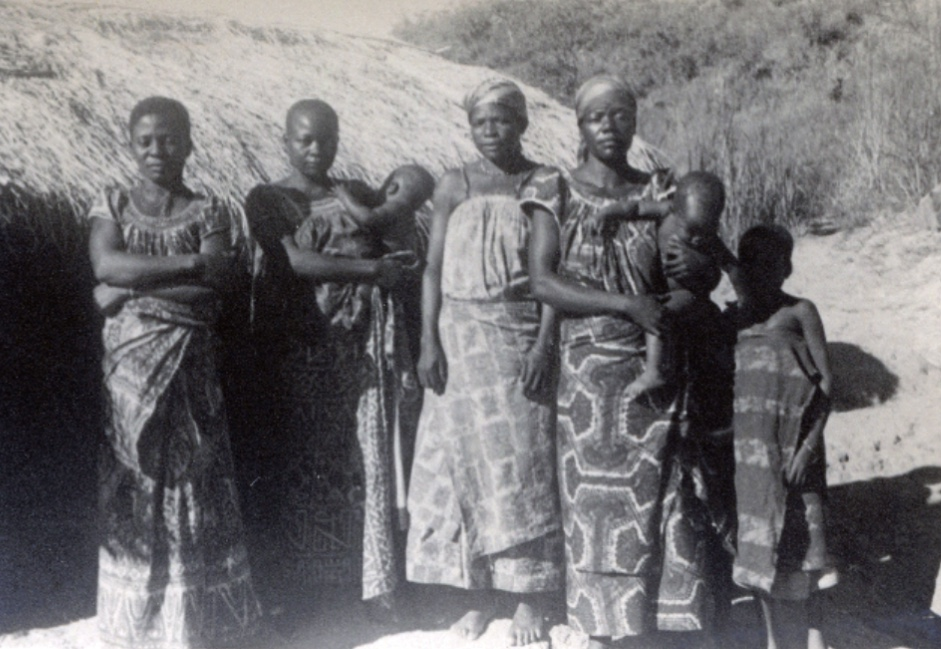
Bembe women involved in the Uhulana ceremony, ca. 1950s by Daniel P. Biebuyck.

Historically, the area was inhabited by the Bembe, Bwari, and Buyu peoples. According to Bembe's oral tradition, Baraka was their ancestral domain, where they descended from the Kivu highlands to engage in piscatorial pursuits for sustenance, and utilizing the beaches for rituals, marking them a propitious locale for navigation to explore the distant shores of Lake Tanganyika. During this period, the Bembes named the lake "Étanga 'ya ni'a," which is often believed to be the etymological precursor to "Tanganyika."

During the mid-19th century colonial era, Baraka, Ubwari, and Kibanga were collectively named "Burton Bay" in honor of the famed European explorer Richard Francis Burton. At the same time, the Catholic missionaries, including P. Théophile Dromaux, Fr. François Coulbois, and Fr. Henri Delaunay, chose to call Kibanga as Lavigerieville. Lavigerieville derived from a congregation of Belgian missionaries in Africa and a former bishop. The Catholic missionaries of that time agreed upon the name Lavigerieville. Meanwhile, other settlers considered naming Baraka as Ligerzville, as it resembled Ligerz.

=== Indian Ocean slave trade ===
Baraka was founded by the Arab-Swahilis in the 19th century for the purpose of triangular trade. Up until 1894, when the Arab-Swahili slave traders—mainly warlords engaged in the Indian Ocean slave trade—were driven out from Maniema by the Force Publique, the Fizi Territory was intersected by a slave route that stretched from Nyangwe, through Kabambare and Kalembelembe, to Baraka, where slaves were brought in.

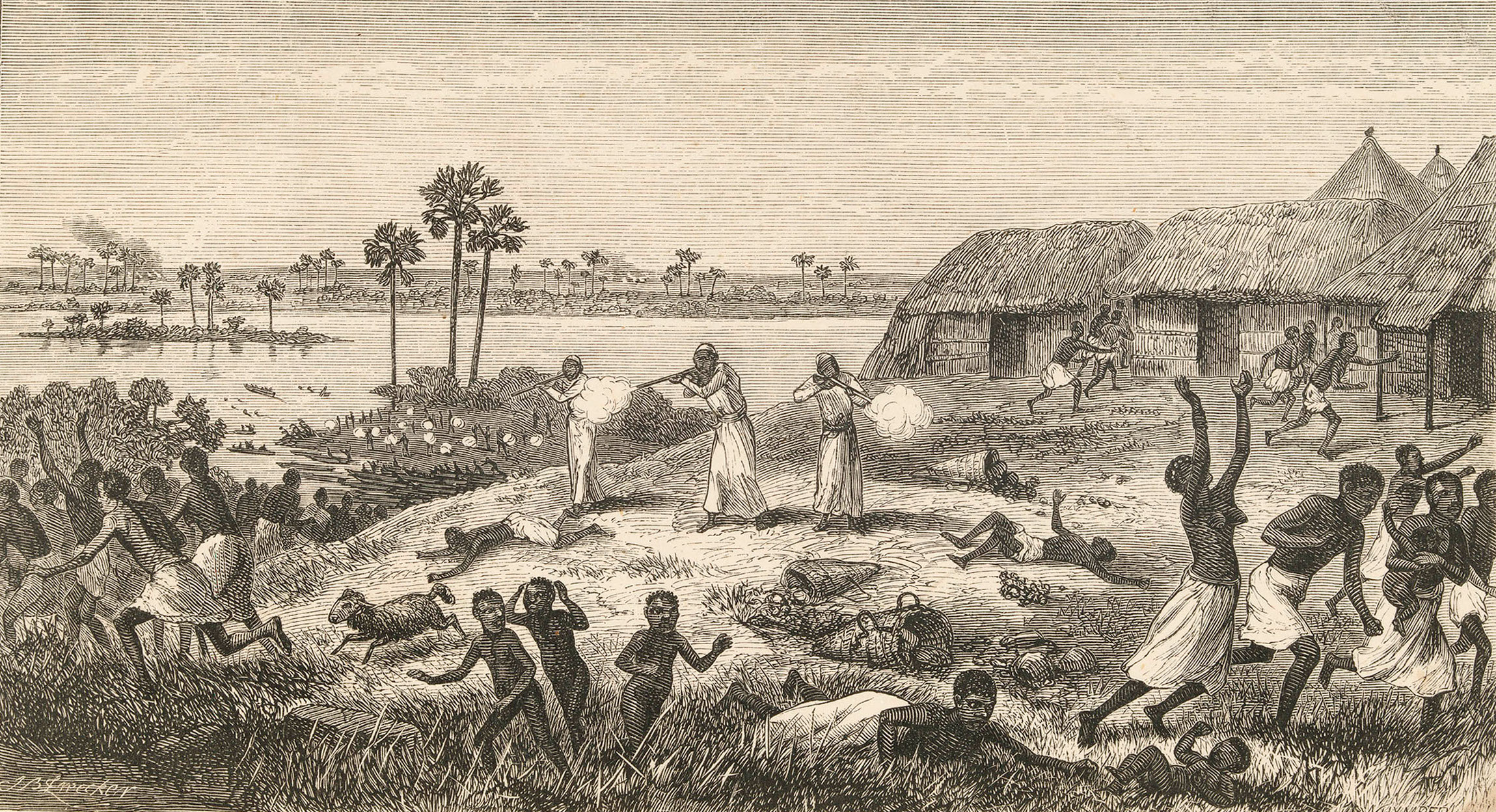
Three men of Dugumbé ben Habib raiding the market of Nyangwe, July 15th, 1871

Baraka emerged as a major trading center with a large port for holding enslaved people from Kasongo and transporting them to Ujiji in Tanzania. Around 1890, the Force Publique removed Arab-Swahili presence along Lake Tanganyika to prevent interference with their colonization of Congo Free State (État indépendant du Congo). Using the pretext of anti-slavery efforts, they launched a military expedition to protect indigenous populations from the slave trade in the eastern part of the Congo Free State. Military operations were carried out in late 1894, resulting in Baraka becoming a Congo Free State colony after a battle between the Arab-Swahilis and the Force Publique.

=== World War I, Independence movements and security problems ===
During World War I, the Belgians drove out the Germans from Baraka by occupying Kigoma and Tabora in Tanzania, as well as Bujumbura and Rumonge in Burundi, in 1916 under the command of the Force Publique.

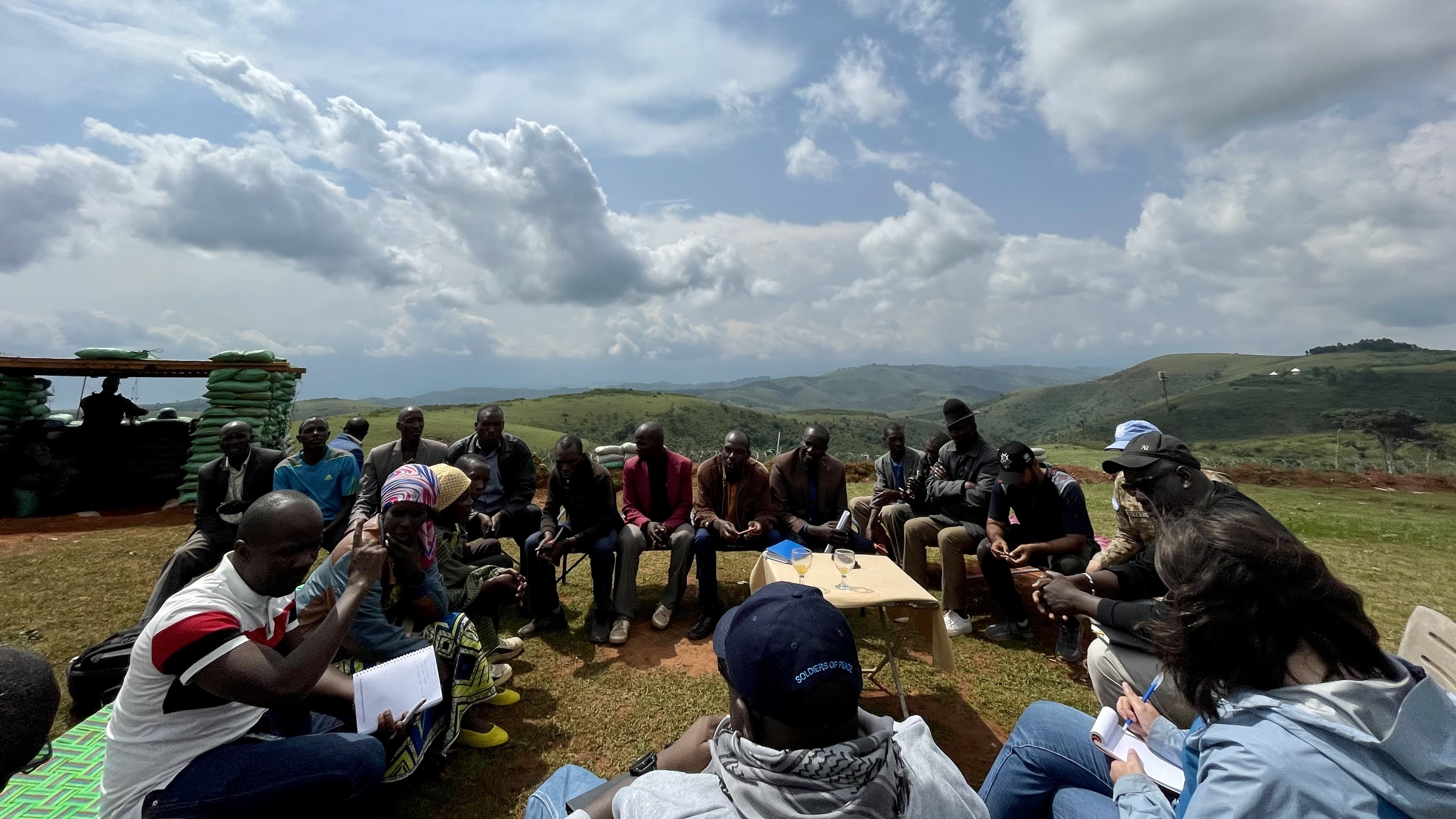
2022

The region also played a key role in the 20th century by supporting the independence movement, hosting the Lumumbists and the Mulelists. In 1957, a revolt against the oppressive system led by Mr. Émbolo of the Bembe ethnic group erupted in the Katanga commune. Émbolo was later arrested, imprisoned in Bukavu, and released after one year of penance. In the 1960s, the city was at the center of cross-border Maoist insurgency started by Laurent-Désiré Kabila. It continued well until the 1980s. The population of the city considerably decreased during the Civil war in the Democratic Republic of the Congo, during which the city was under control of the Rwanda-backed Rally for Congolese Democracy. After the end of the war, people started to return and take jobs, mainly in the trade.

In 2014, the city drew attention as a pilot project for the Missing Maps project.

As of 2015, in Baraka there were no paved roads, no running water, and no electricity.

In October 2021 MONUSCO opened a base nearby that allowed 7,000 people to return. In February 2022 they created a temporary base north of Baraka to deal with Mai-Mai attacks.
