= Daniel P. Biebuyck =

Belgian art historian (1925–2019)

Daniel P. Biebuyck (1925 – 31 December 2019) was a Belgian scholar of Central African art.

== Biography ==
Biebuyck was born in 1925 in Deinze, Belgium. He studied classical philology, law, cultural anthropology, and African art at the State University of Ghent, where he obtained his doctorate in Philosophy and Letters (1954). He conducted post-graduate study in social anthropology and Bantu Linguistics at University College London, LSE, SOAS. Under the auspices of the Institut pour la Recherche Scientifique en Afrique central (IRSAC), he was involved in field research from 1949–1957 among ethnic groups in what is now the Democratic Republic of the Congo. From 1957–1961 he taught at Lovanium University in Kinshasa and as a member of the land tenure commission for the Belgian Congo, he conducted brief field research among over 40 different populations where he studied questions pertaining to the relationships between sociopolitical structures, administrative interferences, and land tenure.

His fieldwork concentrated on the Lega, Bembe, Zyoba and Nyanga peoples.Biebuyck was initiated to the various grades of the Bwami initiation of the Lega.

== Fieldwork ==
- 1957–1961 Intermittent brief periods of fieldwork among some fifty different Congo populations, including Zande, Agbarambo, Mangbetu, Malele, Mangbele, Mayogo, Meegye, Mamvu, Bwa, Yew, Mabinza (Ngombe), Mongelima (Baboro), Bira, Lese, Talinga, Mbuba, Lendu, Aluur, Leka, Pere, Komo, Havu, Nande, Tembo, Hunde, Vira, Fuliro (Fulero), Shi, Luba-Kasai, Kongo-Bavungani, Kongo-Ntandu, Teke-Mfinu, Wuum, Mongo (Ekota and Bakutu), Yeke, Sanga. This fieldwork was sponsored by the Land Tenure Commission for the Congo, and some by Lovanium University (Kinshasa) and Liège University (Belgium).
- 1954–1957 Nyanga people (Walikale zone, eastern Congo montane rain forest) including also research among the Baremba (Pygmies), Baasa and Batiri (Komo-related) and some Hunde-related groups. Sponsored by IRSAC, Brussels.
- 1952–1953, 1955, 1957 Lega people (Mwenga, Shabunda, Pangi zones, South Kivu and Manyema districts in Kivu Province, eastern Congo rain forest) including short periods of research among the Nyindu, Mbote, Vira, Furiiru, Basikasingo, Konjo, Leka, Batali (Binja), Kwame, Kanu, Binja, Boyo. Sponsored by IRSAC, Brussels.
- 1949–1952 Zyoba people (heterogeneous groups of Pygmy, Luba, Hemba, Lunda and uncertain origins who are riverains on the Western shores of Lake Tanganyika) and Bembe people (Fizi and Mwenga zones, South-Kivu district in the Kivu Province, eastern Congo highlands). Sponsored by IRSAC, Brussels.

In 1989, Biebuyck retired from the University of Delaware as H. Rodney Sharp Professor of Anthropology and the Humanities. As professor, adjunct or visiting professor, he taught at the following universities: University of Delaware, Lovanium University, Liège University, London University, University of California at Los Angeles, Yale University, New York University, University of South Florida: Golding Distinguished Professor of African art.

== Publications ==
Biebuyck's major publications are in the fields of central African Art, Epic literature, systems of land tenure, and general ethnography. Many were sponsored by grants from National Endowment for the Humanities (NEH), John Simon Guggenheim Foundation, Rockefeller Foundation, Social Science Research Council (SSRC) and the universities of Delaware and California. In addition to numerous articles and reports on different facets of African arts.

Books

- 2013 Sherungu Muriro, Mémoires d’un Nyanga. Paris: Geuthner
- 2002 Lega. Ethics and beauty in the heart of Africa. Gent: Snoeck-Ducaju & Zoon.(Separate editions in Dutch and in French)
- 2002 Mwendo: une épopée Nyanga (RdC) Paris: Classiques Africains. This French translation of the Mwindo Epic (1969) includes an expanded introduction, footnotes, a glossary. Text prepared by Daniel P. Biebuyck in collaboration with Brunhilde Biebuyck and Mihaela Bacou.
- 1996 With Susan Kelliher and Linda McCrae. African Ethnonyms. Index to Art-Producing Peoples of Africa. New York: G.K. Hall and Co. An Imprint of Simon and Schuster Macmillan. London: Prentice Hall International. 378pp.
- 1994 Lega Sculpture. Sculpture lega. Paris and New York: Galerie Hélène and Philippe Leloup. 203 pp, including 87 pls. (French text by Brunhilde Biebuyck and Mihaela Bacou.)
- 1987 The Arts of Central Africa: An Annotated Bibliography. Boston: G.K. Hall. 300 pp.
- 1987 With Brunhilde Biebuyck. We Test Those Whom We Marry: An Analysis of Thirty-Six Nyanga Tales. Budapest: African Research Program, Loránd Eötvös University. 115 pp.
- 1985 The Arts of Zaire. Southwestern Zaire, vol. 1. Berkeley and Los Angeles: University of California Press. 416 pp. and 100 pls.
- 1986 The Arts of Zaire. Eastern Zaire: The Ritual and Artistic Contexts of Voluntary Associations, vol. 2. Berkeley and Los Angeles: The University of California Press, 331 pp. and 98 pls.
- 1984 with Nelly Van den Abbeele. The Power of Headdresses: A Cross-Cultural Study of Forms and Functions. Ghent (Belgium): Snoeck-Ducaju en Zoon. 293 pp. and 223 pls.
- 1981 Statuary from the Pre-Bembe Hunters: Issues in the Interpretation of Ancestral Figurines Ascribed to the Basikasingo-Bembe-Boyo. Tervuren: Musée royal de l’Afrique centrale. 164 pp. and 59 pls.
- 1978 Hero and Chief: Epic Literature from the Banyanga (Zaire Republic). Berkeley and Los Angeles: University of California Press. 320 pp; edited excerpts from one of the Mwindo epics in Oral Epics from Africa, eds Johnson, J.W., Thomas A. Hale, and Stephen Belcher, pp. 285–301, Bloomington: Indiana University Press, 1997; edited excerpts from one of the epics in Les épopées d’Afrique noire, eds Kesteloot, Lilyan and Bassirou Dieng, pp. 528–537.
- 1973 Lega Culture: Art, Initiation, and Moral Philosophy among a Central African People. Berkeley and Los Angeles: University of California Press. 268 pp. and 110 pls.
- 1970 With Kahombo Mateene. Une anthologie de la littérature orale Nyanga. Brussels: Académie royale des Sciences d’Outre-Mer. 363 pp. The short Kahindo epic included in this publication is published in translation in Oral Epics from Africa, eds Johnson, John W. et al., pp. 294–301. Bloomington: Indiana University Press 1997.
- 1969 With Kahombo Mateene. The Mwindo Epic from the Banyanga. Berkeley and Los Angeles: University of California Press; University of California Press Paperbacks, 1971. 213 pp. Several reprint editions and translations into Lingala, Japanese, Hungarian, French, Dutch.
- 1969 Editor. Tradition and Creativity in Tribal Art. Berkeley and Los Angeles: University of California Press; University of California Press Paperbacks, 1973. 236 pp. (Contributions by William Fagg, William Bascom, Robert Goldwater, Jean Guiart, Roy Sieber, Ignacio Bernal, Adriaan Gerbrands, Robert F. Thompson; introduction by D. Biebuyck).
- 1963 Ed. African Agrarian Systems. London: Oxford University Press. Reprint edition, 1966. 407 pp. (Contributions by leading authorities from Belgium, France, Holland, United Kingdom, United States of America, South African Republic).
- 1958 With J. Bolle, E. Schaefer, H. Brandt, and H. Sielman. Les Seigneurs de la Forêt. Brussels: établissements Malvaux. 142 pp. Translated into German and Dutch.
- 1956 De hond bij de Nyanga: ritueel en sociologie. Brussels: Académie royale des Sciences d’Outre-Mer. 168 pp. In Dutch. Unpublished translation in French by Marianne Okito (computer).

Short Monographs

- 1977 Symbolism of the Lega Stool. Working Papers in the Traditional Arts. Philadelphia: ISHI.
- 1966 Rights in Land and its Resources among the Nyanga. Brussels: Académie royale des Sciences d’Outre-Mer.
- 1962 Les Mitamba: système de mariages enchaînés chez les Babembe. Brussels: Académie royale des Sciences d’Outre-Mer.
- 1961 With Mary Douglas. Congo Tribes and Parties. London: Royal Anthropo. Institute.
- 1957 With Jean Dufour and Y. Kennes. Bibliographie sur la tenure des terres et les problèmes fonciers. Léopoldville: Gouvernement Général.
- 1957 With Jean Dufour. Le problème foncier: synthèse et propositions. Léopoldville: Land Tenure Commission.
- 1956 Bibliographie sur la tenure et les problèmes fonciers. Léopoldville: Gouvernement Général.
