= Bembe people =

Ethnic group from Democratic Republic of Congo & Western Tanzania

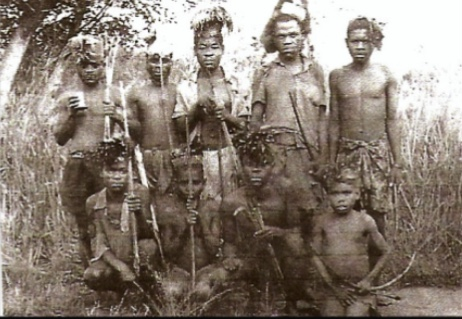

Regions with significant populations
- DRC: 1 500 000 (2005)

Languages
- Bembe language, Swahili, Lingala

Religion
- Christianity, Islam, Malkia Waubembe

Related ethnic groups
- Lega, Bangubangu, Zimba, Hemba, Buyu, Tabwa, Nyindu, Fuliiru, Vira

Bembe
- Person: Mubembe
- People: Babembe
- Language: Kibembe
- Country: Ubembe

The Bembe people (Babembe in the plural) are an ethnic group based in the eastern Democratic Republic of the Congo and western Kigoma Region of Tanzania. They live mainly in the territory of Fizi in South Kivu. The Bembe are also in the province of Tanganyika in the city of Kalemie. In 1991, the Bembe population of the DRC was estimated to number 252,000 and around 1.5 million in 2005.

They are representative of many ethnic traditions, including pre-Lega, Boyo-Kunda, Hemba and Bemba.

== Cultural region ==
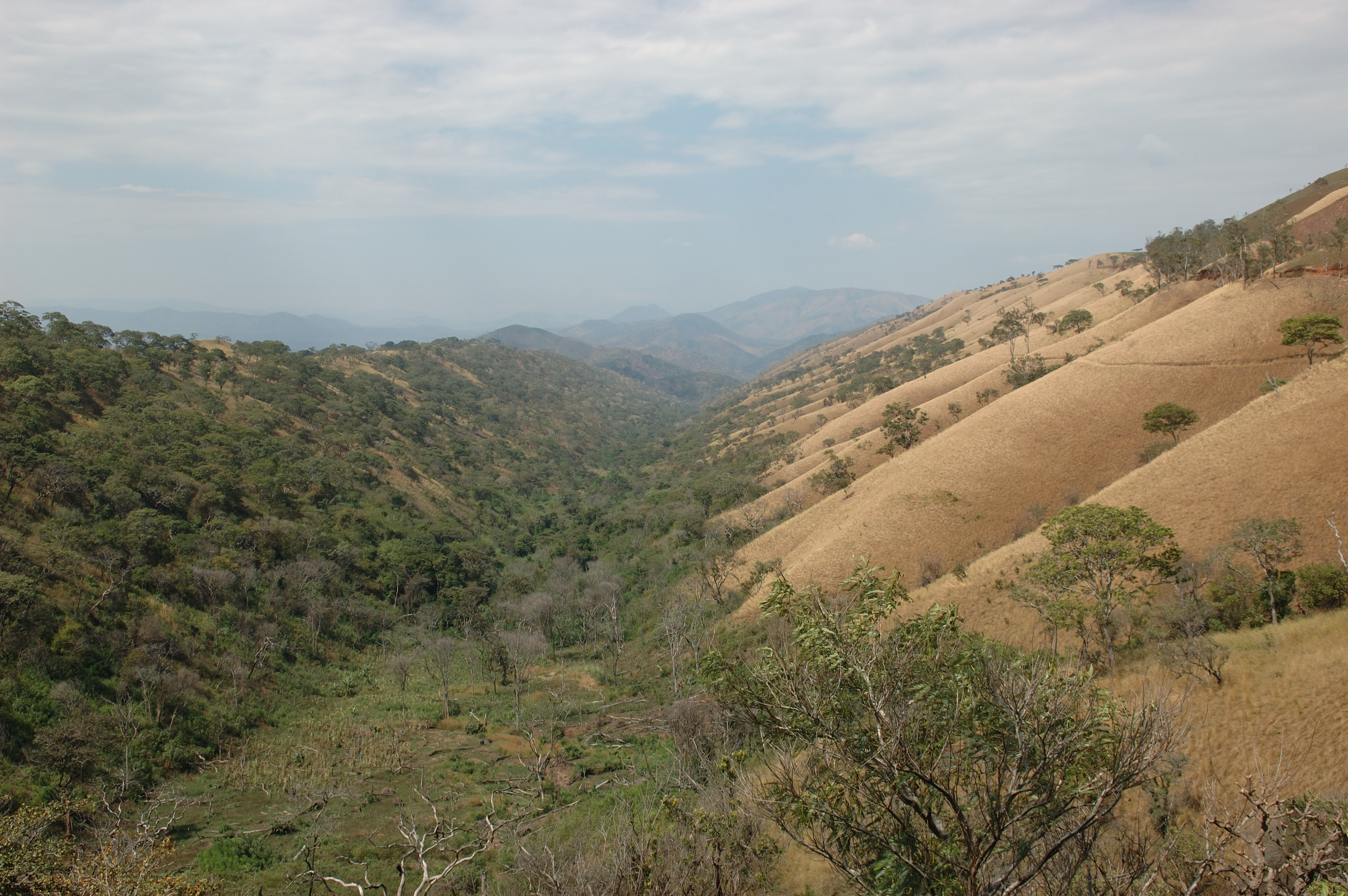
Fizi Territory, South Kivu

The Bembe cultural region, historically and ethnographically known as Ubembe, is situated to the west of Lake Tanganyika, encompassing the present-day Fizi Territory and the Itombwe Mountains. The term Ubembe literally denotes "land of the Bembe", and its historic motto, Esse, Ebalo ("The Land, The Earth"). In the precolonial period, such territorial designations in the Great Lakes region typically began with the prefix U, as seen in names like Uvira, Urega, Ugoma, Ubwari, Ukaramba, Ujiji, and Urundi. In 1883, Captain Edward Coode Hore, a British explorer and the first collector of two of Lake Tanganyika's most notable endemic species, such as Chytra kirkii and Tiphobia horei, applied similar linguistic conventions when studying the "twelve tribes" of the lake. In his work On the Twelve Tribes of Tanganyika, Hore identified Ubembe on his ethnographic map as a territory bordering Umassanze, Uvira, Ukaramba, Ugoma, and Uzige. According to Hore's cartographic observations, Uzige corresponds to modern Bushi, while Uvira aligns with the contemporary Uvira Territory, extending from Ruvenga (modern Luvungi), Kavimba (modern Kavimvira), and Ruhanga (modern Luanga) to Bemba (modern Pemba). Ubemba (Ubembe) stretched from Bemba (Pemba) through Mkabondo's (Abondoki), Ngofi (Ngobi), Kabogi (Aboke or Mboko), Mgawezi (Mkweci), and up to the Ruwewa River (modern Lweba). Msamsi (Umasanzi) likely referred to the area extending from the Ruwewa River (modern Lweba) through Mgamazi (Mkemakye River) to the Mutambara River (Mtambala). Ukaramba appears to correspond to Nemba, Ubwari to Kirira or Mizimu (the present-day Ubwari Peninsula), and Ugoma to Mkanganja (today's Ngandja Sector). Languages were linguistically classified by prefixing the noun class marker Ki to the root of the respective place names. Thus, Kikongo, Kibembe, Kivira, and Kirundi denoted the languages of the Kongo, Bembe, Vira, and Rundi peoples, respectively. For instance, the Bembe speak Kibembe, the Vira speak Kivira, and the Fuliiru speak Kifuliiru.

=== Early inhabitants ===
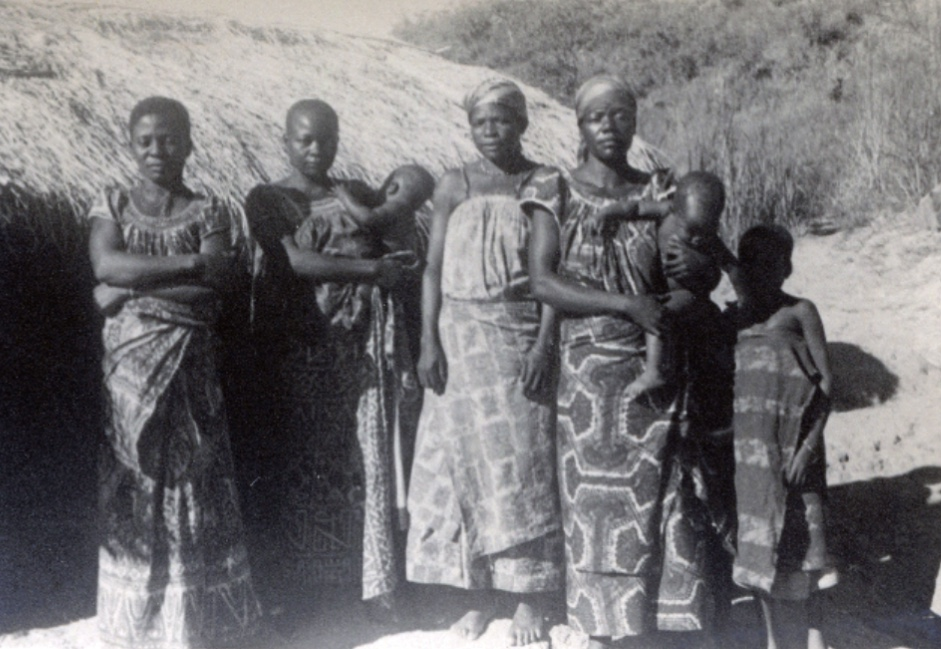
Bembe women participating in the Uhulana ceremony. Photographed by Daniel P. Biebuyck, circa 1950s.

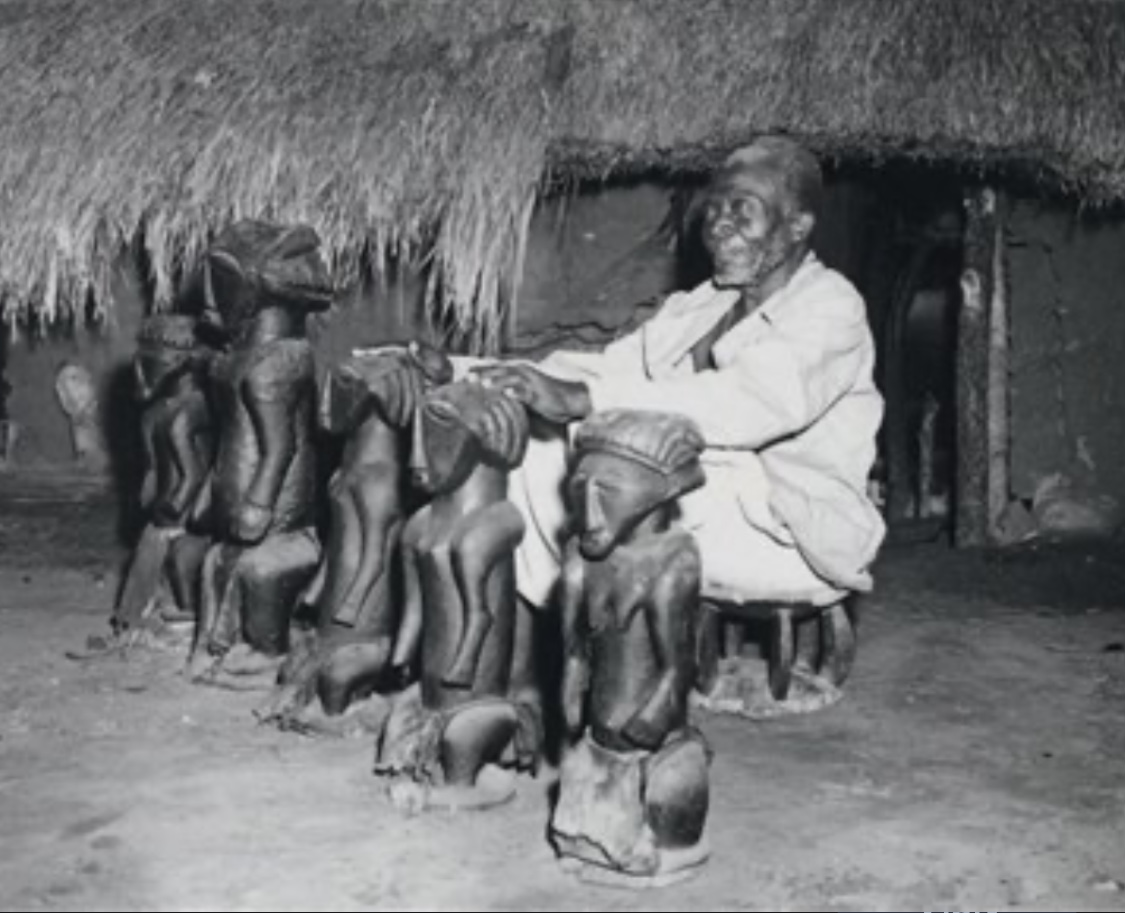
An elderly Bembe man seated indoors, dressed in traditional attire, engaged in a cultural and spiritual practice. Photographed by Daniel P. Biebuyck, circa 1950s.

Before the full consolidation of the Bembe settlement, Ubembe was already home to several distinct ethnic groups. The Belgian scholar of Central African art Daniel P. Biebuyck identified among its earliest inhabitants the Babuyu, Basanze, Babwari, Banyindu, Bazoba, Bagoma, Bakalangwa, Bakeci, and Basikamanya. These groups were established long before the arrival of the Bembe and were primarily concentrated along the shores of Lake Tanganyika and its surrounding hinterland. Gradually, as part of the southward Bantu migrations, the Bembe came to dominate the highland and mid-altitude regions of what became known as Ubembe. Scholarly debates arose concerning their origins; Alfred Moeller de Laddersous advanced the claim that Ubembe had originally belonged to the Masanze, alleging that the Babembe were immigrant invaders from Umassanze who had entered from the east. However, subsequent researchers have largely rejected this hypothesis as historically unfounded and ethnologically flawed. The Babembe are of Bantu stock, and both Umasanze and Ubembe were distinct polities, albeit neighbors. Evidence from the Bulletin No. 91 (January–February 1892) of the Missionaries of Africa supports this distinction, stating:

"After having ravaged and depopulated Masanze, the Ubwari Peninsula, part of Ubembe, and Ubujue, the Wangwana of Rumaliza came to establish posts near the missionaries of Kibanga".

Such testimony demonstrates that Umassanze and Ubembe were separate entities. The Belgian Society of Engineers and Industrialists (Société Belge des Ingénieurs et des Industriels, 1912) also noted:

"On the western shore [of Lake Tanganyika], there are two clearly distinct races: the Wabembe, southwest of Uvira, who are divided into two groups, the lake Wabembe and the mountain Wabembe, and, at the level and to the west of the Uvira post, the small industrious tribe of the Wavira. All of Bantu blood".

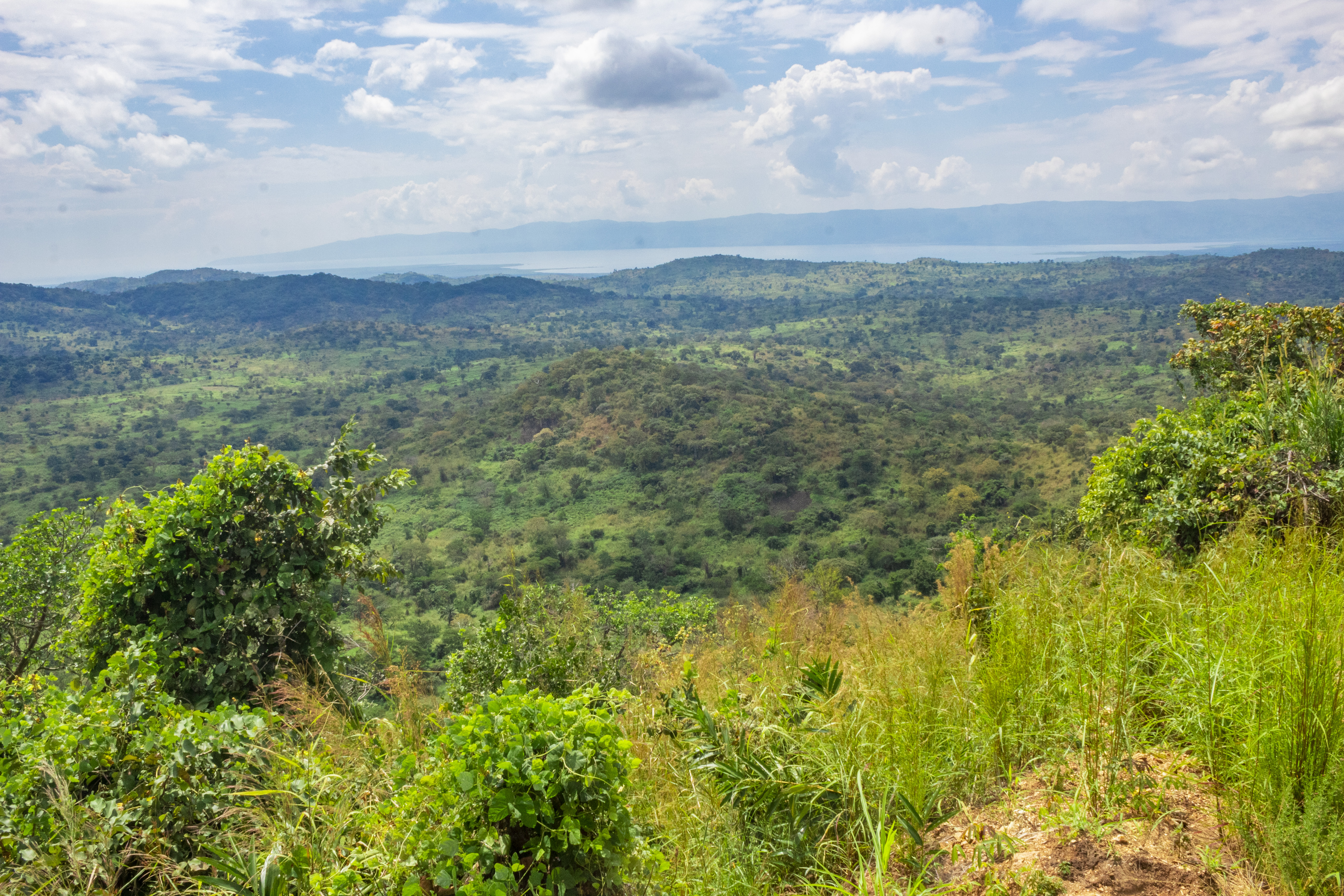
A panoramic view of Fizi Territory near Sebele in the foreground, with the expansive Lake Tanganyika and the Ubwari Peninsula visible in the background.

This also confirmed that Bembe migration followed the north–south Bantu route, not an east–west movement, and that their ancestry is shared with neighboring Lega and other Bantu-speaking peoples. Since the east of Fizi-Itombwe borders Lake Tanganyika, it would be illogical to view the Babembe as migrants "from the East", especially given their traditional mountain-dwelling, agricultural, and hunting-based way of life. Le Monde Colonial Illustré (No. 35, July 1926) described the Wabembe as a people of the "mountains and high plateaus of eastern Congo, who have preserved a more independent and fierce character". Similarly, Father Moinet (1881) observed: "The Wayova [Wazyoba, inhabitants along the Massanze coast], quickly became familiar with us, but the Wabembe still keep their distance. The latter form a formidable population living a little further west, in the mountains".

Claims that the Babembe were refugees displaced by the "Babingas", a group with no verified existence in Congolese ethnography, or that Fizi-Itombwe was uninhabited until the seventeenth century, are unfounded. Such theories, advanced by Willemart and later echoed by Moeller, were contradicted by earlier missionary and explorer reports. Father Henri Delaunay, one of the founders of the Catholic Mission of Lweba, described Ubembe as "a very populous and very fertile land". Likewise, J. B. Eyriès and Malte-Brun enumerated Ubembe's neighboring populations: the Wawira (Wavira), the Wasenze (Wamassanze, inhabitants of the highlands west of the Wabembe), the Wagoma to the south, and further on, the Waguhha (probably Wabuyu), Wat'hembye (likely Watembo), and Wukatete or Wakadete (likely Wanyindu). Missionary correspondence from 25 November 1880, five years before the Berlin Conference, records that the fathers traveling from Urundi reached Massanze, separated from Ubembe by a chain of hills. A report in La Croix (17 July 1887) placed Ubembe "to the west, from Kuyala up to the heights of Ouzighé [likely Ruzizi Plain]", describing the region as stretching "over a length of at least one hundred and fifty kilometers, running along the lake with a chain of high mountains". Other additional details on Ubembe's boundaries, stated that Ubembe was situated between "the coal basin of the Lukuga (Albertville, Mugandja massif)" and the "crystalline zone of Kivu-Tanganyika".

=== Social structure and colonial partition ===
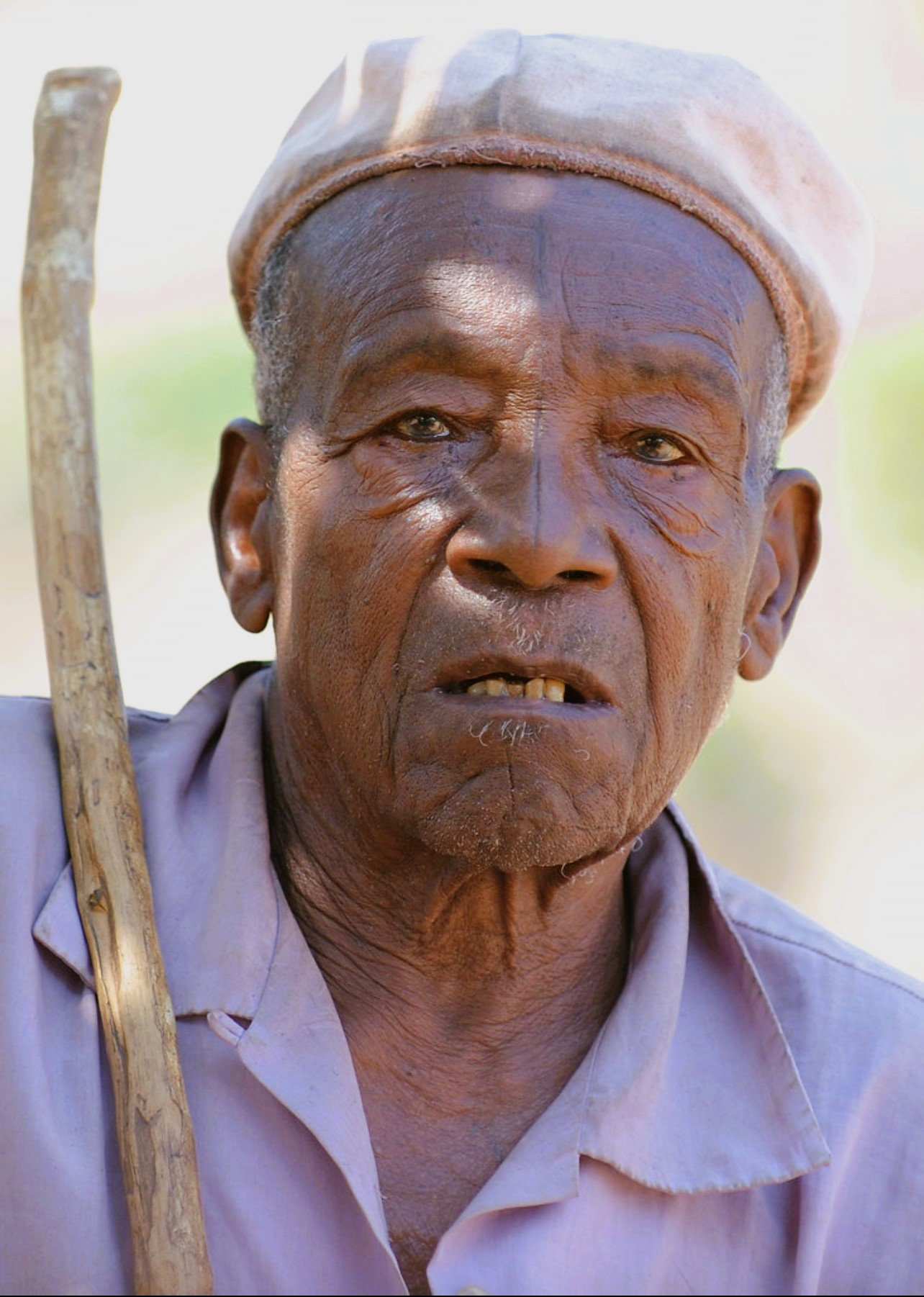
An elderly Bembe man from Fizi Territory

According to Father Isaac Moinet, the Babembe were a "formidable, energetic, and tenacious population". Their unity and strength, however, became a source of anxiety for colonial authorities. Ubembe persisted until 1899, when the Congo Free State (État Indépendant du Congo, EIC) established what would later be known as the Kalembelembe post. In 1900, an administrator named Foebel officially founded the Kalembelembe post in the Ngandja Sector, which became the first permanent administrative station in the region. Oral traditions recount that the name Kalembelembe originated from a distortion of a term in the Bembe language. The Belgians are said to have attributed this name to the village of Elekya (Kilicha). At the time, Kilicha was under the rule of Mlela Ebu'ela, known by his title Changuvu, a prominent ally of the Dhanis Column revolts. After killing two Belgian envoys sent to negotiate peace, Mlela (Changuvu) refused to attend the meeting convened by the Force Publique. Unbeknownst to him, his brother M'banduci, known as Sawasawa, chose to attend in his place, seeking reconciliation since the Babembe had endured wars and near-extinction since 1820. During the encounter, Sawasawa surrendered the weapons abandoned by the mutineers and declared, "Tunapenda Kalembe" ("We love peace"). From this declaration, the term Kalembelembe, signifying "abundant peace", was born.

By 1908, the colonial administration formally recognized and appointed several local chiefs: Kalembelembe (of the Ashilu clan), Ngalula and Ilinda (both of the Bungwe clan), Yambayamba (Tombwe clan), Kasangala (Basikasingo clan), Penge (Mnyaka clan), and Yahonda (Membé clan). In 1909, additional chiefs were appointed, including Mukuku (M'mindje clan), Sibacwa (Lala clan), Mboko (Bungwe clan), Mwezi (M'muma clan), Lisasi (Mnyaka clan), and 'Abonga (M'mindje clan). The Eloco chiefdom (chefferie) was also transferred from the Kalembelembe Sector to Baraka. According to Congolese historian Philbert Bilombele Asukulu, on 5 October 1910, Kalembelembe was subdivided into twenty-one chiefdoms: Babuyu, Kabalaka, Kabonga, Kilenge, Kilozo, Kisaoko, Lisase, Lukandamiza, Mwenelubanda, Mangilwa, Milingita, Mulamba, Mshingelwa, Mkuku, Mvano (Unano), Mwezi, Nundu, Pole, Shibatchwa, Sumahili, and Tembele. Around this period, monetary circulation was introduced in the region. Chief Esale and the Basi'm'mindje community subsequently migrated from the Mutambala Valley (in the Msambya area), where they had resided since the Bingya wars, to the interior highlands of Itombwe.

On 15 April 1926, a decree was issued stipulating that territorial entities of the Belgian Congo were to bear the names of their predominant ethnic groups. Consequently, the Kalembelembe Territory, literally meaning "Abundant Peace", was redesignated as the Territory of the Babembe on 1 October 1926. The administrative center retained the name Kalembelembe until the decree of 5 February 1935 officially renamed it Fizi Territory. In 1937, Fizi Territory was subdivided into five sectors: Itombwe, Lulenge, Mutambala, Ngandja, and Tanganyika. Present-day Ubembe encompasses two administrative entities: the Fizi Territory and the Itombwe Sector, the latter having been incorporated into Mwenga Territory on 31 December 1947. The annexation of Itombwe to Mwenga Territory occurred without the consent of the Babembe population, who sought to preserve their unity. Instead, they were divided; some aligned administratively with the Lega in Mwenga Territory, and others with Zoba in Fizi Territory. This division engendered irredentist sentiments among the Babembe, whose aspiration for reunification persisted long after colonial restructuring.

Ubembe's mountainous landscapes, interspersed with fertile valleys, allowed for a mixed economy of agriculture, hunting, and trade. The Babembe developed a reputation as proud mountaineers, fiercely protective of their autonomy.

== History ==
According to genealogical accounts preserved by traditional griots, the Babembe trace their origins to a common ancestor named Mbondo (M'mbondo). The Babembe are believed to have lived alongside the Barega (Balega or Ulega) from the northeast before moving into the Itombwe region, where they later separated. Leka (the brother of Mbondo) returned to the Ulega area and became the progenitor of the Balega people of today, while M'mbondo became the ancestor of the Babembe, whose descendants remained in the Itombwe area and later continued their migration toward Lake Tanganyika. Bangu, the brother of Leka, is said to have settled in Maniema, giving rise to the Bangubangu lineage. According to Alfred Moeller de Laddersous and Van Bulck, as referenced by Benoît Verhaegen, the Babembe designate the peoples living to the east of Lulenge, particularly in Fizi Territory and the Itombwe sector in Mwenga Territory. They describe the Babembe as a mountain people who gradually moved downward, displacing surrounding populations along the Lake Tanganyika shoreline, particularly the Sanza and Bwari fishermen. The Babembe are ethnically related to the Barega and form the southernmost extension of this group. In Fizi Territory, they constitute the majority demographic group.

=== Arab-Swahili slave trade ===
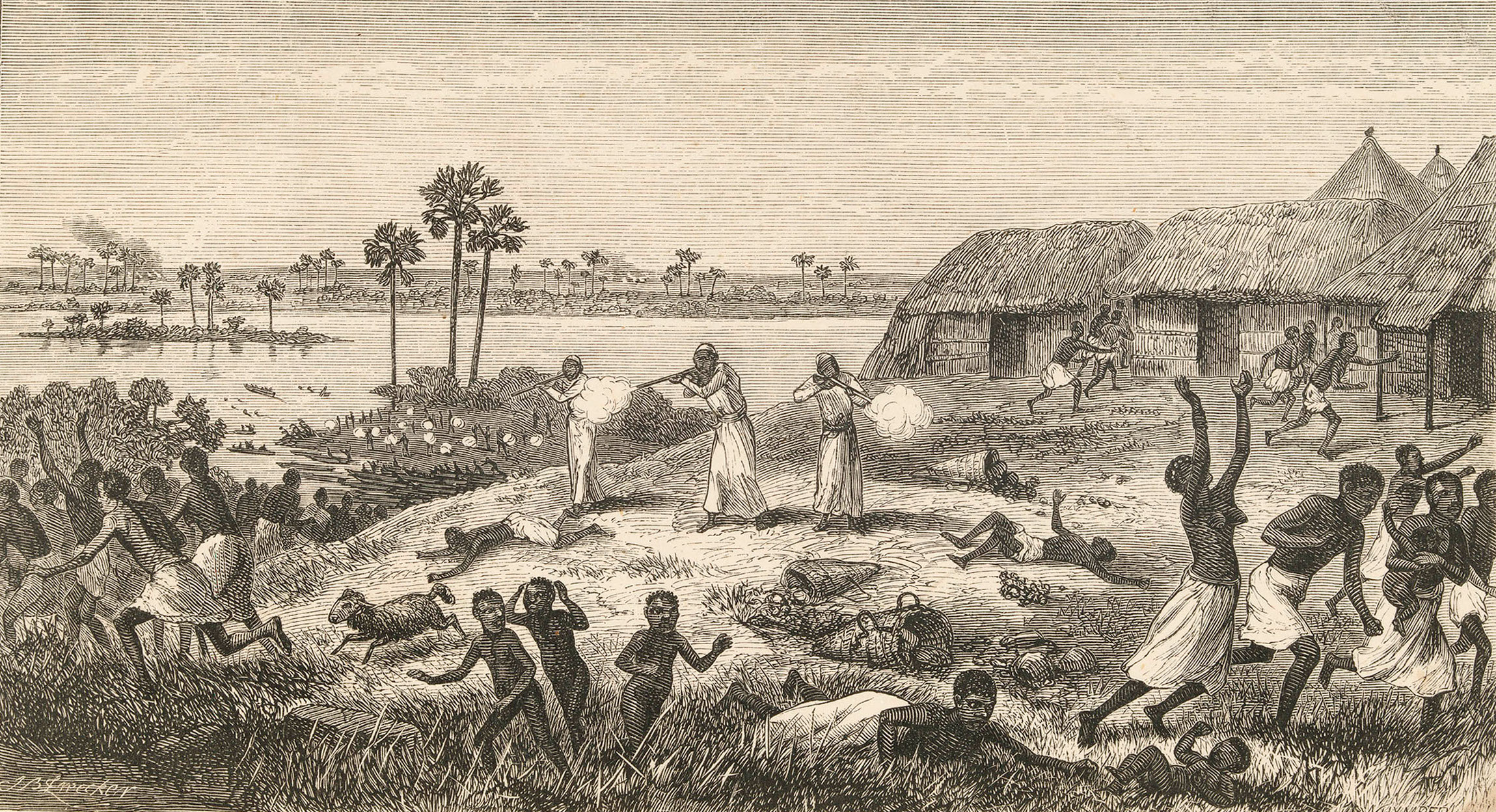
Three men of Dugumbé ben Habib raiding the market of Nyangwe on 15 July 1871

Throughout the 19th century, Ubembe was ravaged by slave raids carried out by Arab-Swahili traders. European explorers and missionaries recorded eyewitness accounts of these events, many of which survive in their writings. Father Isaac Moinet, a French missionary from the Society of Missionaries of Africa (commonly known as the Pères Blancs or White Fathers), described in his Missionary Journal how, on 30 January 1881, two boats full of armed captives passed before "Moulonewa" (M'lweba or Mulweba), led by an Arab-Swahili from Ujiji named Mwinyi Waziri. The raiders were seeking revenge for a trader allegedly killed and eaten in Ubembe. Their campaign resulted in the destruction of numerous villages and the enslavement of their residents. Moinet lamented Europe's inaction, arguing that the abolition of the coastal slave trade was meaningless without firm efforts to curb inland trafficking. He feared for the safety of missionaries and local converts, observing that peace could not prevail as long as Arab-Swahili traders remained unchecked.

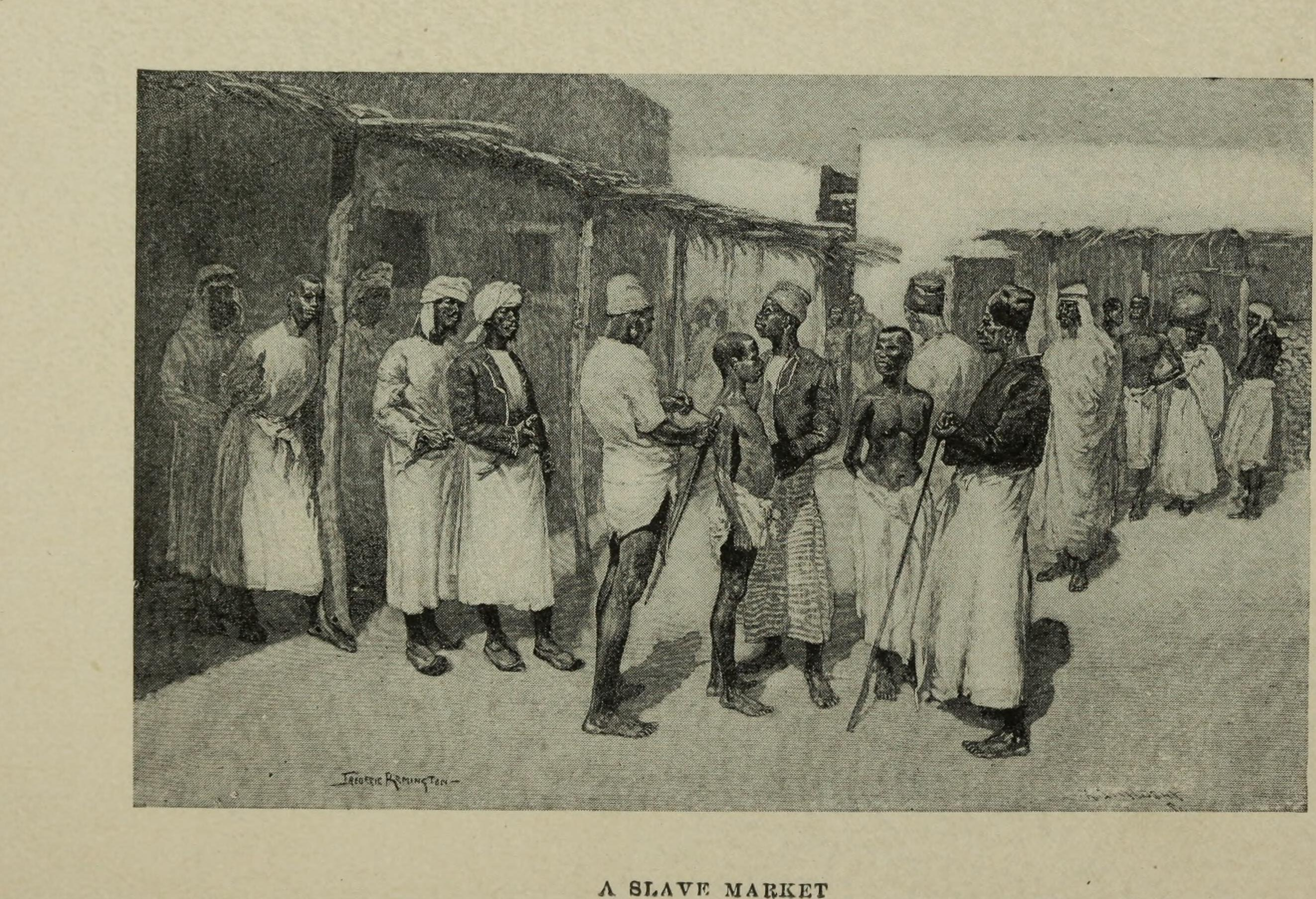
A 19th-century image showing an Arab-Swahili slave market, a typical scene in East and Central Africa during the height of the 19th-century slave trade. Slave raiders, often operating from bases in Ujiji, Unyanyembe, and Maniema, pushed deep into the Congo Basin, capturing men, women, and children to be sold along trade routes stretching to the Indian Ocean.

Similarly, Father Théophile Dromaux wrote to the Holy See on 6 November 1891, denouncing the Wanguana slave hunters, who plundered Ubembe's lands and left behind only "desolation and death". Historian Stephen J. Rockel explains that the Wanguana, Waungwana, or "gentlemen", a minority of caravan laborers and residents of market towns, were either slaves or freedmen associated with Muslim traders. Although most were based along the coast, many journeyed deep into the African interior for extended periods. They adopted Swahili Muslim customs while retaining diverse East African origins. Through mobility, wage labor, and entrepreneurship, the Wanguana gained a measure of independence, becoming cultural intermediaries and founders of emerging caravan towns. In June 1883, Moinet founded the Kibanga Mission, moving his growing Christian community from Mulweba fertile lands granted by a local chief named Pore. There, he developed farms, built an orphanage, and established a catechism school, performing the first adult baptisms on Christmas Eve that same year. By 1885, under the directive of Cardinal Lavigerie, the White Fathers took over the Mpala post from the International African Association (Association Internationale Africaine; AIA), and Moinet assumed leadership on 26 July. Under his supervision, Mpala evolved into a major spiritual and administrative hub that combined Christian instruction, local governance, and campaigns against slavery. Moinet emerged as one of the fiercest critics of the Arab-Swahili slave system. In a letter written from Kibanga on 2 April 1892, Moinet expressed his concern about the expansion of the Arab-Swahili slave trade and the fate of the Bembe. He noted:

"I fear that we may soon be forced to abandon Kibanga. Besides the terrifying mortality, the surrounding region [Ubembe] has been devastated by the men of Romaliza [Rumaliza]. There is no longer a single inhabitant here except for our catechumens, who number nearly 2,000. Ubwari is a desert, and in the past six months alone, the number of Wabembe who have been killed, died of hunger, or taken as slaves rises, without exaggeration, to more than 10,000".

Moinet frequently risked his life rescuing enslaved children, caring for the sick, and mediating between local chiefs and Arab-Swahili merchants. In 1885, he organized smallpox vaccinations for more than 300 people, as the period was also marked by widespread epidemics of smallpox, leprosy, sleeping sickness, and venereal diseases, with the locals associating these calamities with the arrival of Arab-Swahili traders, whether justly or not. Oral histories recount that these illnesses caused even greater suffering than the slave raids themselves. According to Daniel P. Biebuyck, numerous ethnic groups, including the Babuyu, Basanze, Babwari, Banyindu, Bazoba, Bagoma, Bakalangwa, Bakeci, and Basikamanya, were severely reduced or displaced by the combined effects of slave raids, disease, and interethnic conflict, while others, such as the Bembe and Luba, maintained settlements in coastal villages and adjacent inland zones.

== Cultural traditions ==
A semi-nomadic people, who often settled in forest environments. The women cultivated the crops and the men hunted, fished and other entrepreneurship business.

=== Music ===
The babembe people traditionally play drums in their folk music. The way the drum is played can be called a six-beat tune. The music is played in celebration of any sort. The music is accompanied by the folk dance. The dance utilizes movements of the shoulder and waist. It is referred to as Esuba. Folk music has also been adapted into more modernise genres.

=== Cuisine ===
Babembe cuisine consists of cassava-based foods and fish. The fish they love to eat the most are Mkeke or Mkebuka and Dagaa (a very small fish). Cassava can come in the form of Kyenge and eswaka all similar to fufu. Wabembe are especially fond of eating Kyenge. Vegetable-based foods range from sombe (a stew of pounded cassava lived preferably with ground up nuts and palm oil) and mlonda.
