= Fizi Territory =

Fizi Wilaya ya Fizi Alembe lembe
- Territory
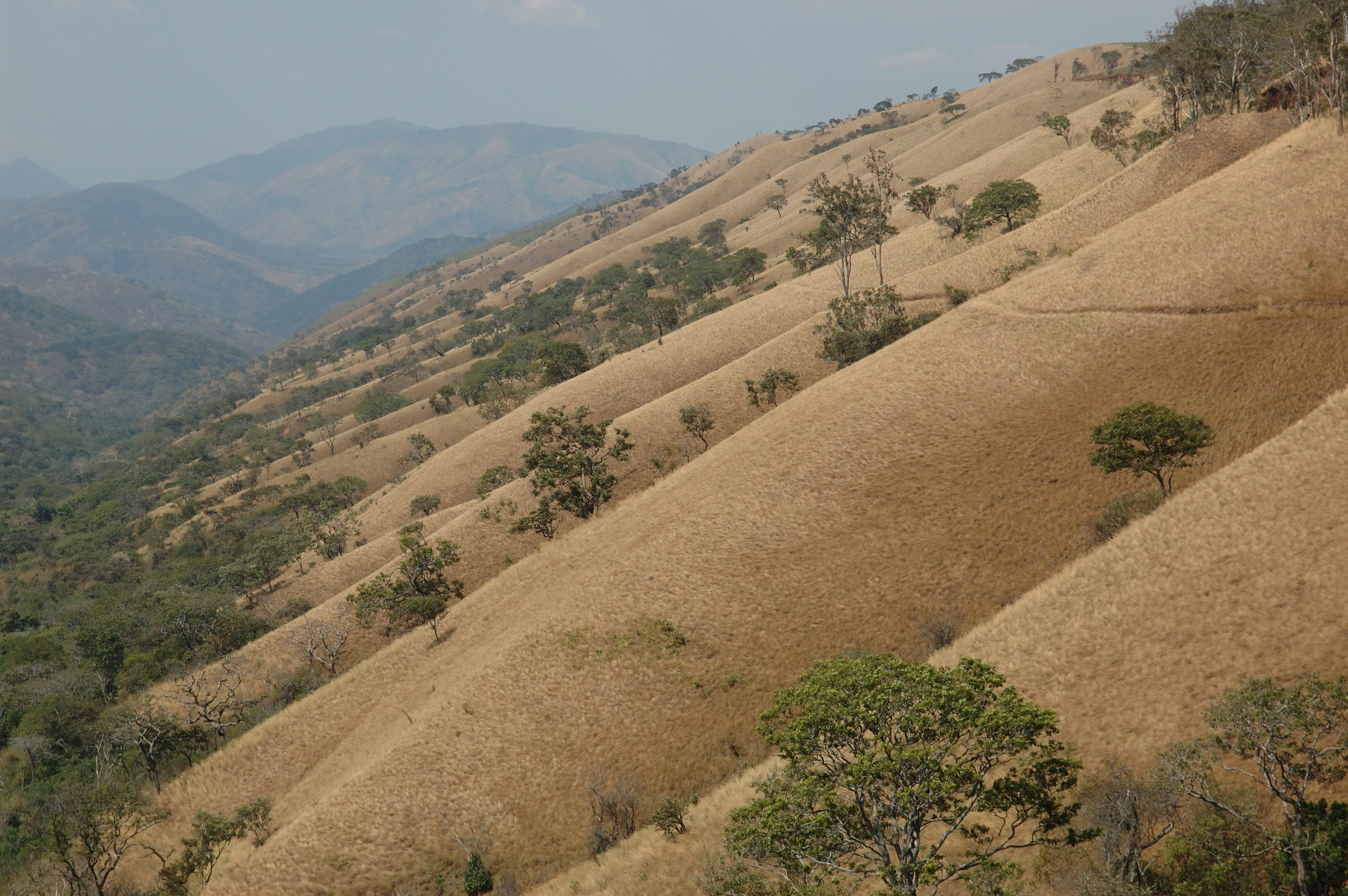
- Fizi Territory, South Kivu
- Fizi territory within South Kivu
- Location in Democratic Republic of the Congo
- Coordinates: 4°18′4″S 28°56′39″E
- Country: Democratic Republic of the Congo
- Province: Sud-Kivu

Government
  - Territory Administrator: Samy Kalonji

Area
  - Total: 41,745 km^{2} (16,118 sq mi)

Population
  - Total: 1,000,674
- Time zone: UTC+2 (CAT)
- National language: Swahili
- Climate: Aw

Fizi is a territory in the south of Sud-Kivu Province, Democratic Republic of the Congo, bordering the South Kivu territories of Uvira, Mwenga and Shabunda to the north, Lake Tanganyika or Tanzania in the east, and the provinces Tanganyika in the south and Maniema in the west.

The predominant language in the territory is Bembe and Kiswahili.

== Geography ==
Fizi territory is located in the south of the South Kivu province, on the shore of Lake Tanganyika, borderline with Tanzania's Kigoma Region.

=== Administrative division ===
Collectivities within the Fizi territory include

- N'Gangya
- Lùlenge
- M'tambala
- Tangani'a
- Itombwe

=== Towns ===
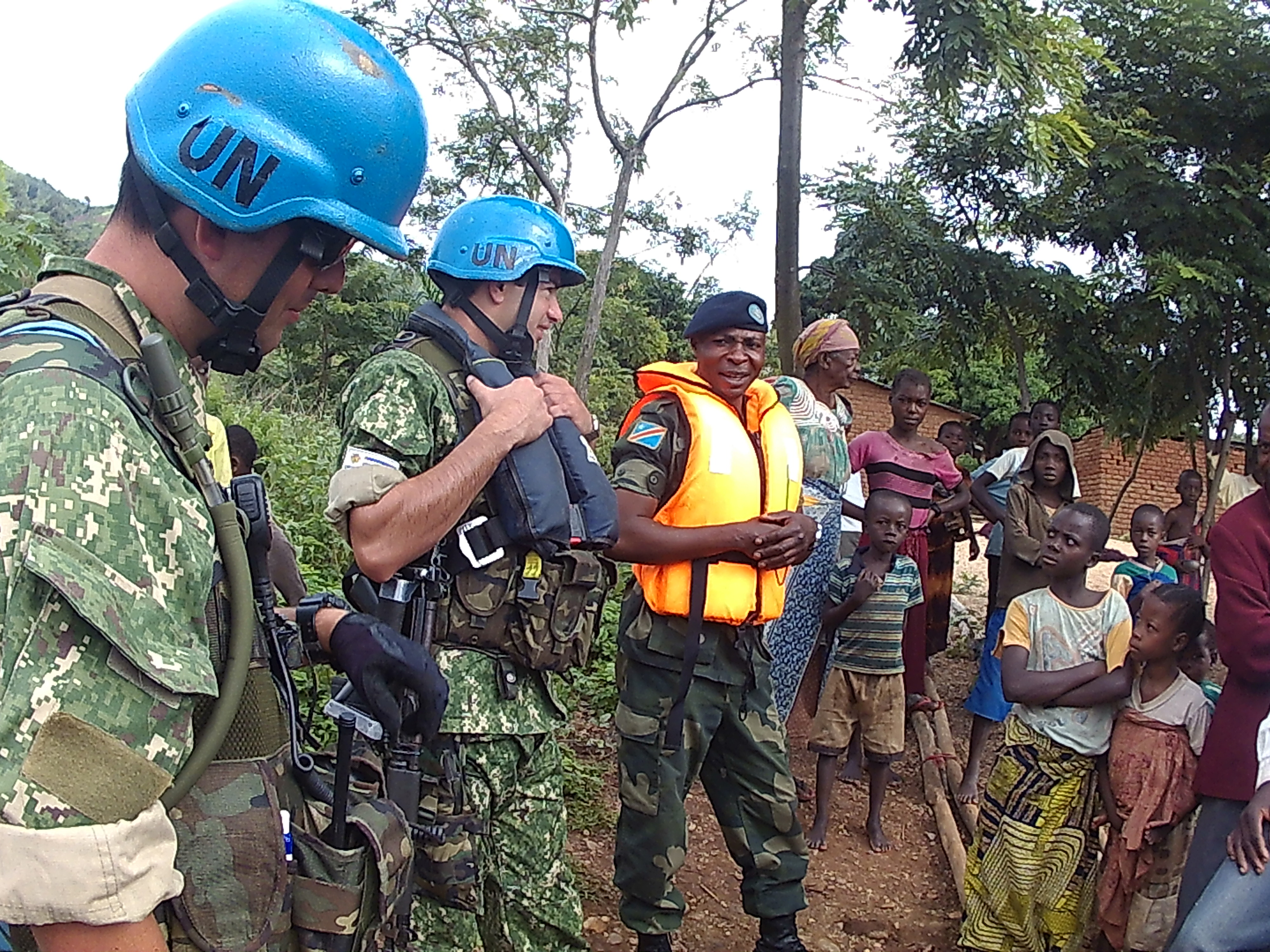
MONUSCO peacekeepers and a FARDC Navy sailor in a village of the Fizi Territory

The administrative center (chef-lieu) of the territory is referred to as Fizi Centre, but Baraka (bala'a) is considered the main town of the territory because of its semi-urbanized advancements. Baraka is composed of three communities (Baraka, Katanga and Kalundja). In 1892, it became the first entity in the urban model in the province of South Kivu.

Some villages of Fizi are: Makobola, Kahama, Aseeci, Kwa Munene, Ilakala, Swema, Ake I, Ake II, Abeka, Mukwezi, Musenya, Atongo, Abûmbe, Ilela, Mgûle, Abondoki, 'wa Mboko, Lûûkyû, Mkangyaolo, 'wa Núndú, Bashiwaenge, Bashimweci, 'Yonwe, Zimbwe, Lusambo, Atûngulû, Atondo, Losenda, Lulinda, Elemyonga, Mkolwe, Bûkû, Bitobolo, Lûbûmba, Atete, Lweba, Andale, Ekwena, Abela, Alûnja, Lo'oe, Matongo, Mwemezi, Bomani (Baraka centre), Ebonjwa, Mwansombo, Mwambango, Mongemonge, Mwatembo, Akyûngwe, Akomba, Atanga. Upon reaching Atanga, there is a junction, at which turning left leads to Fizi and the open side of the Lake Tanganyika shore. Malinde is a junction village. Towns after turning left include Malinde, Mlongwe, Atalûkûlû, Isee, Sebele. There is another junction in Sebele village. The right road leads to Eonde and then Kazimia village. The left road heads to Nemba, Msombozi, Kisokwe, Manga, Rasi, Mizimu, Kalongwe, Dine, Ibwe la nyookye, Kahongo, Equateur, Bandundu, Bas Zaire, Lubomo, Lwambama, Mwayenga, Kalila, Bwenge, Lubilo, Hona, Mwajalûlû, Bûma, Alamba, Kilumû, Kazimia.

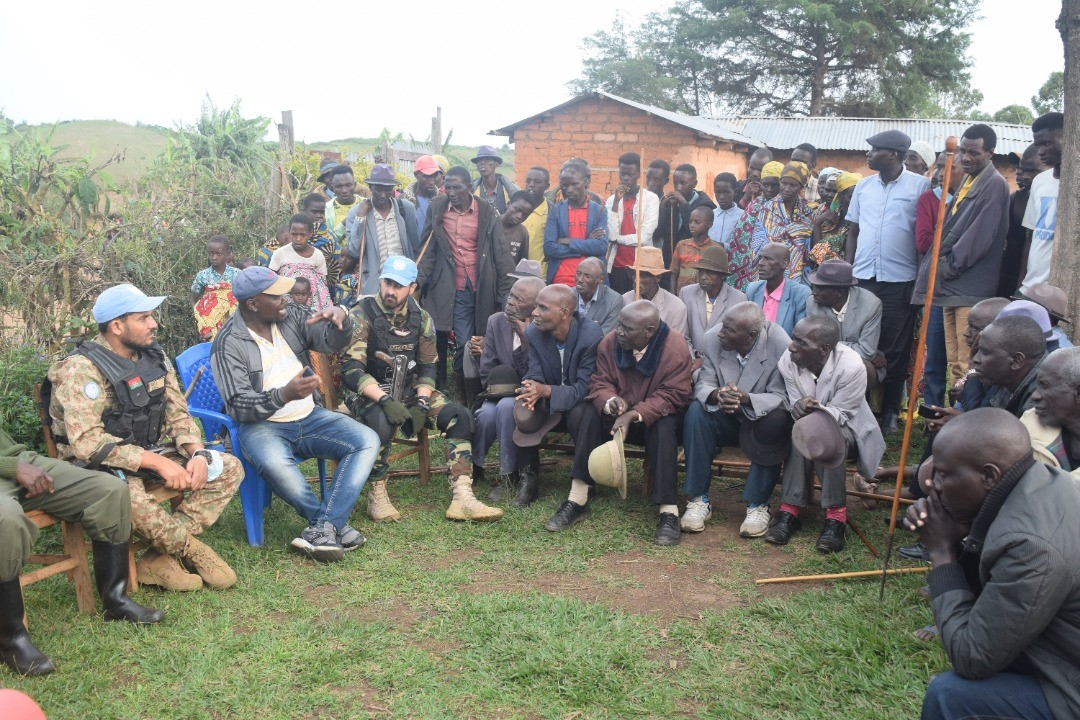
Bibokoboko - Locals meet MONUSCO troops from Pakistan in 2022

There is no road access between Nemba to Kazimia; people use boats for transportation because most villages are built on shore and between mountains. Kazimia, Abumbwe, Nguma, Ekyoci, Lûandaki, Atuma, Ebamba, Ehingeci, Asaba, Msamba, Yungu, Esanu, Sele, Akone, Mkongwe, Mande, Talama and the river Alela is the border of Fizi and Shaba or Sud-Kivu province and Shaba Province. If you jump the mountains of Fizi, you will find several villages there: Maganja, Bibokoboko, Minembwe, Kanguli, Wangulube, Mkera. The main mining cities of Fizi are Misèsè and Mkera.

== History ==
The region has a long history of independence from Kinshasa. It was the location of the maquis set up by Laurent-Désiré Kabila in 1967, as well as the place where Laurent-Désiré Kabila raised his son, the former president Joseph Kabila, in 1973. Throughout much of the Second Congo War, the town was contested by numerous armed groups.

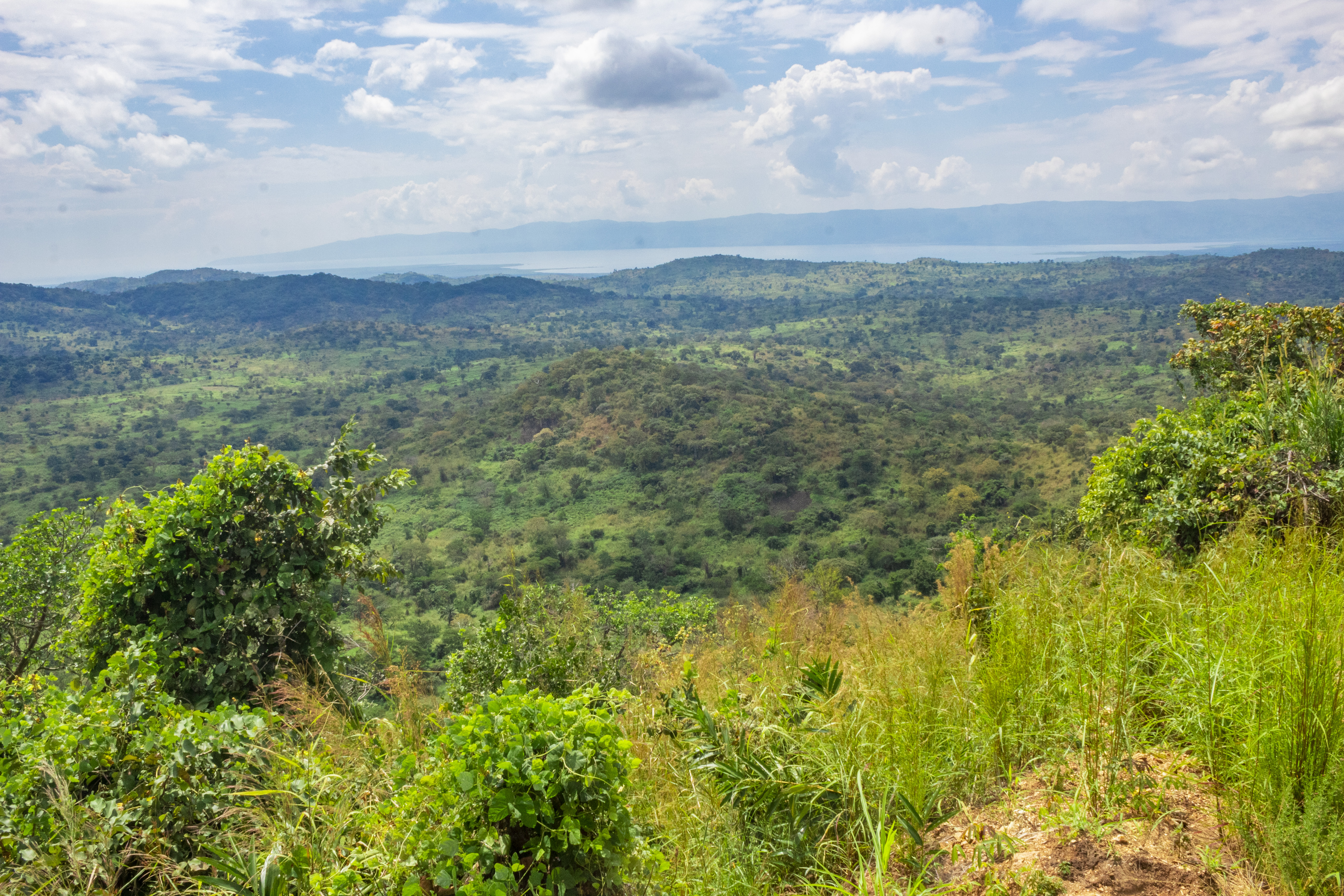
The landscape of Fizi near Sebele (Foreground) with lake Tanganyika and the Ubwari peninsula seen in the background

== Politics ==
Fizi territory is represented in the 2024-29 National Assembly by four deputies:

- Théophile Basoshi Iubwe (A/A-UNC)
- Janvier Msenyibwa Apele (2A/TDC), replacing Jean-Jacques Myewa Elakano
- Obedi Nyamangyoku Ishibwela (AFDC-A)
- Th Tchakubuta Mufaume (AAAP)
