= Kabwari language =

Bantu language spoken in DR Congo

Bwari
- Kabwari
- Native to: Democratic Republic of Congo
- Region: South Kivu
- Native speakers: 8,400 (2002)
- Language family: Niger–Congo?: Atlantic–Congo; Benue–Congo; Bantoid; Bantu; Northeast Bantu; Great Lakes Bantu; Bwari

Language codes
- ISO 639-3: kcw
- Glottolog: kabw1242
- Guthrie code: JD.56

Bwari, or Kabwari, is a minor Bantu language of the Democratic Republic of the Congo.
