= Bembe language (Ibembe) =

Bantu language spoken in DR Congo and Tanzania

Bembe
- Kibembe
- Native to: DR Congo, Tanzania
- Region: Lake Tanganyika
- Ethnicity: Bembe people
- Native speakers: (250,000 in DRC cited 1991)
- Language family: Niger–Congo?: Atlantic–Congo; Benue–Congo; Southern Bantoid; Bantu (Zone D, formerly D.50); Lega–Binja; Lega–Bemba; Bembe

Language codes
- ISO 639-3: bmb
- Glottolog: bemb1255
- Guthrie code: D.54

Bembe (Kibembe or Ebembe) is a Bantu language of the Democratic Republic of the Congo and Western Tanzania. According to Ethnologue, it forms a dialect continuum with the Lega language through Mwenga Lega.
