= Tanganyika, Fizi Territory =

Sector in Fizi Territory, South Kivu

Tanganyika Tangani'a
- Sector
- Secteur de Tanganyika
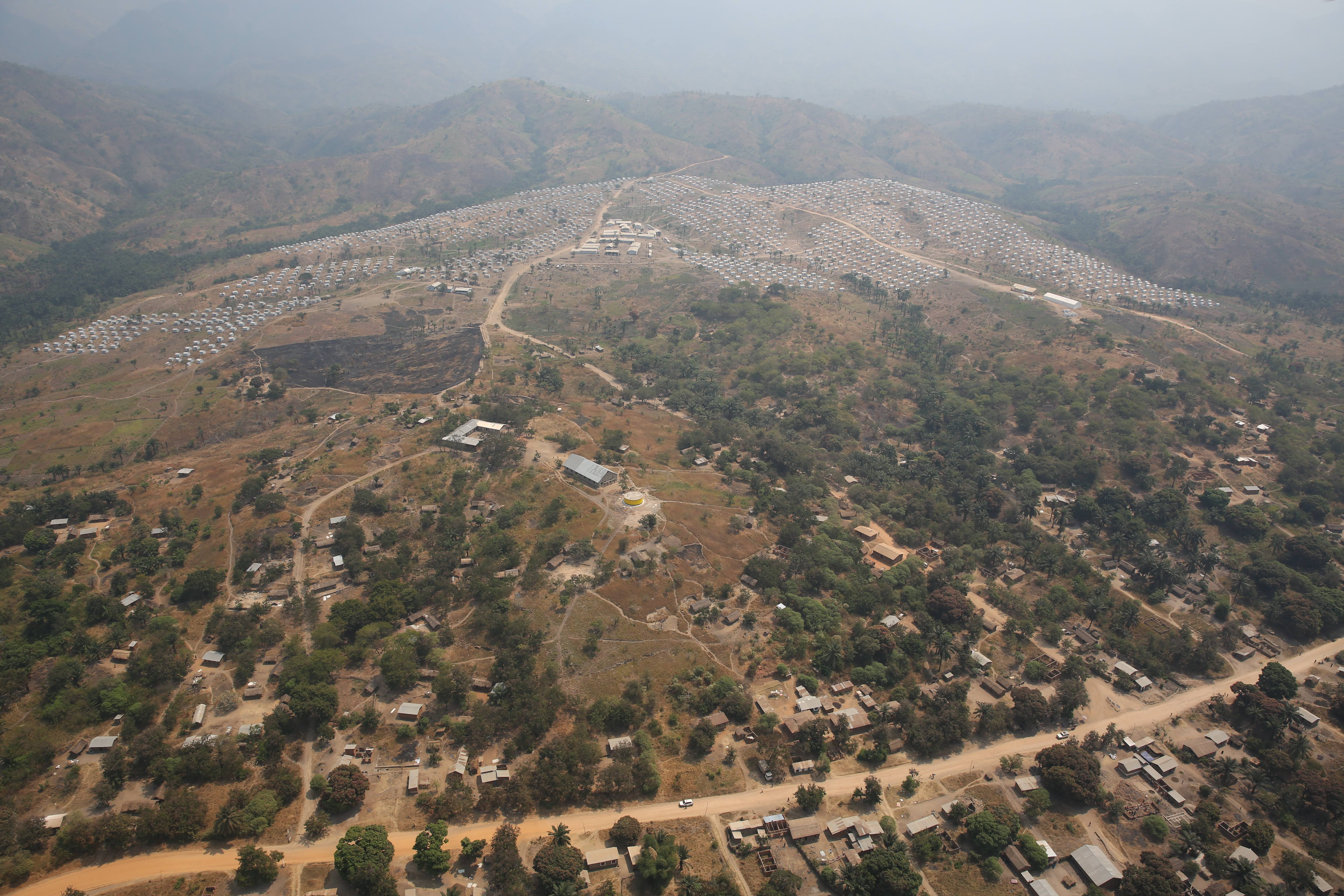
- Aerial view of Lusenda Refugee Camp
- Country: Democratic Republic of the Congo
- Province: South Kivu
- Territory: Fizi
- Capital: Mboko

Government
  - Chef de secteur: John Mulondani

Area
  - Total: 2,100 km^{2} (810 sq mi)

Population (2014)
  - Total: 284,916
- Time zone: UTC+2 (CAT)

Tanganyika is one of the four sectors of Fizi Territory in the South Kivu province, located in the eastern region of the Democratic Republic of the Congo. Spanning approximately 2,100 square kilometers, it ranks as the third-largest sector in the territory, following Lulenge. The sector derives its name from Lake Tanganyika, which borders it to the east and forms a natural boundary with Burundi. The name "Tanganyika" is rendered Tangani'a in Kibembe.

Tanganyika occupies the northeastern extremity of Fizi Territory. It is bordered to the north by the Ambaulu River, separating it from the Bavira Chiefdom in Uvira Territory; to the southeast by the Lweba River, which divides it from Mutambala; and to the southwest by Lulenge and Itombwe of neighboring Mwenga Territory. As of 2014, the sector had an estimated population of 284,916. It is administratively subdivided into five groupements: Babungwe-Nord, Balala-Nord, Basimukuma-Nord, Basilotcha, and Basimunyaka-Nord. The sector is predominantly inhabited by Babembe, who are indigenous to the area and constitute the majority population in the plains and middle plateaus. Other indigenous communities include the Bazoba, alongside smaller populations of Bafuliiru, Bashi, Barega, Banyamulenge, Banyidu, and Barundi. The local economy is primarily based on agriculture and livestock farming.

Tanganyika has been profoundly affected by the First and Second Congo Wars, which significantly disrupted the region and gave rise to ongoing insecurity characterized by armed conflict and localized violence.

== Geography ==
=== Terrain and climate ===
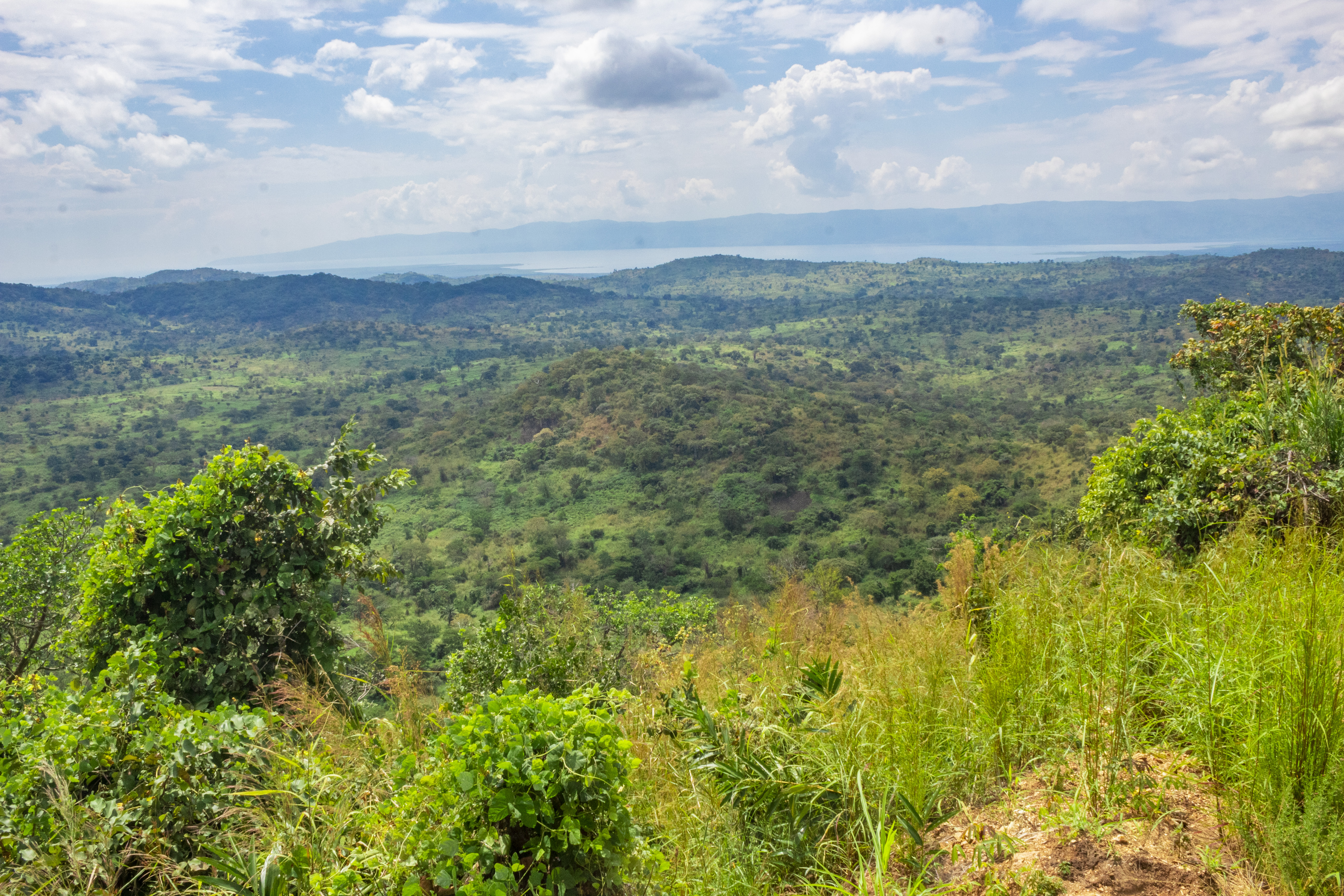
A panoramic view of Fizi Territory near Sebele in the foreground, with the expansive Lake Tanganyika and the Ubwari Peninsula visible in the background.

Tanganyika is characterized by a varied topography that includes a narrow coastal plain along Lake Tanganyika and a series of high-altitude mountainous zones forming part of the Mitumba Mountain range, where elevations can reach up to 3,000 meters. The eastern part of the sector, along the lake shore, consists of a tropical coastal plain dominated by grassy savannah with scattered shrubs. This lowland area features sandy soils and a warm, humid climate conducive to the cultivation of subsistence and commercial crops such as bananas. In contrast, the western highlands are more forested and feature clayey and alluvial soils, supporting crops like maize and beans.

Lake Tanganyika, the world's second-largest freshwater lake and the second deepest in the world, forms the entire eastern boundary of the sector. It serves as a critical source of fish and plays an important role in regulating the local climate. In addition to the lake, the sector is irrigated by several rivers, including the Ambaulu, Mutambala, Ngovi, Ambumbegi, Lweba, Sangya, Lusenda, Abembwe, Tingitingi, and Lubambo. These waterways contribute to the sector's freshwater resources, though many of the natural springs remain undeveloped and underutilized for domestic and agricultural use.

The climate is influenced by its proximity to Lake Tanganyika. The eastern region experiences a tropical climate, while the mountainous west has a more humid climate. Average annual temperatures range between 21 °C and 24.5 °C, with peaks of 30 °C to 32 °C during the dry season. The area experiences a bimodal climate, with a rainy season lasting from October to April and a dry season from May to September. Annual precipitation typically ranges from 900 mm to 1,200 mm, supporting both agriculture and biodiversity across the sector.

=== Governance and administrative divisions ===
Tanganyika is administered through a decentralized system of local governance that combines traditional leadership structures with formal political institutions. The sector is headed by a traditional authority known as the Mwami (Chief), officially referred to as the Chef de secteur (Sector Head), who is vested with authority by the provincial government of South Kivu.

- The governance of the sector is organized around two primary institutions: the Sector Council (Conseil de secteur) and the Sector Executive College (Collège exécutif du secteur). The Sector Council functions as the deliberative body and is composed of councilors elected through universal, direct, and secret suffrage in accordance with national electoral laws. This council is responsible for discussing and deciding on issues of local interest and for electing both the Sector Head and Deputy Sector Head (Chef de secteur adjoint). Once elected, these officials are formally invested by the Provincial Governor, with investiture becoming automatic if not granted within fifteen days. The council operates under the leadership of a bureau made up of a President, vice-president, and Rapporteur, elected according to internal regulations, with efforts made to ensure gender representation.
- The Sector Executive College serves as the executive arm of the sector's administration. It includes the Sector Head, Deputy Sector Head, and two Aldermen, who are appointed by the Sector Head and approved by the council. Selection is based on merit, credibility, and representativeness of the local communities. The Deputy Sector Head assists with administration and acts in place of the Sector Head when necessary, while the Aldermen carry out executive duties as assigned by decree.
- The Sector Head is the principal administrative authority in Tanganyika, with broad responsibilities that include implementing national and provincial laws, maintaining civil records, managing sector finances and budgets, authorizing tax collection, and representing the sector in legal and administrative matters. As the head of local regulatory enforcement, the Sector Head also coordinates with national police to maintain public order and security.

For purposes of local administration and service delivery, Tanganyika is subdivided into groupements (groupings), each governed by a Chef de groupement (Group Leader). These groupements serve as intermediary administrative units and are further divided into localités (villages), each led by a Chef de localité or Chef de village.

No.	Groupements	Ref.
1.	Babungwe-Nord	
2.	Balala-Nord	
3.	Basimukuma-Nord	
4.	Basimunyaka-Nord	
5.	Basilotcha	

== History ==
Tanganyika's history is closely linked to the broader ethnogenesis and settlement patterns within Fizi Territory, which is predominantly inhabited by Babembe. According to oral tradition preserved by Bembe griots, the Babembe trace their origins to a common ancestor named Mbondo (or M'mbondo), who is believed to have migrated with the Barega (Balega) from the northeast through Urega before reaching the Itombwe Mountains. There, the groups reportedly separated: Mbondo's descendants, the Babembe, migrated toward Lake Tanganyika, while his brother Leka returned to Ulega, becoming the progenitor of the Barega. A third sibling, Bangu, is said to have settled in Maniema and founded the Bangubangu ethnic group.

Before the Babembe's expansion, the region was already home to various ethnic groups, including the Babuyu, Basanze, Babwari, Banyindu, Bazoba, Bagoma, Bakalangwa, Bakeci, Basikamanya and others. These communities were concentrated along the shores of Lake Tanganyika and the surrounding hinterlands. As early as 1881, small Rwandan Tutsi communities were documented in the Itombwe region, according to geographer George Weis. However, the most significant waves of Tutsi migration occurred between 1959 and 1974, driven by the Hutu Revolution and ethnic persecution in Rwanda. Many Tutsi refugees initially settled in localities such as Bwegera and Mulenge in Bafuliiru Chiefdom of Uvira Territory before dispersing to the highlands of Fizi Territory, including Tanganyika.

Additional waves of migration into the sector included the Bavira and Bafuliiru from neighboring Uvira Territory. These groups began settling in Fizi Territory around 1955 in search of fertile land and pasture. The Bavira established communities in areas such as Nemba, Sebelle (south of Baraka), and Kenya and Mboko (north of Baraka, within Tanganyika). The Bafuliiru settled across various localities where they practiced mixed livestock farming, often alongside Banyarwanda migrants. Another significant demographic development occurred in the aftermath of the 1972 ethnic massacres in Burundi, which led to the arrival of Barundi refugees, primarily Hutu. A local census in December 1972 recorded approximately 12,685 Barundi refugees residing in the Mutambala and Tanganyika sectors. However, the outbreak of the First Congo War and the Second Congo War severely destabilized the region, causing many Barundi refugees and their descendants to repatriate to Burundi or flee further to Tanzania.

=== Regional conflicts ===
Tanganyika has endured persistent security challenges, particularly during and after the Second Congo War (1998–2003), which plunged much of the eastern Democratic Republic of the Congo into sustained violence. The conflict began in August 1998, following the collapse of relations between President Laurent-Désiré Kabila and his former Rwandan and Ugandan allies, whom he accused of plotting a coup d'état and interfering in Congolese sovereignty. The rebellion, led by the Rassemblement Congolais pour la Démocratie (RCD) and backed militarily by Rwanda, Uganda, and Burundi, rapidly seized control of much of eastern Congo, including South Kivu Province. Tanganyika became a flashpoint of violence during this period. In October and November 1998, the villages of Swima and Lusambo witnessed brutal massacres, with 22 civilians killed during a market day. Soldiers from the RCD's armed wing, the Armée Nationale Congolaise (ANC), in coordination with the Rwandan Patriotic Army (RPA) and Burundian Armed Forces (FAB), accused local residents of supporting Mayi-Mayi local-defense militias and responded with indiscriminate violence, including shooting unarmed civilians. Retaliatory attacks escalated in December 1998, culminating on 21 December when nine civilians were executed in Mboko following military operations against Mayi-Mayi forces. Reports documented house-to-house searches and summary executions using both firearms and bladed weapons.

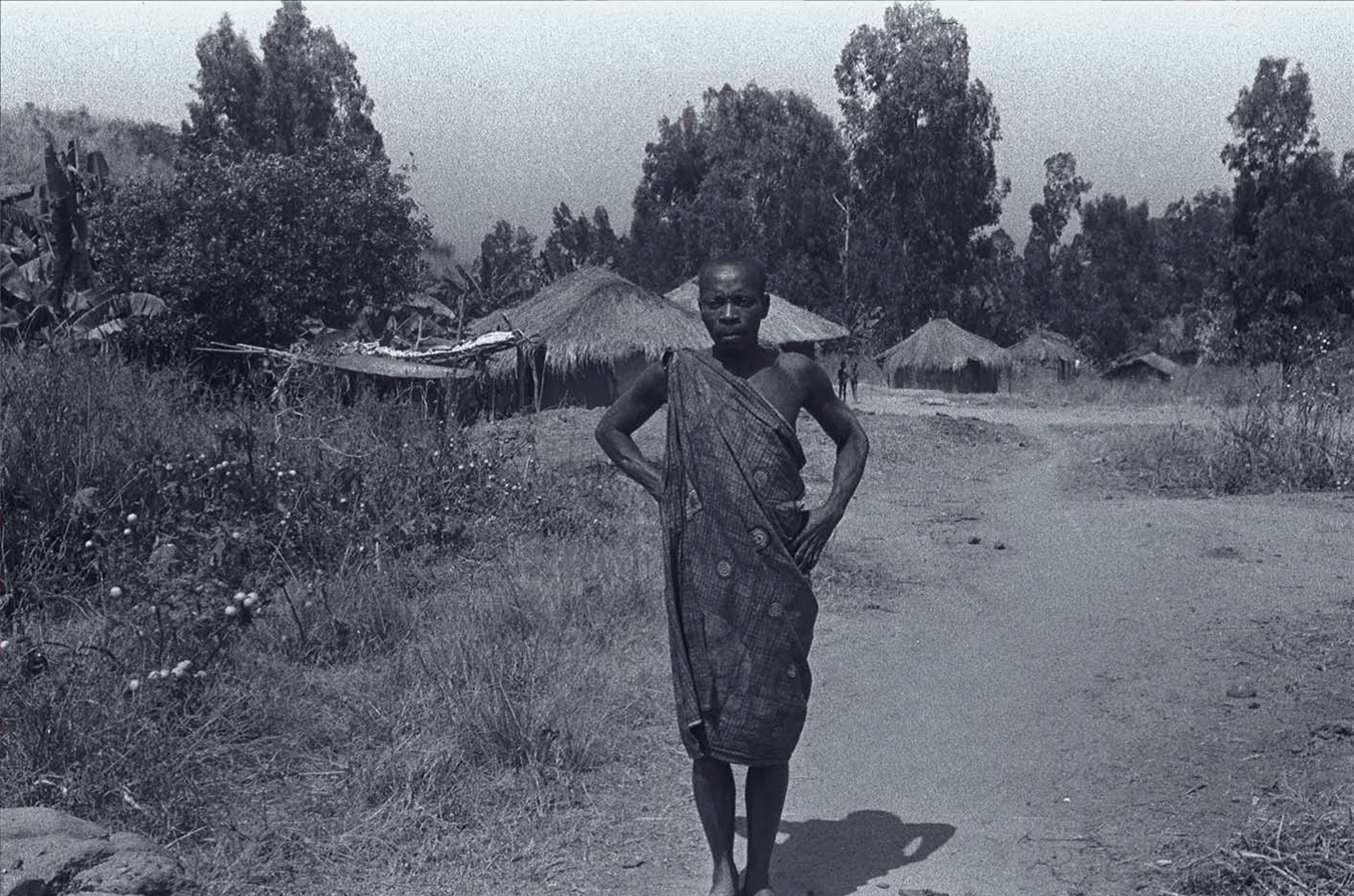
A view of Makobola village in 1954, before the massacre that would later occur there from 30 December 1998 to 2 January 1999

One of the most devastating incidents in the region occurred between 30 December 1998 and 2 January 1999, in what became known as the Makobola Massacre. Joint forces of the ANC, RPA, and FAB attacked a cluster of villages, including Makobola II, Bangwe, Katuta, Mikunga, and Kashekezi, killing more than 800 civilians.

The assassination of President Laurent-Désiré Kabila on 16 January 2001 marked a turning point in the national crisis. His son, Joseph Kabila, assumed the presidency and initiated a series of diplomatic efforts aimed at ending the conflict. The Inter-Congolese Dialogue (ICD), a comprehensive peace process involving government representatives, rebel factions, political opposition, and civil society, sought to lay the groundwork for national reconciliation. The Inter-Congolese Dialogue officially opened on 25 February 2002 in Sun City, South Africa. While a preliminary power-sharing agreement was reached on 19 April 2002 between President Joseph Kabila and rebel leader Jean-Pierre Bemba, the agreement faced resistance from RCD-Goma and prominent opposition factions, notably the Union for Democracy and Social Progress (UDPS). Nonetheless, a major breakthrough was achieved on 30 July 2002 when the DRC and Rwanda signed a peace accord in Pretoria. Rwanda agreed to withdraw its troops in exchange for the disarmament and repatriation of Hutu militias, including the Democratic Forces for the Liberation of Rwanda (FDLR). A similar agreement was signed with Uganda on 6 September 2002 in Luanda, detailing the withdrawal of Ugandan forces and aiming to restore peace, particularly in the embattled Ituri region. By the end of 2002, the phased withdrawal of foreign troops, including forces from Rwanda, Uganda, Zimbabwe, Angola, and Namibia, was underway. These efforts culminated in the signing of the Global and All-Inclusive Agreement in Pretoria on 17 December 2002, which laid the foundation for a transitional power-sharing government and proposed the integration of former rebel factions into a unified national army. Despite these significant diplomatic and institutional advances, security in Tanganyika and the wider eastern DRC remained fragile. Armed groups continued to operate with relative impunity, and the integration of combatants into state structures proved inconsistent and incomplete. On 1 April 2003, delegates at the Inter-Congolese Dialogue ratified the Pretoria Agreement in Sun City, accompanied by detailed frameworks for governance and military reform. The formal inauguration of transitional institutions on 30 June 2003 represented a cautious step toward political stabilization.

== Ongoing security problems ==
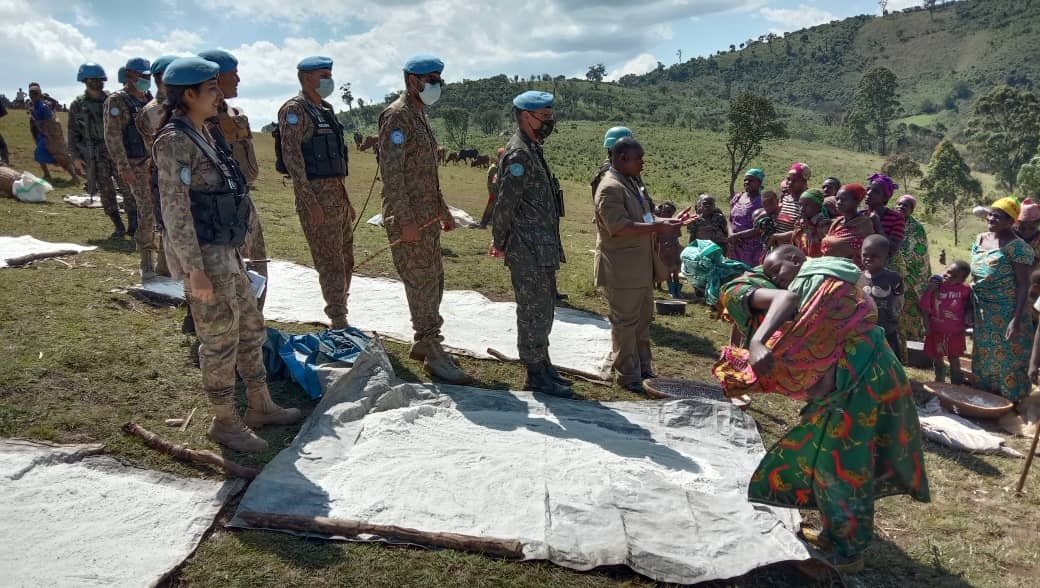
Displaced families seeking refuge in the Minembwe highlands.

=== Military confrontations with Maï-Maï Yakutumba ===
Even after the signing of the Global and All-Inclusive Agreement and the inauguration of transitional institutions, insecurity persisted. In July 2008, approximately 40 demonstrators claiming affiliation with a group known as Le Bouclier du Congo (the Shield of Congo), allied with the Maï-Maï faction led by William Yakutumba, organized a protest in Fizi Territory. The group denounced the deteriorating security situation in parts of the territory and accused local authorities of exacerbating political rivalries in various groupements. Specific references were made to disputes in the Basilotcha groupement of the Tanganyika sector, and in Kilembwe, the administrative center of the Lulenge sector, where confusion surrounding local appointments had reportedly led to increased tension and division. The demonstrators demanded the dismissal of the local territorial administration. On 8 November 2010, the town of Yungu, situated approximately 140 kilometers south of Baraka along the shores of Lake Tanganyika, was retaken by the Armed Forces of the Democratic Republic of the Congo (FARDC) following clashes with Maï-Maï Yakutumba fighters and the FDLR. The area had been under Maï-Maï control since 5 November, prompting civilian displacement toward Kazimiya and Sebele. FARDC subsequently launched search operations in the surrounding lake area and adjacent hills. Reports from the period noted incidents of looting during the operation. The Yakutumba faction admitted to losing two fighters and reported two others wounded. Their relatives claimed the attack was meant to pressure the government to uphold the commitments of the 2008 Goma Agreements, which aimed to secure a ceasefire, facilitate refugee returns, provide a general amnesty, and integrate rebel groups into the national army. The group also accused the government of showing favoritism toward the National Congress for the Defence of the People (CNDP), a rebel movement supported by Rwanda.

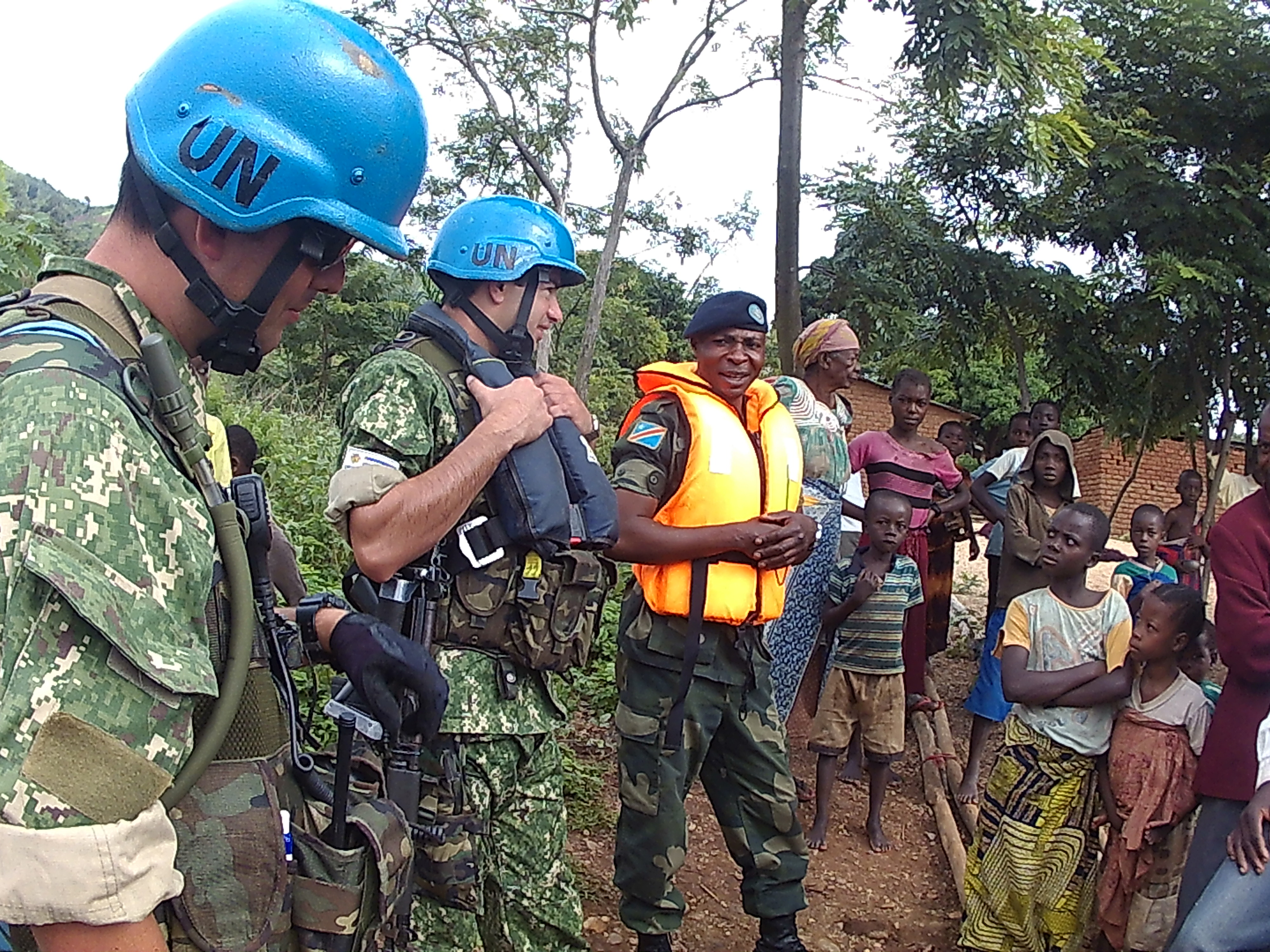
MONUSCO peacekeepers and a FARDC Navy sailor in Lamba village of Fizi Territory

In February 2011, nearly 100 former Maï-Maï combatants from the Shikito group, identified as part of the first Tanganyika brigade of the faction, emerged from the forests of Fizi Territory, surrendered to authorities in Mboko, the Tanganyika sector's capital, and were subsequently integrated into the FARDC. Continued hostilities between FARDC and Maï-Maï Yakutumba led to additional displacement, as clashes in the Ubwari Peninsula in September 2011 prompted significant numbers of civilians to flee to Baraka. It also triggered shortages of essential goods and steep increases in prices. Fighting between FARDC and Maï-Maï forces resumed on 24 October 2011 and lasted several days, and although calm was restored to the region by 4 November, the toll was high, with dozens of fatalities reported. Humanitarian assessments indicated that fewer than 10% of the estimated 6,000 displaced residents had returned to their homes in the aftermath. Similar figures were observed in the village of Kabumbe, according to human rights organizations that conducted field visits in early November.

Military operations against rebel factions continued in 2012, and in September of that year, FARDC forces reportedly killed around ten Maï-Maï fighters loyal to Colonel Mayele during offensives launched in the highlands of Tanganyika. The commander of the 1004th FARDC regiment stated that military equipment had been recovered during the operation, although FARDC sustained casualties. Maï-Maï elements, previously concentrated and visible in the hills above Mboko, ultimately retreated into the surrounding highlands. Areas such as Abeka and Swima, which had previously been under Maï-Maï control, were cleared by government forces.

=== Local intercommunal violence ===
Aside from armed conflict, the region also experienced instances of communal violence. On 30 June 2013, in the village of Ake, Tanganyika, two individuals suspected of witchcraft, a man and a woman, were killed by local youths wielding sticks and machetes, who also ransacked their homes. The attack followed the death of a 17-year-old boy, which led villagers to accuse his grandfather and aunt of supernatural involvement. Local civil society organizations criticized the inadequate response by administrative and police authorities. According to Radio Okapi, this incident was one of three instances in which residents had taken justice into their own hands in Fizi Territory over a three-month period, a trend attributed to the absence of effective state authority and the resurgence of armed groups in the region. The NGO Solidarité des Volontaires pour l'Humanité (SVH) reported that by November 2013, at least fifty lynchings had been recorded across the territory, with Tanganyika accounting for 30 of those deaths. Most of the victims were elderly women accused of witchcraft.

=== Sustained fighting with Maï-Maï Yakutumba ===
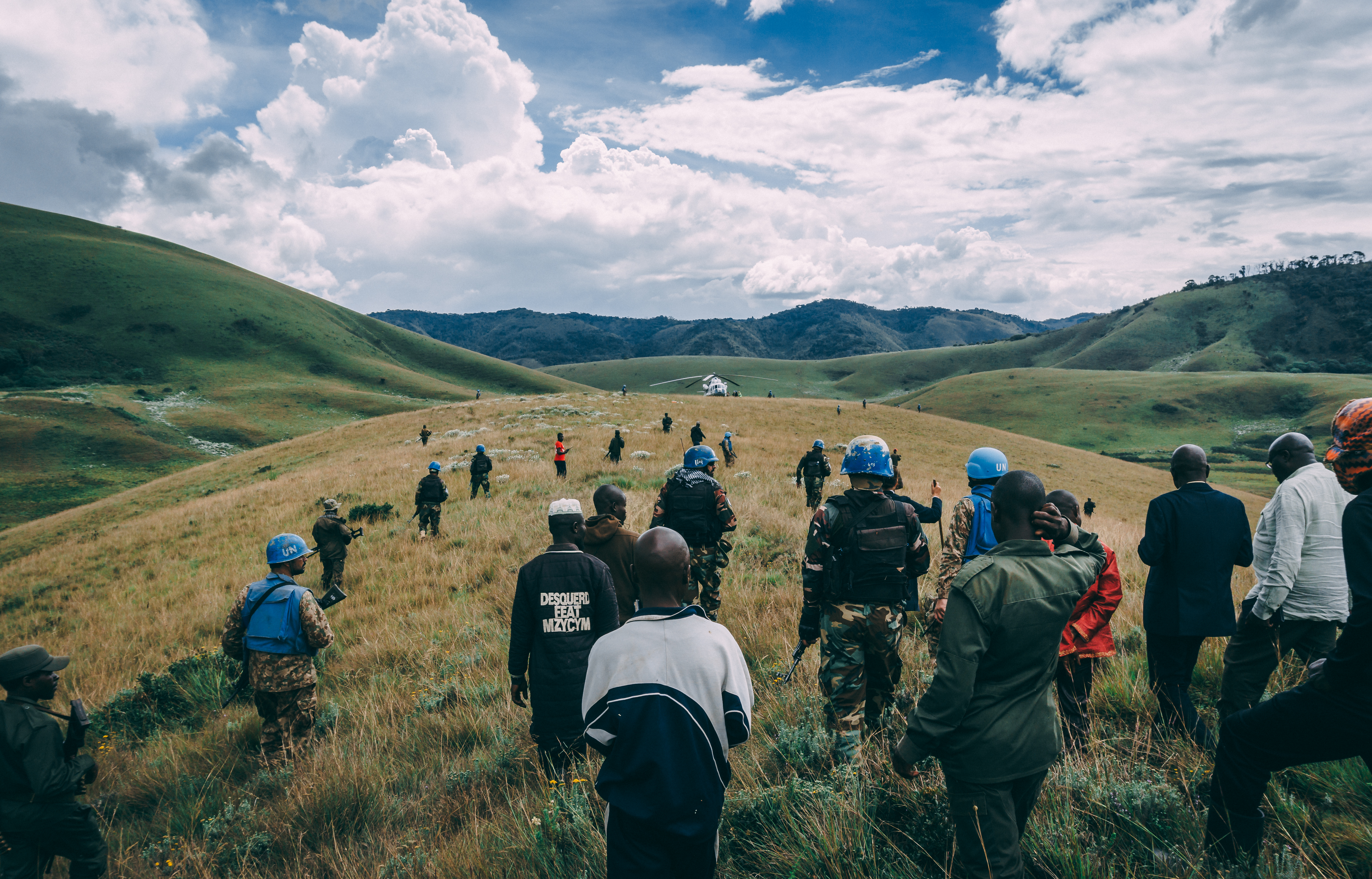
Fighters of the CNPSC with a delegation of MONUSCO peacekeepers, 23 March 2019.

In parallel with these incidents of communal violence, Tanganyika faced ongoing threats from rebel movements. In January 2014, the Maï-Maï Yakutumba reestablished its presence in the Madjaga forest near the sector. Despite previous military operations, Yakutumba remained active in the region and resistant to the Disarmament, Demobilization, Repatriation, Reintegration and Resettlement (DDRRR) process. His group, known formally as the Parti d'Action pour la Reconstruction du Kongo – Force Armée Alleluiya (Parc-Faal), demanded political recognition and amnesty for its members. Yakutumba also called for the release of several detained political allies held in prisons across Uvira, Bukavu, Kalemie, Lubumbashi, and Kinshasa. In addition to the Yakutumba faction, local authorities acknowledged the presence of other armed groups in the sector, notably those led by Bwakasala and Mayele. On 15 June 2014, the FARDC launched a successful operation to retake several lakeside towns that had fallen under the control of the Coalition Nationale pour la Défense du Congo, later renamed the Coalition Nationale du Peuple pour la Souveraineté du Congo (CNPSC), a coalition of approximately a dozen Maï-Maï factions led by Yakutumba operating in South Kivu. These towns, including Yungu, Talama, Kakono, and Kiricho, had been briefly occupied by the CNPSC after the displacement of naval units stationed in the region. The FARDC's 1004th and 1012th regiments regained control after heavy fighting, which resulted in at least two fatalities among government forces. The rebel forces retreated into the Ngandja forest and surrounding mountain caves.

Subsequent fighting in Talama on 22 June 2014 led to the deaths of five FARDC soldiers, with four more wounded. The army captured four militiamen and confiscated a PKM weapon, four AK-47 rifles, and a box of ammunition. Despite this, Maï-Maï Yakutumba spokesperson Pacifique Mutiki claimed that nine FARDC troops were killed and 18 wounded, while confirming two injuries on their side. FARDC units advanced southward and reached Wimbi, near the South Kivu–Katanga border. On 6 November 2015, armed bandits ambushed a FARDC unit on the Baraka-Uvira road between the villages of Ngalula and Bangwe Makobola, killing a captain and triggering security operations across the Tanganyika middle plateaus. In response, FARDC troops began a manhunt in this already volatile region, where armed groups, suspected to be Maï-Maï militias or Burundian Forces Nationales de Libération (FNL) rebels, were still harassing civilians. The area was reportedly infiltrated by Maï-Maï and FNL elements. In July 2016, reports surfaced of armed men speaking Kirundi in the Bijombo highlands (Uvira Territory) recruiting youth from the Lusenda refugee camp. These individuals, affiliated with the Burundian rebel group Forces Républicaines du Burundi (FOREBU), were believed to be conducting cross-border operations and recruitment in Tanganyika. Several suspected recruits were arrested in the area, including three in Tanganyika.

On 1 January, a Maï-Maï Yakutumba incursion into Yungu led to the death of a FARDC soldier and disrupted local New Year celebrations. The rebels attacked from both the hills and Lake Tanganyika, initiating two days of fighting. Though FARDC regained control, the event heightened fears of further violence. On 29 June 2017, CNPSC forces attacked Lulimba, forcing the FARDC to abandon their positions and allowing rebels to loot weapons and spread panic in nearby towns such as Misisi and Kilembwe. On 23 September, Maï-Maï Yakutumba forces seized several villages near Mboko, including Nundu, Kabumbe, Lusambo, Swima, and Munene. On 25 September, fierce fighting erupted as the FARDC launched operations to recapture Mboko, which had been under rebel control for two days. Six militiamen were reportedly killed. During this time, daily life in Mboko ground to a halt: shops, schools, and humanitarian operations were suspended, and civilians remained indoors, fearing military retaliation. The FARDC retook Mboko on 1 October, forcing the rebels to withdraw without further combat. This recapture was seen as a strategic victory, as it secured both National Road No. 5 and access to Lake Tanganyika while reducing the threat to the nearby city of Uvira. However, tensions remained high. A 48-hour ultimatum issued by the FARDC on 30 September demanded that Yakutumba disarm. In response, Yakutumba rejected the terms, citing broken promises by the government, including the failure to reintegrate his fighters who had previously surrendered. These grievances continued to fuel resistance and hinder the success of peace initiatives in the sector.

=== Multi-factional violence ===
In February 2018, FARDC escalated its campaign against Yakutumba with a large-scale offensive in the Sokola 2 operational sector in southern South Kivu. After ten days of combat, the army reported 89 deaths, including 83 rebel fighters and six FARDC personnel. General Philémon Yav, commander of the operation, announced that almost all areas previously controlled by Yakutumba, including the Ubwari Peninsula and the Tanganyika lakeshore from Kalemie to Uvira, had been recaptured. The operation led to the capture of 120 militiamen, including senior commanders such as Ekanda Saidi Dragila, Yakutumba's marine commander. Despite these gains, Yakutumba himself, reportedly injured, evaded capture and fled into the bush. South Kivu's vice-governor, Hilaire Kasusa Kikobya Baruani, expressed satisfaction with the military's success and emphasized efforts to re-establish state authority in liberated zones through police deployment and the reinstallation of local governance structures. However, the region remained volatile, with lake traffic suspended and displaced residents advised not to return immediately. On 15 February 2018, FARDC forces captured more than fifteen Yakutumba combatants in the Ngandja forest and seized a stockpile of weapons, such as submachine guns and infantry support arms, though the group's leader managed to escape.

In June 2018, new violence erupted between Twirwaneho militiamen, primarily Banyamulenge, and a coalition of Bafuliiru, Banyindu, and Babembe armed groups. Clashes were driven by ethnic tensions, disputes over land, and competition for customary authority. The Twirwaneho received reinforcements from a Rwandan armed group based in Bijabo, located in the highlands of the Tanganyika sector, and established their base in Masango with support from a Burundian rebel faction. The conflict resulted in extensive displacement, the burning of homes, loss of livestock, and the depopulation of several northern Bijombo villages. Many residents fled to FARDC-controlled areas seeking protection. In response to growing insecurity, FARDC's Sokola 2 command demanded the disarmament of all local and foreign armed groups operating in Uvira Territory and the surrounding highlands on 11 February 2019. Several groups expressed a willingness to disarm, including Maï-Maï leader Trésor Ebuela wa Seba (alias Ebuela Mtetezi), who appeared in Mikenge (Mwenga Territory) with 300 fighters ready to lay down arms. Three other local factions in the Tanganyika sector also indicated a desire to surrender through MONUSCO in Lusenda. However, the region remained entangled in transnational conflict dynamics, as numerous Congolese factions were allied with foreign rebel groups, including RED-Tabara, FNL, and FOREBU, Burundian and Rwandan forces that FARDC warned to vacate Congolese territory or face military action. On 28 February, the FARDC transferred four child soldiers to MONUSCO in Uvira — three were linked to the local Kihebe and Yakutumba militias, while the fourth, a Burundian, was part of Kayumba Nyamwasa's Rwandan rebel faction. The children, aged 13 to 16, stated they had been forcibly conscripted and deployed in combat zones in both Tanganyika and Uvira's middle plateaus.

On 9 May, violent clashes erupted in the Balala-Nord groupement between a faction led by Ebuela and Banyamulenge militiamen. The fighting was reportedly triggered by the killing of a village chief from the Banyindu community by Banyamulenge fighters. In retaliation, Ebuela's group attacked multiple villages, including Mikalati, Kanihura, Kamombo, Kabara, Oma, and Alumya. The violence resulted in the mass displacement of civilians to the Itombwe (Mwenga Territory) and Mutambala sectors. Local civil society organization Group of Voices of the Voiceless (Groupe des Voix des Sans Voix, GVSV) reported that at least 20 people were killed. Sokola 2 military officials acknowledged that local police forces were overwhelmed, prompting army intervention. While the military later claimed to have brought the situation under control. Further violence unfolded on 15 October 2019, when Mai-Mai militias launched an assault on FARDC positions in and around Minembwe-centre. Although the attack failed, the conflict expanded rapidly as armed groups from Mutambala overwhelmed several army posts and torched the village of Kalonge. These events triggered a large-scale population displacement and led MONUSCO to reinforce its presence in November by deploying Static Combat Detachments (SCD) to strategic hotspots, including Bijombo and Kamombo in Tanganyika, supplementing the main base at Minembwe.

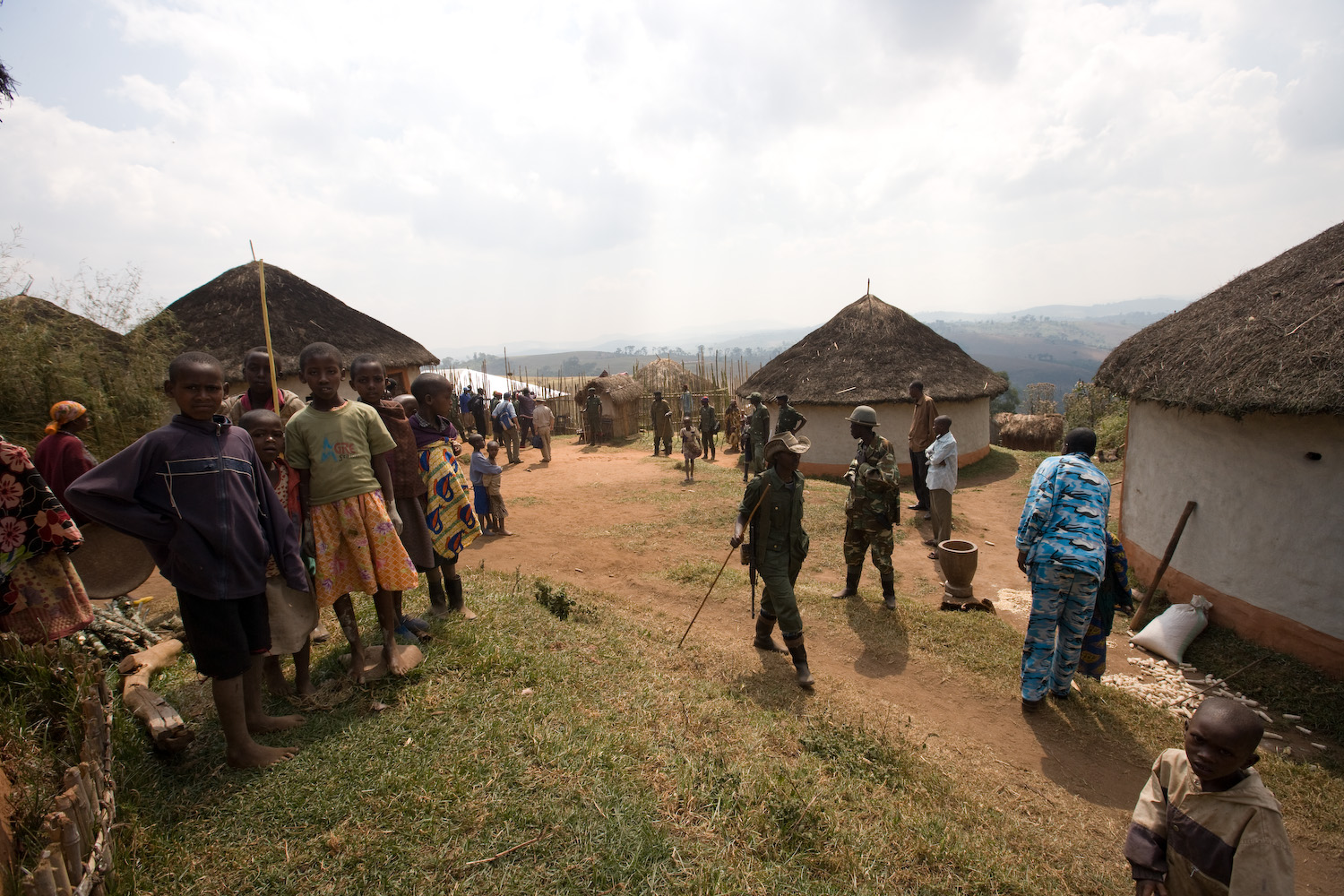
Traditional round huts with thatched roofs in Kamombo village, located in the Balala-Nord groupement

In June 2020, fighting intensified in nearby Mwenga Territory, with spillover effects reaching Tanganyika. On 4 June, Twirwaneho attacked a FARDC position in Tuwetuwe, which resulted in the deaths of two militia members and injuries to three others, including one civilian. As fighting escalated, many residents fled toward the forest or nearby towns such as Mikenge and Kipupu. Although the army claimed to have repelled the attack, doubts remained among the local population about the state's ability to provide lasting protection. Some families fled as far as Tanganyika to escape the violence. Simultaneously, Tanganyika's highlands became the site of additional hostilities involving Michel Rukunda Makanika, a mutinous ex-army colonel who had taken control of parts of Kamombo. While Makanika denied formal alliances with the Gumino and Twirwaneho factions, all three shared grievances against FARDC, accusing it of failing to prevent village burnings, killings, and livestock theft. Makanika issued a public call for peace and urged all armed groups to disarm, though his motives were viewed with suspicion by rivals such as the Maï-Maï Biloze Bishambuke, who accused the coalition of concealing ulterior objectives. On 20 June, violence escalated further when a coalition of Ngumino, Makanika, and Androïd forces launched a coordinated surprise attack on FARDC positions in Kamombo, located in Balala-Nord. The assault resulted in the deaths of two Congolese soldiers and forced the FARDC to withdraw toward Mikenge to avoid harming civilians in densely populated areas. This retreat led to renewed fear among residents, particularly those displaced and living near the MONUSCO base, prompting many to flee again, especially toward Kipupu. The same day, additional clashes erupted in Kalingi (north of Minembwe) and Kakenge (south of Minembwe). In Kalingi, Ngumino fighters engaged in deadly combat with the Maï-Maï Ebuela, resulting in three fatalities. In Kakenge, a confrontation between Ngumino and the Maï-Maï Biloze Bishambuke tragically led to the death of a 7-year-old child.

On 10 December 2020, armed bandits ambushed three motorcyclists from Baraka in Munene village in Tanganyika, robbing them of $700 and two phones before letting them go. In January 2021, MONUSCO further scaled back its presence by closing its operational base in Lusenda. Tensions escalated further in December 2021, when Gumino fighters and their allies launched coordinated attacks on FARDC positions in Kamombo, Namara, and Tchakira, villages of the Balala-Nord groupement. These areas eventually came under the control of forces loyal to Makanika. By August 2022, public sentiment against MONUSCO had reached a boiling point, with demonstrations demanding the mission's withdrawal taking place in Baraka, throughout Fizi Territory, and in Mboko, the Tanganyika's administrative center. To reassert control, FARDC forces began localized security operations. On 27 January 2023, elements of the FARDC's 222nd battalion, stationed in Mboko, apprehended three armed men in Chonwe village within the Basimukuma-Nord groupement. Nevertheless, violence persisted: between January and April 2023, at least 24 targeted killings were reported in Tanganyika. On 16 June, Twirwaneho launched an assault on the joint positions of the East African Community Regional Force (EACRF), Burundi's armed forces, and FARDC in Nyamara village, Kamombo. Both sides intensified troop deployments in preparation for protracted engagement. In response to the deepening crisis, MONUSCO initiated new peacebuilding mechanisms and on 6 July 2024, launched the Consultative Commissions for the Resolution of Customary Conflicts (CCRCC) across Tanganyika, Mutambala, Lulenge, and Ngandja. These commissions, composed of traditional chiefs and civil society actors, were established to promote peaceful dialogue and mediation in areas where customary land and leadership disputes frequently serve as triggers for violence. On 22 July 2024, the Military Garrison Court of Uvira held a mobile session in Mboko, sentencing three FARDC soldiers to death. The men were convicted of murder, attempted murder, disobedience, and the loss of military ammunition in connection with a shooting on 22 June in Babungwe-Nord groupement that claimed the life of a traditional leader and several others.

== Economy ==
Tanganyika is largely agrarian. Agriculture is the main livelihood activity, supported by fertile soils suitable for crops such as cassava, maize, peanuts, rice, and yam. These crops are used for local consumption and commercial trade, particularly through the Basimukuma-Nord market, which supplies neighboring regions, including Uvira and parts of Burundi. However, agricultural production was significantly disrupted between 1996 and 2002 due to ongoing conflict, land disputes, disruption of planting cycles, and occupation of farmlands by armed groups such as the Mai-Mai and Raïa Mutomboki. Despite these challenges, Basimukuma-Nord is still recognized for its agricultural potential and is often regarded as a key food-producing area within Fizi Territory.

Livestock farming, once an important part of the sector's economy, has declined sharply due to systematic looting during successive conflicts. Armed actors, including militia groups, military personnel, and criminal elements, targeted livestock herds, resulting in the near-collapse of this economic sector. Today, recovery in both agriculture and livestock remains constrained by persistent insecurity and limited infrastructural investment.

== Demographics ==
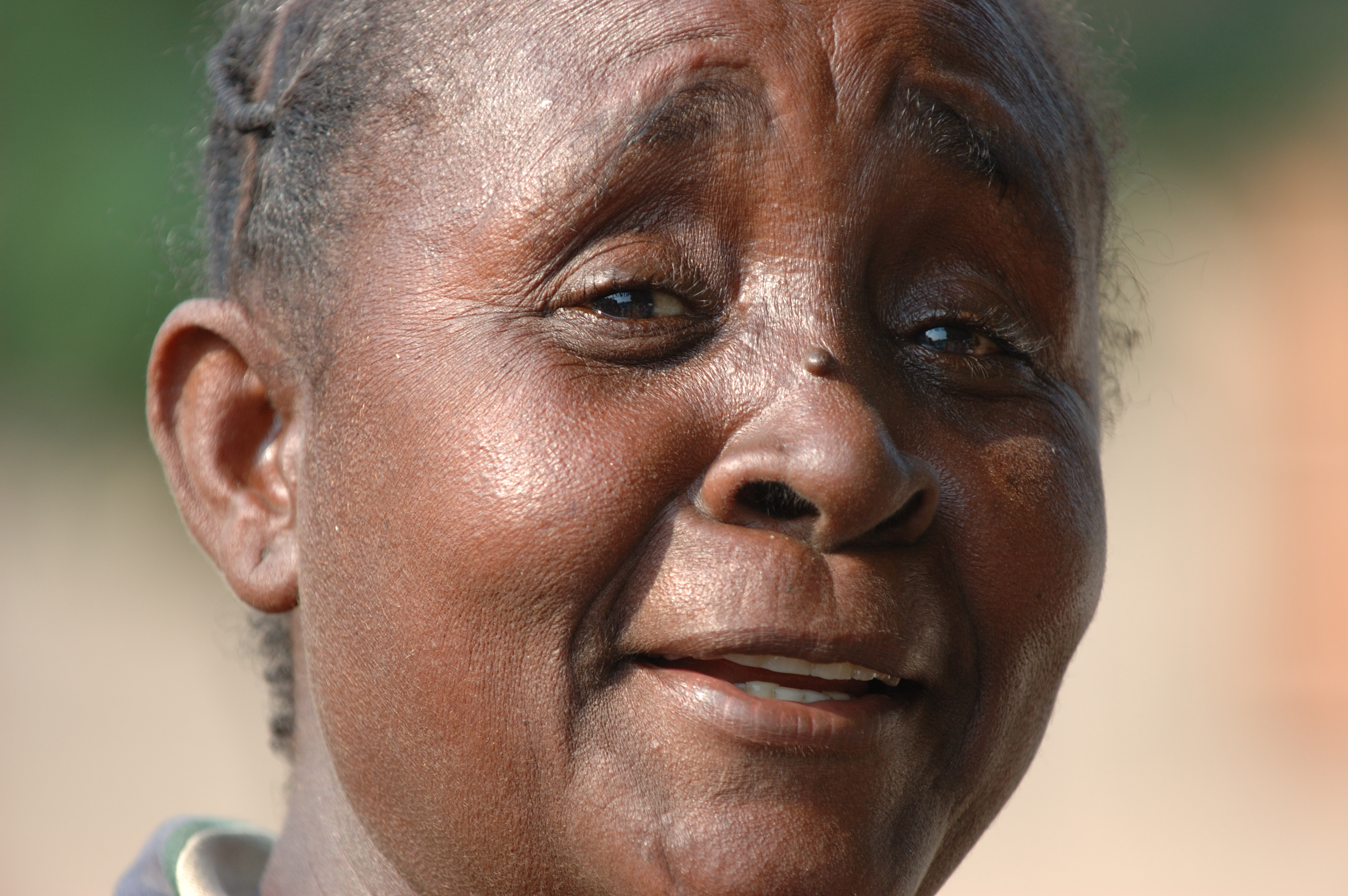
An older woman from the city of Baraka in South Kivu

Tanganyika has an estimated population of 284,916 as of 2014, with a population density of approximately 47 inhabitants per square kilometer. Babembe, who are indigenous to the region, constitute about three-quarters of the population and are the majority in the plains and on the mid-altitude plateaus. Other indigenous communities include the Bazoba, along with smaller groups such as the Bafuliiru, Bashi, Barega, Banyamulenge, Banyidu, and Barundi. The sector has limited health and educational infrastructure; for example, in the groupement of Basimukuma-Nord alone, there are two health centers, two health posts, eight primary schools, and four secondary schools.

== Humanitarian situation ==
=== Refugee influx and related strains ===
Since 2015, Tanganyika Sector has hosted a significant number of Burundian refugees fleeing political instability in their home country. On 11 May 2015, the Congolese National Commission for Refugees (Commission Nationale pour les Réfugiés, CNR) reported that out of 7,836 registered Burundian refugees, 462 had received biometric identification cards at the UNHCR transit center in Kavimvira, Uvira Territory. These individuals were transferred to the Lusenda refugee camp, located in Tongo within the Tanganyika sector. The displacement was triggered by pre-election tensions in Burundi as President Pierre Nkurunziza sought a controversial third term, sparking widespread violence. However, the sudden arrival of refugees in Kamanyola, Lubarika, Katogota, Luvungi, and Luberizi placed considerable pressure on host communities, particularly in areas already affected by agricultural setbacks such as cassava mosaic disease. Civil society organizations, such as the Association Against Evil and for Youth Empowerment (Association Contre le Mal et pour l'Encadrement de la Jeunesse, ACMEJ), raised concerns about the inability of local households to support refugees, many of whom arrived without food or supplies.

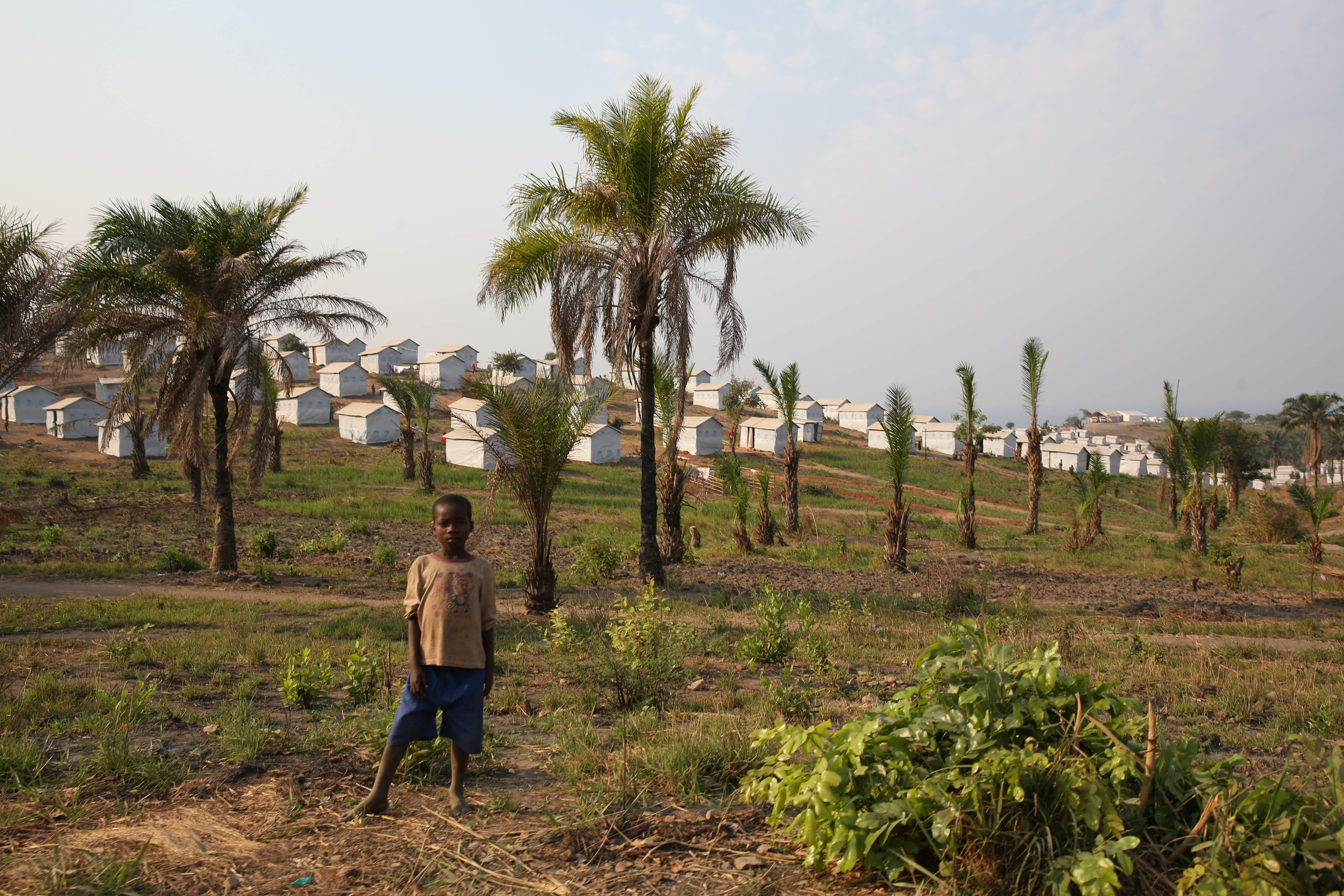
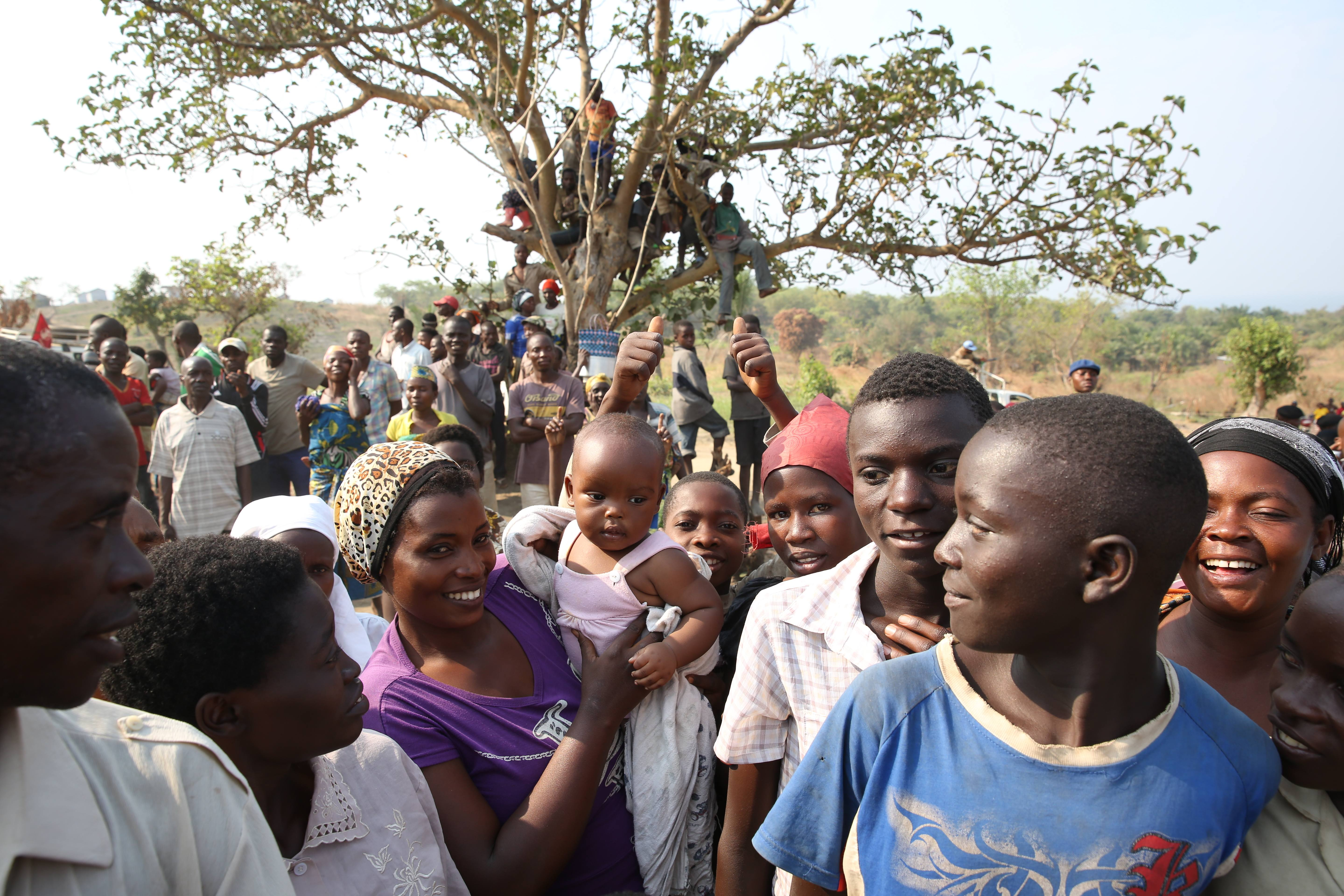
Lusenda Refugee Camp, located in the Tanganyika sector, was established in 2015 to host Burundian refugees fleeing political unrest and is operated by the United Nations High Commissioner for Refugees (UNHCR).

A humanitarian delegation from UNHCR visited Lusenda on 25 May 2015 to assess conditions at the camp, which at the time lacked essential services such as potable water, adequate shelter, lighting, food variety, and security. In response to overcrowding, the CNR identified three additional sites on 19 July, Lulinda and Lubumba in Tanganyika, and Mulongwe in Mutambala, to accommodate around 7,000 refugees who could not be housed at Lusenda. These new locations were chosen for their proximity to rivers, schools, and healthcare facilities. Frustration over unfulfilled promises led to public protests. On 17 May 2016, residents blocked traffic on National Road No. 5 between Uvira and Baraka, demanding compensation for the land given to the refugee camp and the reinstatement of free healthcare and school subsidies that had previously been supported by the UNHCR. Protesters highlighted unmet commitments to rehabilitate key infrastructure, especially the 54-kilometer agricultural access road between Lusenda and Abala. Demonstrators threatened to dismantle the Lusenda camp if their demands were not addressed. Sector Chief John Mulondani, together with traditional leaders from the Balala-Nord, Basimunyaka-Nord, and Basimukuma-Nord groupements, mediated the crisis and managed to restore calm. Nonetheless, in October 2017, the FARDC expressed concern about the camp's proximity to the Burundian border and suggested relocating the refugees farther inland for security reasons. Efforts to promote community cohesion culminated in the rehabilitation of the Tout Jeune de Lusenda stadium, a project funded by the UNHCR and completed on 20 February 2019. Measuring 105 meters by 65 meters, the stadium was intended to serve as a communal space for Burundian refugees, local Congolese youth, humanitarian staff, and MONUSCO peacekeepers, notably those from the Pakistani contingent. The opening event featured a football match between Umoja FC, a Congolese youth team from Lusenda, and Indamba, a team composed of Burundian refugees.

On 15 October, clashes erupted in the highlands of Fizi Territory, particularly around Minembwe-centre, as Mai-Mai fighters launched an unsuccessful assault on FARDC positions. However, the violence rapidly expanded, with militiamen from Mutambala overwhelming several army posts before attacking and burning the village of Kalonge. The entire populations of Kalonge, Kaseke, Rutigita, and Irumba fled toward Minembwe-centre, while local civil society estimated that nearly 500 civilians, mainly women and children, escaped the forest fighting and sought refuge in Mikenge (Mwenga Territory). The displacement was part of a broader pattern of forced movement linked to violent confrontations in towns such as Mikalati, Bichogo, Nyamara, and Murugondo in the Balala-Nord groupement. Approximately 400 people took refuge at the MONUSCO Temporary Operational Base in Mikenge. According to a humanitarian briefing by OCHA, access to those conflict-affected areas had remained extremely limited due to insecurity, while urgent needs for food, shelter, health services, and household items had largely gone unmet. Another escalation happened on 4 November, when inter-ethnic violence erupted in the village of Kirumba, located in the highlands of Bijombo. Clashes between the Gumino fighters and Mai-Mai militias resulted in house burnings, retaliatory attacks, and the killing of civilians, including a local church leader and two of his brothers. The violence triggered mass displacement among the Fuliiru, Nyindu, and Banyamulenge communities. Some victims fled into the forest, while others moved toward the village of Mibula in the Babungwe-Nord groupement. On 21 July 2020, four Burundian nationals were detained at Lulinda beach in Tanganyika after attempting to enter the area by boat. While one woman escaped custody, the three remaining men were arrested and transferred for investigation. Although they claimed refugee status from the Lusenda camp, officials did not recognize them. Tensions mounted in November 2021 when a group of Mai-Mai fighters infiltrated the Lusenda camp, killing a Burundian refugee and seizing livestock, prompting refugees from fifteen villages in Katungulu to demonstrate before the CNR office, demanding either repatriation to Burundi or relocation outside Fizi Territory.

=== Internally displaced persons ===
In May 2019, violent clashes between Mai-Mai militias and Ngomino community groups led to the displacement of over 2,494 households from highland villages to lower-altitude regions along the Lake Tanganyika shoreline, particularly within the groupements of Basimukuma-Nord, Basimunyaka-Nord, and Balala-Nord. A joint assessment conducted by United Nations agencies and humanitarian organizations from 25 October to 1 November 2022, accentuated the intensifying humanitarian needs, especially in the wake of further military operations and inter-group violence that forced the displacement of approximately 19,815 people (about 3,963 households) between August and October 2022. Many of these people fled violence in localités such as Bigaragara, Magunga, and Kalonge, with some relocating to the Mitumba Mountains due to environmental familiarity.

Access to displaced populations remains a major logistical challenge. The main road linking Fizi Centre to Lusuku is only partially rehabilitated, leaving nearly 20 kilometers in poor condition, while many affected villages are only reachable by hours of hiking. Humanitarian actors including the Association de Lutte contre la Pauvreté dans le Fizi (ALPF), the International Committee of the Red Cross (ICRC), HEKS-EPER, and International Medical Corps (IMC) are engaged in relief efforts, but shelter, water, and basic service provision remain inadequate. Displaced persons are primarily hosted by local families or live in informal sites under precarious conditions. Security remains fragile, with some villages under the protection of FARDC, while others are policed by local self-defense groups. Incidents of theft, extortion, gender-based violence, and the killing of civilians have been reported, exacerbating the vulnerability of the population and impeding their safe return to their places of origin. On 30 October 2021, over 2,000 IDPs, mainly women and children, departed the Mushimbakye site and returned to villages located 27 kilometers west in the middle plateaus of Baraka. Many cited poor humanitarian conditions, xenophobic hostility, and physical and psychological violence in displacement sites as reasons for leaving. Convoys of trucks facilitated the return of 1,200 people, while others remained at the Lusenda site in Tanganyika, after fleeing from villages such as Mugono, Rutabura, and Mugorore. As of January 2025, Tanganyika hosted 19,613 IDPs who had fled due to fighting between the FARDC and the Makanika-Android-Gumino alliance in the highlands of Fizi Territory in December 2024.
