= Lulenge =

Sector in the Fizi Territory, South Kivu, Democratic Republic of the Congo

Coordinates: 6°44′S 26°00′E

- Sector
- Secteur de Lulenge
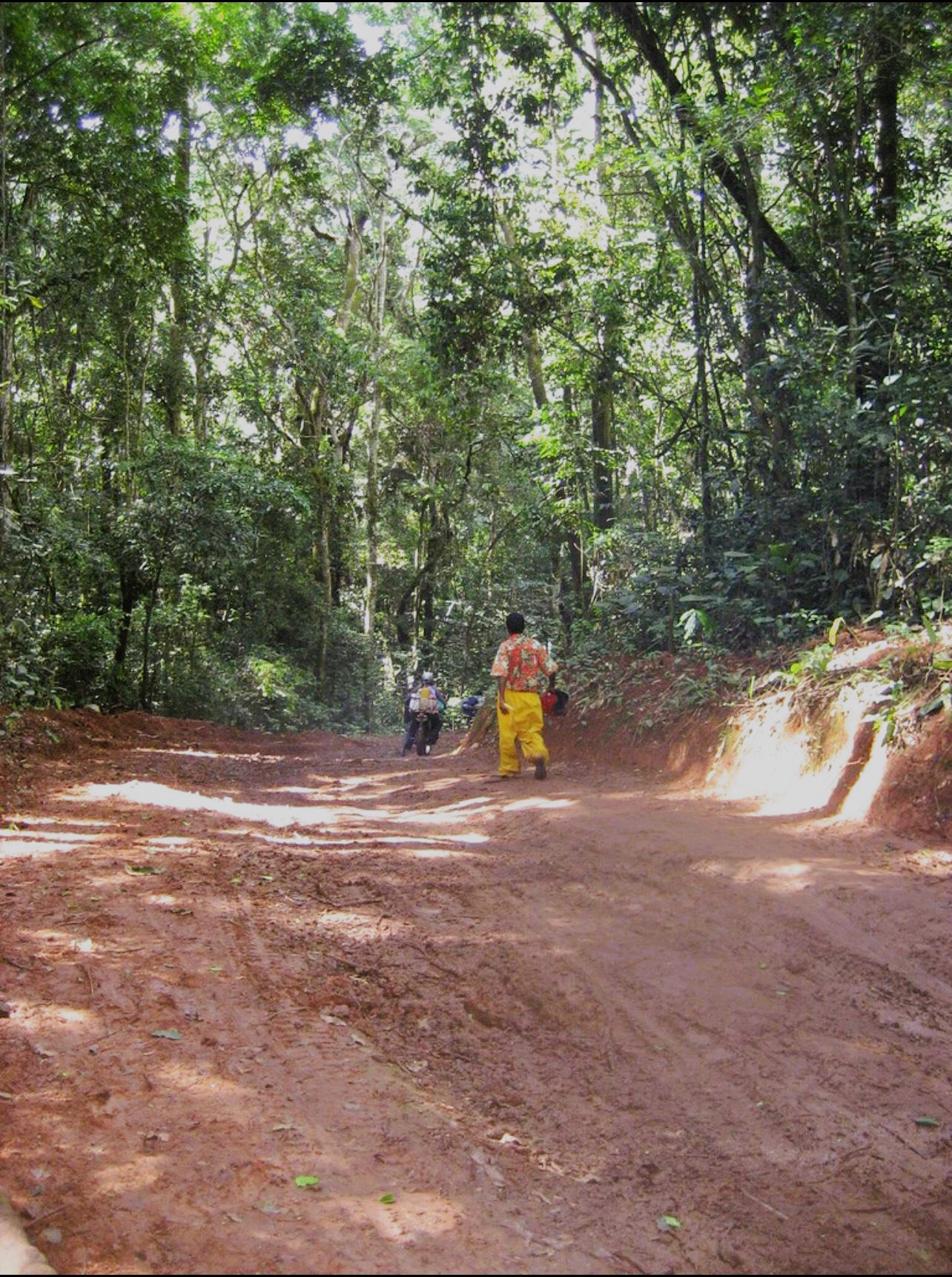
- Kilembwe serves as the sector's capital, November 2007

- Location within Democratic Republic of the Congo
- Country: DR Congo
- Province: South Kivu
- Territory: Fizi
- Capital: Kilembwe

Government
  - Chef de secteur: Samuel Mulumba Kabindula

Area
  - Total: 5,530 km^{2} (2,140 sq mi)

Population (2014)
  - Total: 187,806
- Time zone: UTC+2 (CAT)

Lulenge constitutes one of the four sectors within the Fizi Territory of the South Kivu province, situated in the eastern region of the Democratic Republic of the Congo. It spans an area of approximately 5,530 square kilometers, making it the second-largest sector in the territory after Ngandja. As of 2014, Lulenge had a population of 187,806, with its administrative center based in Kilembwe. The sector shares borders with Ngandja to the east, Wakabongo Chiefdom in Shabunda Territory to the west, Itombwe sector of Mwenga Territory to the north, Babuyu and Babangubangu Salamabila sectors of Kabambare Territory to the south and southwest, Mutambala and Tanganyika sectors to the northeast, and Wamuzimu Chiefdom of Mwenga Territory to the northwest.

Lulenge is administratively divided into five groupements: Basimimbi, Basimunyaka-Sud, Basikasingo, Basombo, and Obekulu. The sector is linguistically diverse, with Kibembe spoken by the majority of residents. Other languages spoken include Kibuyu, Kinyarwanda (among the Banyamulenge in Minembwe), as well as Kifuliiru and Kinyindu. Lulenge's economy is primarily based on agriculture and mining, with fishing from Lake Tanganyika also playing an important role. Agricultural cooperatives, such as the Coopérative Business Centre Olive (CBCO), are active in the area, cultivating crops including cassava, peanuts, beans, mushrooms, and rice. Small-scale enterprises are also well-developed in the area.

Since the First Congo War, Lulenge has been embroiled in persistent conflicts. The emergence of the Ngumino and Twirwaneho militias in November 2021 has exacerbated ethnic tension between Babembe and Banyamulenge populations. Verbal and physical attacks against the Babembe, Bafuliiru, and Banyamulenge have proliferated in Lulenge.

== Geography ==
=== Terrain and climate ===
Lulenge is predominantly mountainous, shaped in large part by the presence of the Mitumba mountain range. Altitudes in the northeastern part of the sector range between 1,500 and 2,000 meters, giving the area a rugged topography. In contrast, the southeastern part is characterized by a relatively flat plain that stretches along the Lwama River. The soils across the sector vary by location: they are typically clay-sandy and highly fertile, supporting diverse agricultural activities. In the plains, the soil is predominantly sandy; alluvial deposits are common along the riverbanks, while the mountain slopes and plateaus feature mostly clayey soils.

Lulenge is traversed by numerous rivers and streams, most of which feed into the Congo River via the Lwama River, which also serves as a natural boundary between Lulenge and the Babuyu sector in Kabambare Territory. Significant rivers in the area include the Ama, Alumya, Malonge, Lukwa, Mukolochi, Namutambala, Makembe, Ahemya, and Kobokobo, which marks the boundary between South Kivu and Maniema provinces. The Bibizi and Lumembe Rivers delineate the border with Shabunda Territory, while the Bitongo River flows northward through the Bitongo Forest and empties into the Elila River. In addition, there are many small streams throughout the area.

Vegetation is dominated by grassy savannas and gallery forests along rivers, while the north hosts the expansive Bitongo Forest, an extension of the larger Itombwe Forest. This forested area provides important habitat for a variety of animal species and plays a significant ecological role. On the high plateaus, steppelike vegetation prevails, offering suitable pasture for livestock, which forms a key component of the local economy.

Climatically, Lulenge experiences considerable regional variation due to its geographical diversity. The mountainous regions enjoy a cool, temperate highland climate, while the plains tend to be hot and dry. The area as a whole follows a bimodal seasonal pattern, with a long rainy season extending from September to May and a short dry season from June to mid-September. These conditions support multiple agricultural cycles. Farming practices are adapted to seasonal patterns, with specific types of cultivation such as Akekye (post-bush-burning planting), Ebilo (forest clearing for crops), Pombo (savanna field cultivation), Ekongo (swamp-based farming), and Eunde (re-cultivation of fallow lands) playing vital roles in the local agricultural economy.

=== Governance and administrative divisions ===
The Lulenge sector is led by an elected official known traditionally as the Mwami (Chief), formally referred to as the Chef de secteur (Sector Head), who is invested with authority by the provincial government. The sector's governance system is composed of two principal bodies: the Sector Council (Conseil de secteur), which serves as the deliberative organ, and the Sector Executive College (Collège exécutif du secteur), which acts as the executive branch.

- The Sector Council is composed of sector councilors elected by universal, direct, and secret ballot in accordance with national electoral law. This council is responsible for deliberating on matters of local interest, and it elects both the Sector Head and the Deputy Sector Head (Chef de secteur adjoint), who are subsequently invested by the Provincial Governor. If this investiture does not occur within fifteen days of their election, it becomes automatic by law. The council is led by a bureau consisting of a President, vice-president, and Rapporteur, elected according to the council's internal regulations, with consideration for gender representation where applicable.
- The Sector Executive College, the body charged with implementing the council's decisions and managing day-to-day affairs, consists of the Sector Head, the Deputy Sector Head, and two Aldermen appointed by the Sector Head, subject to approval by the council. These appointments are guided by criteria such as competence, credibility, and community representativeness. The Deputy Sector Head assists in administrative duties and assumes leadership in the absence of the Sector Head. The Aldermen support executive functions as assigned through formal decrees.
- The Sector Head serves as the chief administrative and regulatory authority in Lulenge, tasked with ensuring the enforcement of laws and regulations at the national, provincial, and sectoral levels. This role includes maintaining civil status records, acting as a judicial police officer with general jurisdiction, authorizing sector budgets, overseeing tax collection, and representing the sector in legal matters and engagements with external parties. The Sector Head also holds responsibility for public order, with authority to coordinate with national police forces deployed in the area.

At the grassroots level, Lulenge is subdivided into administrative units known as groupements (groupings), each led by a chef de groupement (Group Leader). These groupements function to enhance local governance, facilitate service delivery, and strengthen community organization. Each groupement is further divided into localités (villages), overseen by a chef de localité or chef de village.

==== Groupements and localités ====
The Lulenge sector is made up of five groupements:

Groupements
1.	Basimimbi
2.	Basimunyaka-Sud
3.	Basikasingo
4.	Basombo
5.	Obekulu

== Demographics ==
As of the 2014 census conducted by the civil status office of the Lulenge sector, the population was estimated at 187,806 inhabitants, resulting in a population density of approximately 36 inhabitants per square kilometer.

Population distribution by groupement:

No.	Groupements	Total population
1. 2. 3. 4. 5.	Basimunyaka-Sud Basombo Basikasingo Basimimbi Obekulu	37,107 48,133 20,858 52,193 29,515
	Total	187,806

Source: Lulenge sector, 2014 annual census conducted by the Civil Status Office.

Kibembe is the predominant language spoken by the vast majority of the population. Kibuyu is spoken by a smaller segment of the population, limited to a portion of the Basikasingo groupement. Kinyarwanda is used by the Banyamulenge community, primarily settled near Mount Mulenge and the Minembwe high plateaus. Additionally, in the Basimunyaka-Sud groupement, languages such as Kifuliiru and Kinyindu are also spoken. Swahili and Lingala, the national languages of the Democratic Republic of the Congo, are spoken by a minority and serve as lingua francas for broader communication.

Settlement patterns in Lulenge are largely organized around kinship networks and geographical convenience, with villages typically located along main roads and near water sources. These villages are spaced at intervals ranging from 1 to 15 kilometers. Social organization in the sector is influenced by administrative structures and traditional customs, particularly those of the Bembe and Buyu peoples, who play a central role in local governance and cultural practices.

The built environment in the sector reflects the impact of historical conflict. The sector endured significant destruction during periods of inter-ethnic violence, during which many homes were looted, burned, or otherwise destroyed. In recent years, however, efforts at pacification have led to a resurgence in reconstruction. Most new homes are built from locally made dobe (mud-bricks) and are predominantly roofed with straw. A smaller number of houses are roofed with corrugated metal sheets.

== History ==
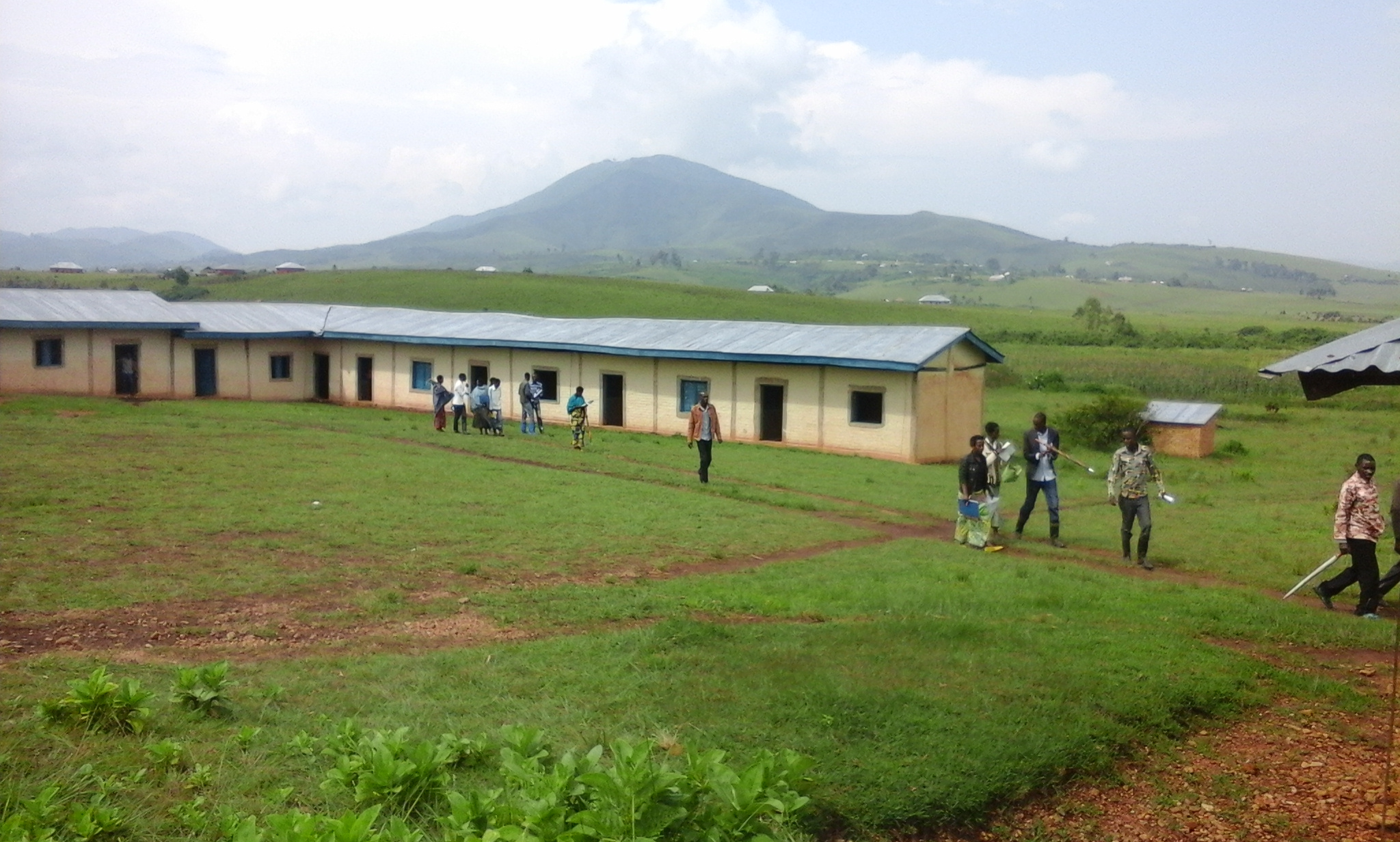
University students heading home after a day of classes at Eben-Ezer University of Minembwe

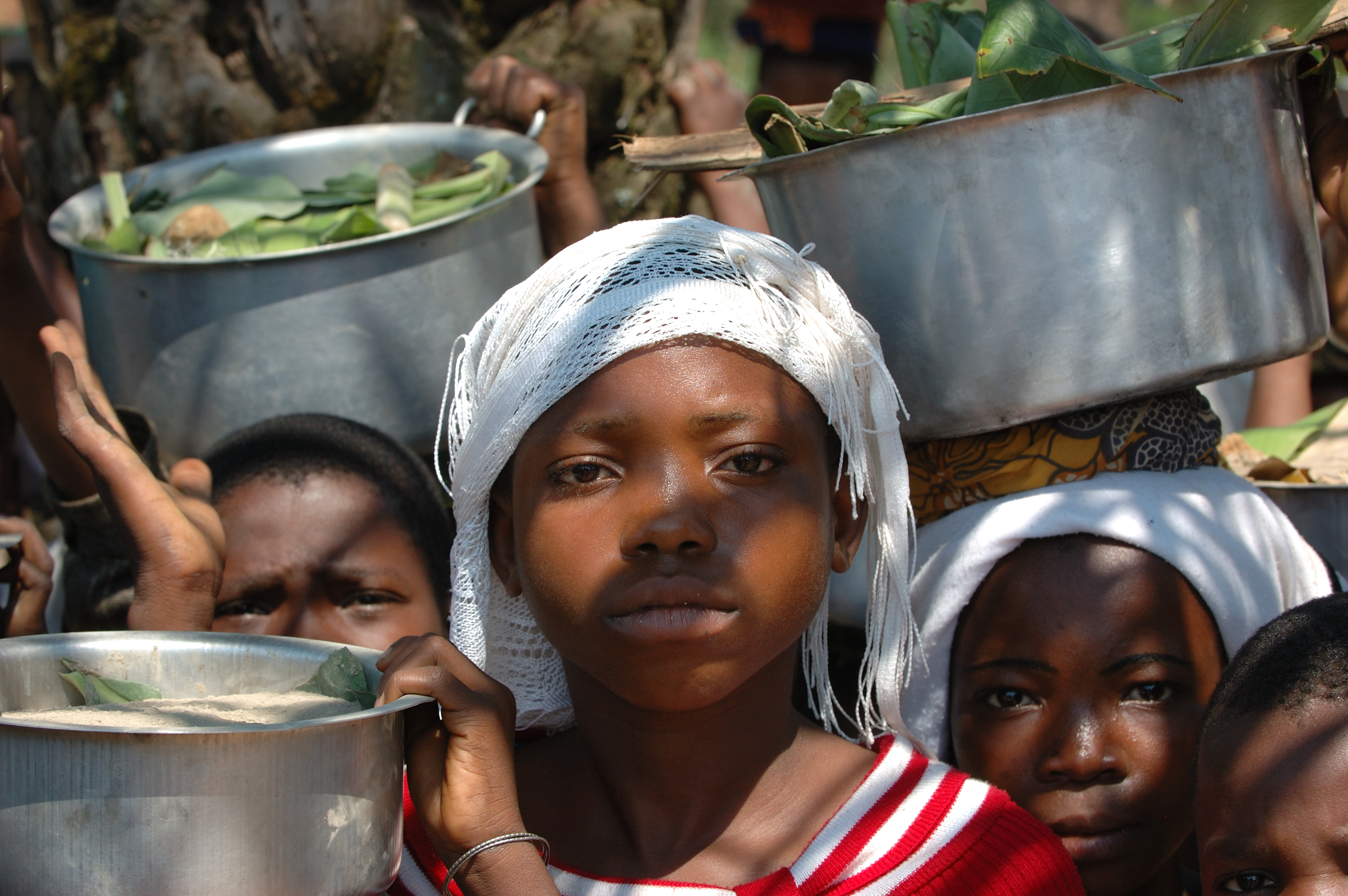
Children participating in a community school rehabilitation project in Minembwe

In 1937, Fizi Territory was subdivided into five sectors: Itombwe, Lulenge, Mutambala, Ngandja, and Tanganyika. Itombwe Sector was later incorporated into Mwenga Territory on 31 December 1947. Lulenge was a historic chieftaincy inhabited by the Babuyu and Babembe communities. They resided in an environment characterized by cultural heterogeneity. To the north and east, there were patrilineal agro-pastoralist-oriented communities, while the west was inhabited by the related patrilineal Lega communities, known for their agriculture, hunting, and food-gathering practices. To the south were matrilineal hunters and agriculturalists, descendants of the northern Luba cluster. The Buyu were the first to settle in the region, while the Bembe established themselves later, migrating from the mountains to occupy the remaining land due to Babuyu's sparse population. During the 20th century, under the Belgian Congo administration, Babembe and Babuyu were administratively divided into five sectors: Itombwe, Lulenge, Mutambala, Ngandja, and Tanganyika. Belgian colonial economic policies facilitated the migration of significant numbers of Banyarwanda cattle-herders into ostensibly "vacant" grassy regions from Rwanda via Uvira Territory. However, the Bembe largely refrained from exogamy and maintained a truculent and adversarial disposition toward Banyarwanda.

Despite successive waves of Arab-Swahili incursions, colonial domination, and the Mulelist rebellion, Fizi Territory witnessed, between 1937 and 1959, the arrival of numerous Rwandan refugees escaping unrest in their homeland. The question of Rwandan refugee transhumance (seasonal cattle migration) emerged on 21 September 1953, during a meeting at the Kakwela and Nakabunga mountains between Van Caester, Acting Administrator of Fizi Territory, and Jean Schwall, Assistant Administrator of Mwenga Territory. The Babembe of Fizi Territory and Itombwe (represented by Matayobo and Etongo) were in attendance, alongside Arille Guerlement. These Rwandan refugees, later identifying themselves as "Banyamulenge", were initially regarded as foreigners in Itombwe. Their population was estimated at 200 families, owning between 400 and 600 head of cattle. They were prohibited from residing or practicing transhumance within Mwenga Territory. Chief Matayabo of Lulenge consequently agreed to offer them asylum within his jurisdiction. In return, the Banyarwanda paid itolo (a traditional residence fee), typically in the form of cattle, to local customary chiefs. This arrangement remained in place until the 1980s. By 1986, however, these refugees ceased identifying as Banyarwanda (Rwandans) and adopted the ethnonym Banyamulenge, meaning "the people of Mulenge".

=== Interethnic and territorial disputes ===
The Basikasingo groupement, regarded as the stronghold of the Babuyu, has long been a focal point of conflict between the Babembe and the Babuyu. The groupement is inhabited predominantly, if not exclusively, by the Babuyu, and at the heart of the dispute lies a territorial boundary issue between Fizi Territory in South Kivu and Kabambare Territory in the Maniema province. During the colonial period, the Basikasingo groupement was administratively attached to the Babuyu sector of Kabambare Territory. However, in the postcolonial era, it was reassigned to the Lulenge sector, inhabited mainly by the Babembe. Since then, the Basikasingo (Babuyu) have persistently demanded their reattachment to the Babuyu sector in Kabambare Territory. This demand was formally and publicly voiced in 1997 before General Silvestre Lwecha, the special envoy of President Laurent-Désiré Kabila, who had been dispatched to mediate the crisis, though without tangible success. The Babuyu argues that governance and administration of this geo-administrative entity should rightfully be led by a native of their group, as political power has consistently remained in the hands of the Babembe, who occupy a larger portion of the area. Their demographic dominance grants them the opportunity and the advantage to maintain control, even through electoral processes, while the Babuyu continue to assert claims of ancestral sovereignty over the land. According to the Babuyu, the parts currently occupied by Babembe groupements within Lulenge do not belong to them, as the Babembe are said to have descended from the mountains to settle on land that the Babuyu could not entirely inhabit due to their smaller population size.

The conflict first took a violent turn in 1996 during the First Congo War, with the arrival of the Alliance of Democratic Forces for the Liberation of Congo (AFDL) in the region. The AFDL's forces, backed by Rwandan soldiers, faced strong resistance from the Babembe, who viewed them as foreign invaders seeking to occupy the lands of their ancestors. This period worsened a "climate of mistrust" between the Babembe and the Babuyu, the latter being accused of "being closely linked, if not outright allied, to the Rwandans". Empowered by the presence of Rwandan troops allied with the AFDL, the Babuyu took the opportunity to settle long-standing grievances. They accused the Babembe of encroaching on part of Lulenge that, according to their claim, belonged historically to the Babuyu. In expressing this, they invoked a phrase deeply rooted in Kibuyu, "Bagombi kùtùtùlo", meaning that the Babembe should return to the mountains from which they had come, referring to their supposed place of origin around Kilembwe, the administrative center of Lulenge. From that moment, both groups organized self-defense militias: the Parapongi representing the Babuyu, and the Mai-Mai fighters representing the Babembe. The first major clash between these militias occurred in 1997, when both groups encountered each other during a patrol to monitor their respective positions. The confrontation escalated into armed hostilities, resulting in three Babuyu militiamen being killed and forcing the survivors to retreat from Kilembwe to seek refuge in Kabambare Territory. The aftermath left Babuyu homes and properties destroyed and looted, in an apparent attempt to prevent their return. The Parapongi, however, soon retaliated. Supported by Rwandan soldiers of the AFDL and allied with the Mbote, they launched counterattacks against the Babembe, burning houses, both thatched and permanent, destroying churches belonging to the Babembe, and looting valuables. In response, the Babembe retreated to the mountainous outskirts of Kilembwe, where they sought refuge.

Documented incidents include: the 1997 assassination of Biloba, a traditional healer from the Babuyu, by Mai-Mai combatants in Kilembwe during the outbreak of the First Congo War; the murder of over seven Babuyu villagers in Mabango by Mai-Mai fighters that same year; and the killing of the Basikasingo chief, Tulungu Munyama, by members of his own community. Also in 1997, more than eighteen Babembe were reportedly massacred in the village of Kasacha by Babuyu militias. Many other unidentified victims died amid crossfire, malnutrition, lack of medical care, and the harsh conditions of displacement. Congolese scholar Bruno Thembo Amundala accentuates that, contrary to earlier interpretations, the Babuyu–Babembe conflict is not rooted in national identity but rather in territorial disputes.

=== Ongoing security problems ===
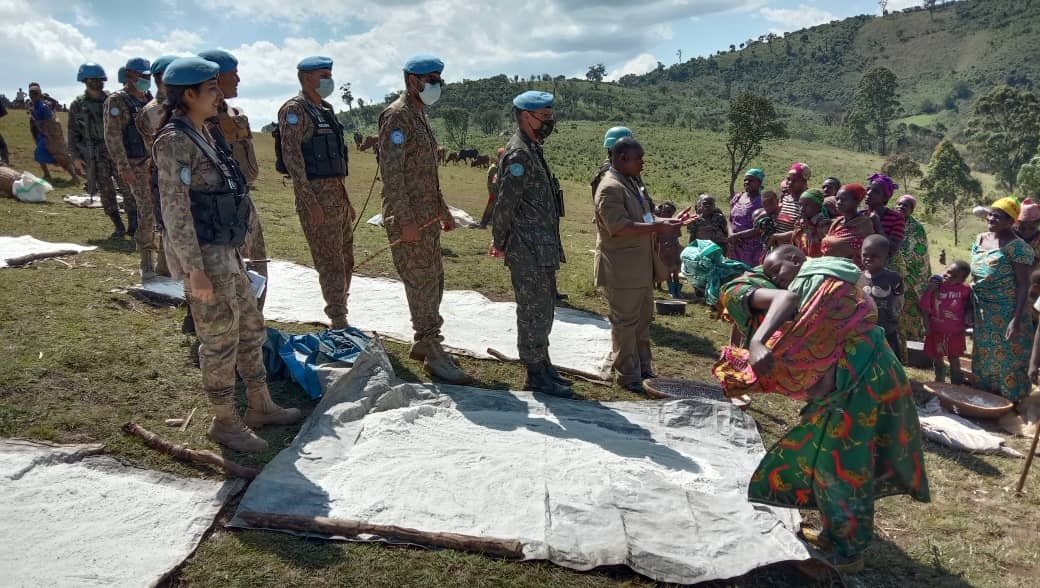
Displaced families seeking refuge in the Minembwe highlands.

In June 2020, two civilians were wounded by gunfire during an attack by alleged Democratic Forces for the Liberation of Rwanda (Forces Démocratiques de Libération du Rwanda; FDLR) rebels in the village of Kasolelo in Lulenge. Local sources ascribe the attack to FDLR, operating from the Hewa Bora forest. The assailants pillaged the possessions of the populace. In September 2020, approximately ten people were killed following three days of fighting between militia factions in the high plateau of the Fizi, Mwenga, and Uvira territories. The coalition of militiamen, including groups such as Android, Al-Shabaab, Twirwaneho, and Ngumino, was led by Rukundo Makanika at the stronghold of the Mai-Mai Mutetezi militia. According to civil society sources in Minembwe, located in Lulenge, 18 militiamen from the Makanika coalition were killed and 41 wounded, with the Mai-Mai Mutetezi also seizing livestock. At least 800 cattle were driven by the Mai-Mai Mutetezi towards Lulenge and the Itombwe forest.

In October 2020, the Twirwaneho, a rebel faction led by a Munyamulenge army defector, Colonel Rukundo Makanika, launched attacks on several villages in the Itombwe sector in the Mwenga Territory as well as in Lulenge. The villages of Tabunde, Kukwe, Kashasha, Ibumba, Abangya, and Ibulu were set ablaze, resulting in at least 20 fatalities. These villages belonged to Babembe and Bafuliiru. Consequently, the Mai-Mai of the Bembe, Fuliiru, and Nyindu communities engaged in clashes with the Banyamulenge until the latter were expelled from all the villages. In September 2022, an estimated 500 displaced households were relocated to Lulenge. These families fled the skirmishes between the Armed Forces of the Democratic Republic of the Congo (FARDC) and the Rwandan-backed rebel group, the National Resistance Council for Democracy (Conseil National de la Résistance pour la Démocratie; CNRD), in Hewa Bora.

In August 2023, the Rwandan-backed M23 insurgency was reported to be liaising with Twirwaneho in the highlands of Minembwe, as detailed in a report by United Nations Secretary-General António Guterres on the security situation in the eastern DRC. According to the report, these interactions heightened the risk that hostilities resuming in North Kivu could open a second front in South Kivu, potentially mobilizing previously inactive local armed groups in response to perceived foreign aggression. On the night of 1–2 October, the Twirwaneho attacked the headquarters of the 121st Parachute Battalion. On 3 September, Twirwaneho forces assassinated a soldier at the Union des Groupes d'Etudes et d'Actions pour le Développement de Fizi-Itombwe (UGEAFI), with his body discovered 48 hours later in the Lwiko River in Minembwe. The same Twirwaneho elements, under army deserter Colonel Charles Sematama, carried out another assassination at a joint guard post with the Police Nationale Congolaise (PNC) in Kakenge. Two first-class soldiers were killed, their weapons were taken, and their bodies were clandestinely disposed of to erase any traces. This pattern of attacks became recurrent. On 12 September, twelve members of Twirwaneho surrendered to FARDC's 12th Rapid Reaction Brigade in Minembwe, including two minors who were Colonel Sematama's bodyguards. They were handed over to MONUSCO for child protection, while the other 10 were transferred to the 10th military region in Bukavu. In December 2023, clashes erupted between FARDC's 12th Rapid Reaction Brigade and a coalition of Mai-Mai Yakutumba, Mai-Mai-Biloze Bishambuke, and RED-Tabara militias in several villages around Minembwe, particularly in Kivumu, Rutigita, Masha, Monyi, and Kabingo. Seven militiamen were killed, four were wounded, and the violence led to significant population displacement.
