= Nyanga =

Nyanga may mean:

- Nyanga Province, of Gabon
- Nyanga River, in Gabon and Congo
- Nyanga people, an ethnic group from Congo
- Nyanga, Zimbabwe, a town
- Nyanga District, Zimbabwe
- Nyanga National Park in Zimbabwe
- Nyanga, Western Cape, a township in South Africa
- Nyanga language (ISO 639/3 code nyj)
- Nyanga-li language (ISO 639/3 code nyc)

== People with the surname ==
- Gaspar Yanga (AKA Gaspar Nyanga), leader of a slave revolt in colonial Mexico
- Yannick Nyanga, French rugby union player
