= Buyi language =

Buyi language can refer to:

- Bouyei language
- Buyu language
