= Bigaragara mine massacre =

- Part of Kivu conflict
- Location: Bigaragara gold mine and village, Mutambala, Fizi Territory, South Kivu, Democratic Republic of the Congo
- Date: August 17, 2022
- Target: Civilians
- Deaths: 21
- Injuries: Unknown
- Victim: Many displaced
- Perpetrator: Twirwaneho

On August 17, 2022, Twirwaneho militants attacked civilians at the Bigaragara gold mine in Mutambala, Fizi Territory, South Kivu, Democratic Republic of the Congo, killing 17 people including women and children.

== Background ==
Rwandan-backed Twirwaneho militias are active around the Bigaragara gold mine, which is one of the most lucrative gold mines in Fizi Territory. In late 2021, Twirwaneho militants launched an offensive against the Congolese Army (FARDC) and self-defense militias in Fizi Territory. On August 15, a contingent of Burundian troops were sent to Ruzizi near Bigaragara to defend against Twirwaneho and other militia attacks. At the time of the massacre on August 17, the village of Bigaragara was supposed to be under FARDC control, but the soldiers had left the area.

== Massacre ==
Congolese authorities reported that Twirwaneho militants led by former FARDC commanders Michel Rukunda (Makanika), Charles Sebanyana (Sematama), and Mitabu Kivuzamigeri (Mituba) attacked the Bigaragara village and mine. Seven bodies were found in the mine on the day of the attack, and six bodies were found in the bush in the following days. Eight more were found charred in their homes. 414 houses were burnt down in the attack on the village. The Societe Civile des Hauts Plateaux de Milimba said that "scores" of internally displaced people fled the area.

== Aftermath ==
In October 2022, clashes broke out around the mine between Twirwaneho militant and Biloze Bushambuke Armed Forces (FABB) militants. These clashes displaced over 1,000 households.
