= Mulenge =

Village in Bafuliiru Chiefdom, South Kivu

- Village
- Location within Democratic Republic of the Congo
- Country: Democratic Republic of the Congo
- Province: South Kivu
- Territory: Uvira
- Chiefdom: Bafuliiru
- Grouping: Kigoma

Government
  - Chef de village: Ngengwe Masabire
- Time zone: UTC+2 (CAT)

Mulenge is a village encircled by hills in the Kigoma groupement, within Bafuliiru Chiefdom, located in the Uvira Territory, South Kivu, in the eastern Democratic Republic of the Congo. Perched on the Itombwe massif's high plateaus, it overlooks Uvira. Historically, the area has been inhabited by remnants of Bantu communities like the Fuliiru people whom are the original inhabitants of region, and some Nyindu communities. The region's economy is centered around agriculture, family livestock breeding, and fishing.

== Governance and administration ==
Mulenge is governed by a village chief (chef de village), appointed according to local custom and officially recognized by the Territory Administrator. The Kigoma groupement chief (chef de groupement) installs the chief in the presence of the Bafuliiru Chiefdom mwami. The village chief operates under the groupement chief's administrative authority. In 2016, Judith Verweijen identified Ngengwe Masabire as village chief.

== History ==
Mulenge has historically been inhabited by the Fuliiru people, who migrated from Lwindi (now Luindi Chiefdom) towards the present-day Uvira, and settled in the mountainous terrain. Congolese researcher Shimbi Kamba Katchelewa of the University of Montreal notes that Mulenge, along with Luvungi and Lemera, were key sites where the first Bafuliiru from Lwindi settled between the 10th and 14th centuries, forming the basis for the eventual establishment of a "kingdom" under a Hamba clan ruler. The Bahamba traditionally held authority in the area, with Lemera as their capital. Lemera itself was named after Mulemera, the father of Kahamba, the dynasty's founder. Historian Bishikwabo Chubaka indicate that the Bahamba clan's control extended across the northwestern Ruzizi Plain, from Uvira to Luvungi.

=== Interethnic and regional conflicts ===
By the 1920s, Mulenge began attracting Tutsi pastoralists searching for grazing land in the Itombwe Highlands. Scholars have characterized these migrants as foreign groups. René Lemarchand described them as "renegades from Rwanda", while Daniel P. Biebuyck stated that they migrated "from Rwanda via the territory of Uvira". In Mayhem in the Mountains: How Violent Conflict on the Hauts Plateaux of South Kivu Escalated, Judith Verweijen, Juvénal Twaibu, Moïse Ribakare, Paul Bulambo, and Freddy Mwambi Kasongo noted that these groups moved to present-day Uvira Territory from what is now Rwanda, as well as from present-day Burundi. Alfred Moeller de Laddersous, a colonial administrator known for his extensive studies on Bantu communities in eastern Belgian Congo, classified the Tutsi of eastern Congo as "Hamite invaders" and asserted that the Banyarwanda, as a broader ethnolinguistic group, were not the region's original inhabitants. He also observed that the Barundi of Uvira Territory were of Bahutu origin, having settled in the Ruzizi Plain between Luvungi and Kiliba before expanding northward between Luvungi and Kamanyola.

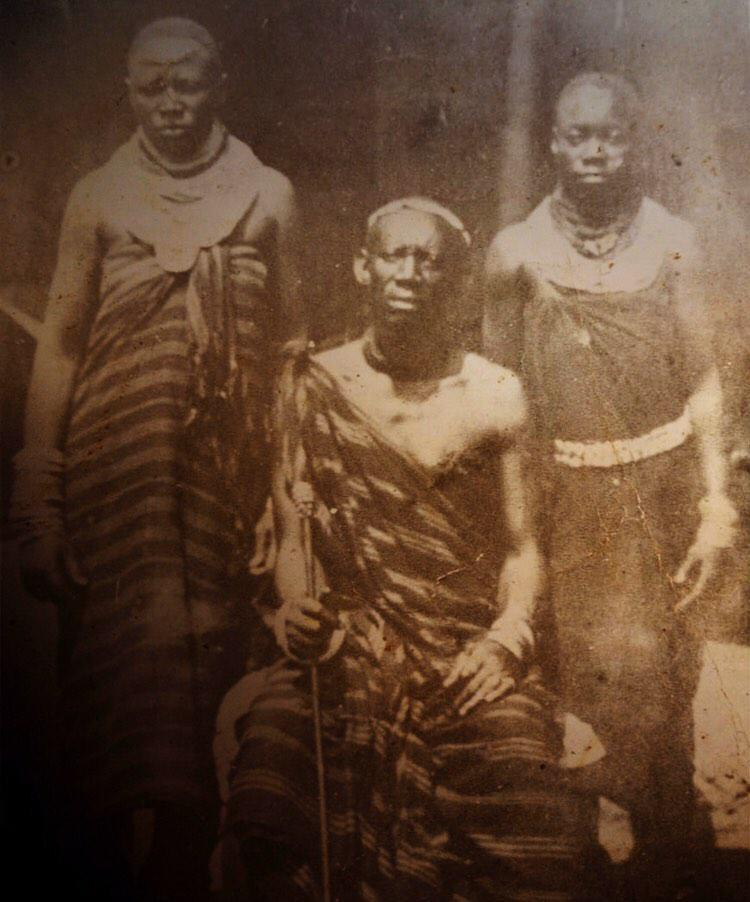
Mwami Nyamugira Mukogabwe II of Bafuliiru Chiefdom in Nia Magira (Lemera), circa 1925

Regarding the Tutsi pastoralists, the Fuliiru mwami, Nyamugira Mukogabwe II, granted them grazing land in exchange for livestock tributes. These pastoralists established settlements between Mulenge and the upper Sange River, subsequently ceasing their previous tributary obligations to the Rwandan monarchy. Mulenge became the immigrants' "quasi-capital, while the migrants began to be referred to as Banya-Mulenge". Tensions arose by 1924 when Mwami Mukogabwe's increasing demands resulted in the depletion of Tutsi cattle herds, prompting many Banyamulenge to migrate southward to Itombwe in search of isolation and better grazing land. These raids were not directed solely at Banyamulenge; wealthy Fuliiru cattle keepers were also among his victims. However, because the Banyamulenge generally maintained the largest herds, they were disproportionately affected and often became Mwami Mukogabwe's main targets. Paradoxically, this movement deepened their reliance on Fuliiru farmers for food, as cattle remained an essential part of Fuliiru bridewealth. The Fuliiru recall experiencing systemic marginalization in 1927, which fueled long-standing resentment toward the newcomers. After Mukogabwe's death in 1930, tensions persisted as Banyamulenge sought colonial intervention to facilitate their reintegration into Mulenge. Belgian authorities, sympathetic to their return, assisted in their resettlement.

On 25 February 1938, Mulenge was formally incorporated into the administrative framework of Uvira Territory under Ordinance-Law No. 21/91. It was designated as an administrative post alongside Makobola and Luvungi within Bafuliiru Chiefdom. While Banyamulenge were a culturally and linguistically distinct community, their eponym "never appears in colonial records", nor were they granted a chiefdom (collectivité), which left them politically disadvantaged in a system where ethnic administrative divisions shaped governance. During this colonial era, Belgian settlers built a police station in the village, and directly in front of it lay a football field, which served multiple purposes—a site for public whippings, and a marketplace for trading goods between villagers and settlers.

During the 1963–65 Simba Rebellion, which erupted across eastern Congo due to widespread discontent over post-independence governance, Banyamulenge suffered significant losses of their cattle. The rebellion, particularly in South Kivu, exposed ethnic divisions, as insurgents, drawn largely from the Bafuliiru, Bavira, and Babembe, targeted wealthy individuals, including those of Rwandan and Burundian descent. Amid increasing competition for land, the Bafuliiru, asserting their status as indigenous inhabitants, strongly opposed the continued presence of Rwandophone immigrants. The widespread loss of livestock forced some Banyamulenge to abandon cattle herding in favor of agricultural labor. By the early 1970s, economic relations between the Banyamulenge and the Fuliiru deteriorated. The Fuliiru, realizing they could obtain more cattle through market transactions rather than traditional exchanges, became less willing to supply food to the Banyamulenge. This shift further strained relations, as both communities felt economically disadvantaged by the other. Resentment over the events of 1964, particularly the loss of Banyamulenge herds, led them to side with President Mobutu Sese Seko's national army when it suppressed the rebellion in 1966. Since around 1976, some Tutsi immigrants began identifying as Banya-Mulenge, a designation that the Bafuliiru viewed as an attempt to obscure their Rwandan origins and stake a territorial claim. This longstanding dispute resurfaced during the First Congo War, when a substantial number of Banyamulenge fighters joined the Alliance of Democratic Forces for the Liberation of Congo (AFDL), participating in extrajudicial killings and acts of sexual violence against other ethnic communities. In October 1998, at the onset of the Second Congo War, the AFDL, with support from Banyamulenge, carried out numerous atrocities against civilians in Uvira. Many lost their lives to AFDL's violence, including the former Mulenge post chief, Ladislas Matalambu, who was killed on 1 October 1998, at 7:30 p.m., and Alexis Deyidedi, the former administrative secretary of the Bafuliiru Chiefdom, who was assassinated on 2 October 1998, at 11 p.m. Homes and businesses were looted, set ablaze, and destroyed.

=== Ongoing security problems ===
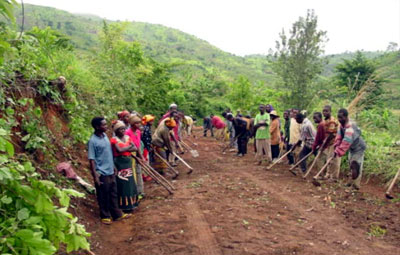
Mixed group of Bafuliiru and Banyamulenge repairing a road between Lemera and Mulenge, ca. 2003

On 10 June 2004, up to 3,500 Congolese, mostly Bafuliiru and Babembe, fled to Burundi, fleeing ethnic persecution. In 2009, the Armed Forces of the Democratic Republic of the Congo (FARDC) launched Operation Kimia II in South Kivu with the objective of neutralizing elements of the Democratic Forces for the Liberation of Rwanda (FDLR), a non-state armed group. As part of the operation, a FARDC battalion was deployed in Mulenge, where, by mid-August, intense clashes between the FDLR and government forces led to the displacement of much of the local civilian population to the nearby village of Mugaja. Due to severe food shortages, a group of displaced people, including seven women, one of whom was blind and two of whom were pregnant, attempted to return to Mulenge to harvest their crops. After their return on 18 August 2009, they were assaulted and raped by several FARDC soldiers, five of whom were later convicted of crimes against humanity by the military tribunal in Uvira on 30 October 2010 for their roles in the incident. On 2 July 2014, a Kitembe resident was killed in Kiriama, and a week earlier, another person was fatally ambushed by armed assailants in Kashengo while traveling on foot through the Bibangwa forest toward Mulenge. Local NGOs reported that FNL rebels and FDLR fighters were involved in supplying militias with firearms, including Chinese-made AK-47s, which were allegedly sold for $40 to $50.

On 16 January 2019, clashes erupted between Burundian rebel factions, including FOREBU, RED-Tabara, and the FNL, and other several Burundian militias. The conflict, which originated in Kabere, 20 kilometers west of Sange, spilled over into adjacent localities, including Mubere and Mulenge, resulting in at least 17 fatalities. By 22 January 2019, the coalition comprising RED-Tabara, FNL, and Mai-Mai Kihebe, commanded by Kihebe Ngabunga, was expelled from Kifuni village, where they had sought refuge on 20 January following their defeat in Mulenge at the hands of Burundian Imbonerakure militia, bolstered by Congolese Mai-Mai contingents. This coalition regained control of territories spanning Kabere, Mubere, and Mulenge in the middle plateaus of the Kigoma groupement. The skirmishes culminated in the deaths of five people, including four rebels and one Mai-Mai combatant, alongside injuries sustained by militia members. These hostilities triggered further displacement, with uprooted populations seeking shelter in school facilities and among host families, where they were deprived of fundamental necessities.

On 31 January 2019, civil society representatives and elders from the Bavira, Banyamulenge, Bafuliiru, Banyindu, and Babembe communities appealed to the United Nations Security Council to address the proliferation of Burundian and Rwandan armed groups in the DRC. By early February, the Burundian military commenced a phased withdrawal, dismantling RED-Tabara rebel strongholds. However, the Armed Forces of the Democratic Republic of the Congo (FARDC), deployed to secure the region, established unauthorized checkpoints in former rebel-occupied zones, where reports of harassment and extortion on market days emerged. On 21 February 2019, Kihebe Ngabunga surrendered to FARDC forces, accompanied by a cohort of approximately ten combatants, and relinquished two military-grade firearms. On 11 August 2019, the FARDC's 123rd Special Commando Battalion replaced the 3,304th Regiment in Lubarika, currently stationed in Nyamutiri (mid-plateaus) and Mulenge.

== Climate ==
In Mulenge, the wet season is hot, humid, and overcast and the dry season is warm and partly cloudy. Over the course of the year, the temperature typically varies from 62 °F to 86 °F and is rarely below 59 °F or above 90 °F.
