= Nyanga–Buyi languages =

Bantu languages, Zone D.40–50, reclassified as valid in 2003

Nyanga–Buyi
- Linguistic classification: Niger–Congo?: Atlantic–Congo; Benue–Congo; Southern Bantoid; Bantu (Zone D.40–50); Nyanga–Buyi

Language codes
- ISO 639-3: –
- Glottolog: None

Nyanga–Buyi are a pair of Bantu languages left after the languages of Zone D.40–50 in Guthrie's classification were reclassified. According to Nurse & Philippson (2003), they form a valid node.

Nyanga, Buyi
