= Mutambala =

Sector in the DRC

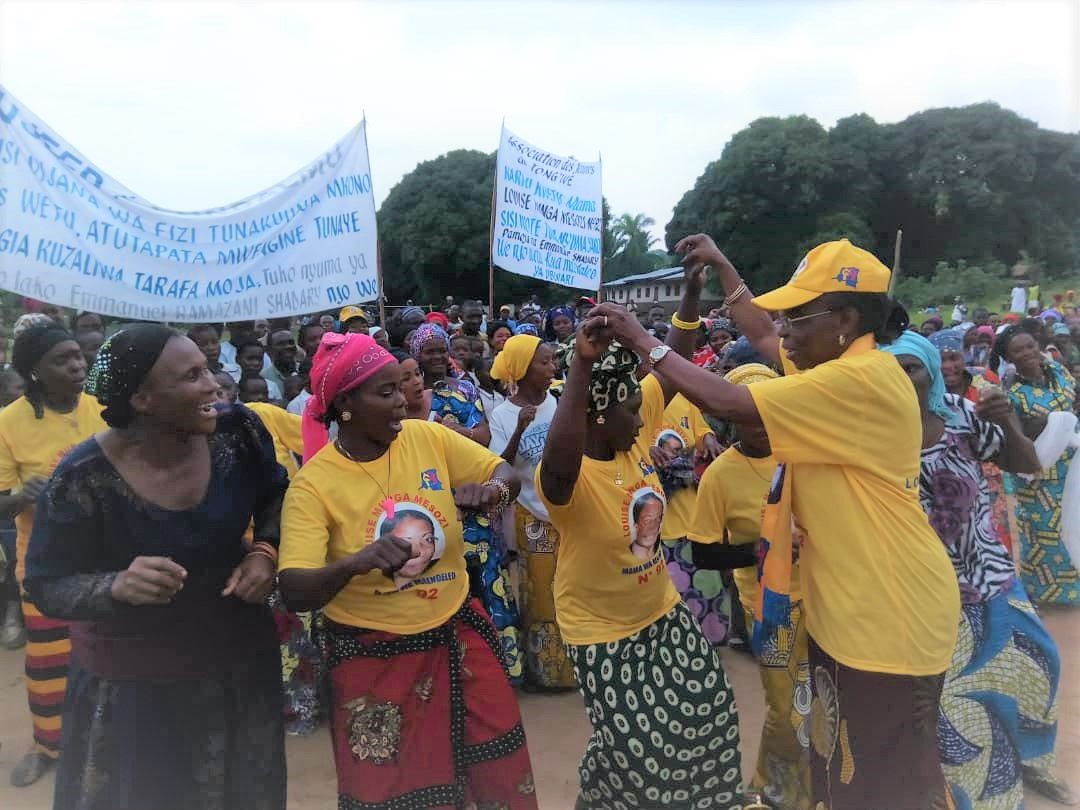
A large crowd of Babwari and Babembe women in the Mutambala sector celebrating Emmanuel Ramazani Shadary's 2018 presidential election campaign.

Mutambala (or M'tambala) is a sector that constitutes one of the four sectors in the Fizi Territory of the South Kivu Province in the eastern part of the Democratic Republic of the Congo. Mutambala is situated near Lake Tanganyika, in the west by the Lulenge sector, in the north by the Tanganyika sector, and in the south by the Ngandja sector. It has a surface area of 776 km 2. The sector consists of five groupings (groupements), including Basimukindje (in the center), Batombwe (in the south), and Babwari (in the east).

Agriculture is a significant economic activity in the region; it is revenue-generating for farmers. It is geared towards self-sufficiency but also generates profit through SOCODEFI, an agricultural organization that sells cassava to Baraka. Local food crops include cassava, palm oil, rice, maize, beans, banana, tomato, yam, peanut, sweet potato and sugarcane. In addition to agriculture, fishing constitutes another important source of income in the sector. It is practiced in Lake Tanganyika in traditional fishing (small canoes, hooks, small nets) and artisanal fishing (motorized canoes, fishing nets). Although fishing is a significant activity in the sector, there is no industrial fishing; men and women are involved in commercializing or selling fish in the market.

== History ==
The Mutambala was inhabited by the Mbuti people, who practiced hunting and food-gathering as an essentially nomadic way of life. Incidentally, the Bembe people were established in the region, which on several occasions was incorporated by the colonial administration in the territories of Fizi or Mwenga. There were also a small number of Lega, Babwari, Babuyu and Nyindu and small lineages established within the area. The Belgian colonial administration later established Mutambala as a sector alongside Itombwe, Lulenge, Ngandja, and Tanganyika.

In the mid-twentieth century, the region housed many cattle-herding Banyarwanda, who have been leading their herds towards Itombwe. The region experienced another influx of immigrants from Burundi in 1972 during the Great Calamity, a series of mass killings against the Hutu populace by the Tutsi-dominated army and government after the advent of Michel Micombero. Parenthetically, the region hosted a second wave of immigrants following the displacement of Burundians in 1976–77. The United Nations High Commissioner for Refugees and the Zairean government organized the influx of immigrants from the Ruzizi Plain to the Fizi territory in Mutambala sector.

== Security problems (1996 to present) ==
Since the First Congo War, Mutambala has been in the throes of conflict. Like the Uvira and Mwenga territories, the Mutambala sector has a reputation as a stronghold of armed groups. The Alliance des Forces Démocratiques pour la Libération du Congo (AFDL) took off from Fizi in October 1996 to overthrow President Mobutu’s regime on 17 May 1997. The insurgency conducted mass killings of Hutu refugees as well as Zairian civilians in Atanga, Baraka, Alùndja, Banyalinga, Alùlo, and Alèlè villages in the Mutambala sector. The forests and plateaus of Mutambala were for a long time the scrub of the head of the AFDL, Laurent Désiré Kabila.

In recent years, there has been an abundance of armed groups: FRF (Forces Republicaines Federalistes), RCD-Goma (Rassemblement Congolais pour la Démocratie-Goma), Ngumino, Twigwaneho and Red-Tabara. Reputed mono-ethnic and populated by the Banyamulenges, these armed groups have provoked a rebuttal in the leadership of other ethnic communities. Thus, each community, for its safety, has preferred to have its own armed group: Mai-Mai Malaika (Bangubangu), Mai-Mai Yakutumba (Bembe); Mai-Mai Biloze Bishambuke (Fuliiru and Nyindu); Mai-Mai Kibukila Mbilizi (Lega), Mai-Mai Yalinda (Bembe); the armed group Ebuhali (Bembe).

In April 2010, two civilians were reportedly robbed and seriously wounded by gunfire from armed groups in Mukera Kasonge, a town located 30 kilometers north of Fizi-center. On 23 March 2015, Mai-Mai faction of William Yakutumba attacked a FARDC (Forces Armées de la République Démocratique du Congo) military position in Lubishako, near the Ngandja forest. The attack resulted in three deaths, and the attackers also raped the soldiers' wives. In December 2017, two civilians were injured by gunfire in the village of Swima during a dispute between the local population and a FARDC soldier. In the nearby village of Kikwena, located near Baraka, a FARDC soldier was shot dead by suspected militiamen from Mai-Mai Yakutumba. This marked the third time in one month that FARDC positions were attacked in the villages of Kikwena and Lweba in the Mutambala sector. These bandits were identified as youths from the local community, who were known for engaging in robberies along National Highway 5. Previously, a FARDC response in these villages had been condemned by local civil society, which reported arbitrary arrests of the youths, some of whom were affiliated with Mai-Mai Yakutumba. Civil society also condemned an incident in Swima, where a confrontation between a school prefect and a drunken soldier escalated. After the soldier refused to yield the road, an argument ensued, drawing a crowd. In a fit of rage, the soldier opened fire on bystanders, injuring two people. The wounded individuals were evacuated to Bukavu by the ICRC, while the whereabouts of the soldier remain unknown. On 12 August 2020, clashes between Twirwaneho and Mai-Mai Ebuela in the Mulima region, located 90 km west of Baraka in the middle plateaus of the Mutambala sector, resulted in the alleged theft of 600 cows.

On 8 March 2022, Emerite Tabisha, the deputy mayor of Baraka, called on the local community of Baraka to live in cohesion with the other community of Bibokoboko in the middle plateaux of Mutambala. The ceremony was held at the Lumumba arena to bring together all social strata and promote peaceful coexistence in the middle plateaux of Bibokoboko. During the launch of this consultation framework, the Babwari, the Banyamulenge from the middle plateaux and the Babembe met in Baraka, five months after the Bibokoboko crisis. On 15 October 2025, armed men shot dead two women, a young woman in her twenties and her grandmother, in Kakungu village.

== Climate ==
The average temperature ranges from 21 °C to 24 °C to 54 °C, with maximum daily temperatures increasing, eventually during the dry season: 30 °C and 32 °C in September. Annual precipitation varies between 900 and 1200 mm depending on the location but still presents significant irregularities. The dry season, in addition, lasts five months on the coastal plain and in the mountains; it only lasts two months.
