= Lusenda refugee camp =

Burundian refugee camp

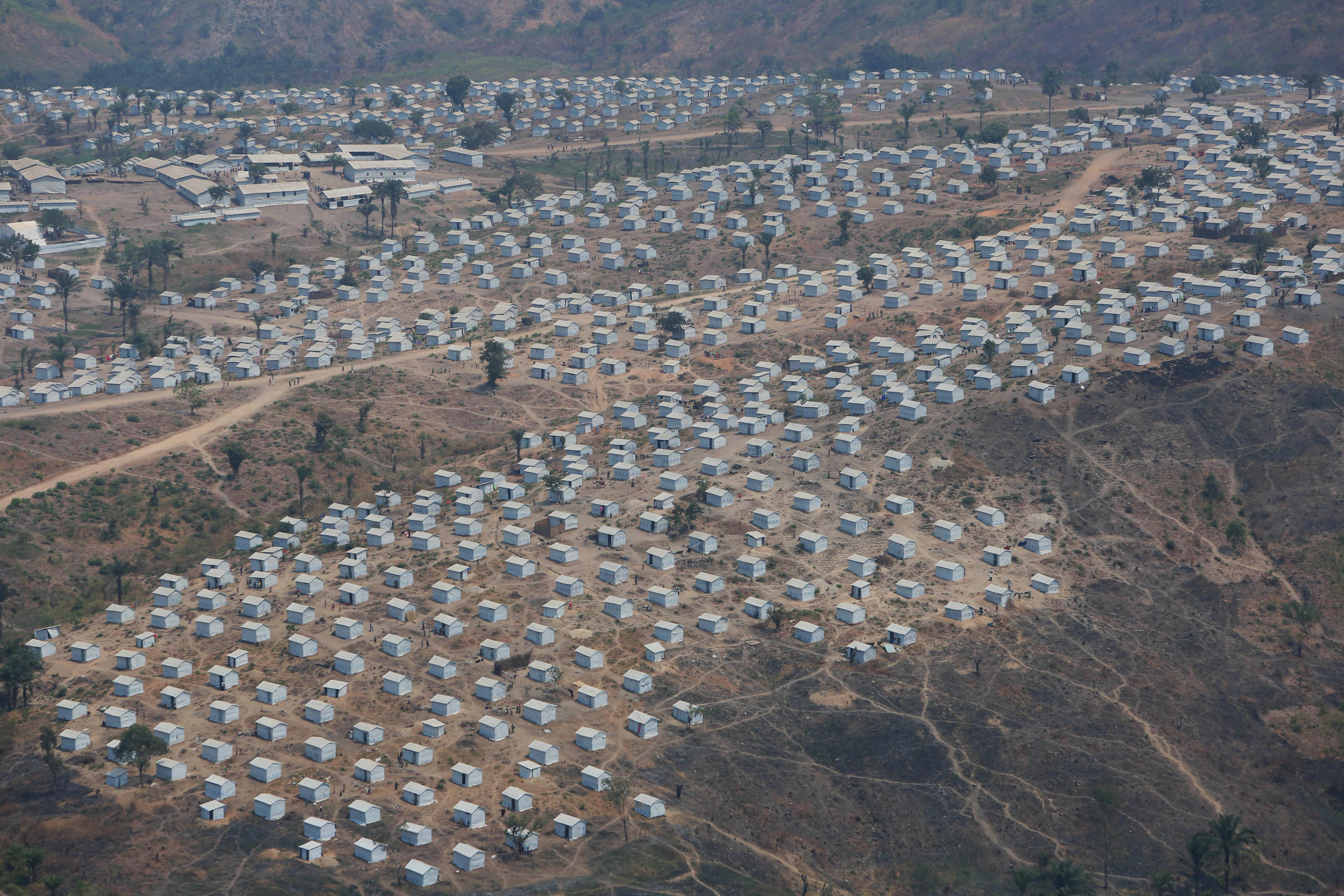
Lusenda refugee camp in 2015.

Lusenda Refugee Camp is a refugee camp established in 2015 for Burundian refugees, located in the Lusenda area of the Tanganyika sector, within Fizi Territory in the Democratic Republic of the Congo. The camp is managed by the United Nations High Commissioner for Refugees (UNHCR).

The establishment of the camp followed the outbreak of a political crisis in Burundi in March 2015, triggered by President Pierre Nkurunziza's controversial bid for a third term, which was widely contested by the opposition and initially regarded as unconstitutional. As a result of the ensuing unrest, the first official convoy of Burundian refugees entered Congolese territory on 1 June 2015. According to UNHCR reports, approximately 14,300 Burundians fled to the DRC as political refugees during this period. Lusenda Refugee Camp was created to host part of this refugee population. In 2015, approximately 7,000 people were living in Lusenda refugee camp. Refugees International reported in April 2016 that this number had increased to over 16,000 Burundians. By April 2018, UNHCR indicated that the camp was hosting more than 30,000 Burundian refugees.
