= Popular Forces of Burundi =

Rebel militia group in the DR Congo

- Forces Populaires du Burundi
- Leaders: Jérémie Ntiranyibagira; Edouard Nshimirimana
- Founded: Republican Forces of Burundi (Forces républicaines du Burundi, or Forebu)
- Dates active: December 2015–present
- Active regions: Fizi and Uvira territories, South Kivu, Democratic Republic of the Congo
- Ideology: Anti-Ndayishimiye
- Size: 300-500 members (2017)

The Popular Forces of Burundi (French: Forces populaires du Burundi, known by the acronym FPB) is a Burundian rebel militia, active in the eastern Democratic Republic of the Congo. Formed amid the political unrest in 2015, the group opposed the government of Pierre Nkurunziza and was referred to as the Republican Forces of Burundi (Forces républicaines du Burundi, or Forebu) until it was renamed in August 2017.

Forebu was formed on 23 December 2015 following a failed military coup against Nkurunziza's government in May 2015 and a subsequent period of unrest. The group recruited members from the ex-soldiers purged from the Burundian Army in the aftermath of the coup, many of whom had fled into the eastern Congo. Some recruits, however, were civilians from the Lusenda refugee camp. The majority of members were thought to come from the Tutsi ethnic group although a significant minority were Hutu. Forebu was led from its inception by Jérémie Ntiranyibagira and the groups administration was run by Edouard Nshimirimana. It is known to have been active in Fizi and Uvira territories in the Congolese province of South Kivu near the Burundian frontier.

Forebu previously collaborated with another Burundian armed rebel faction, Resistance for Rule of Law in Burundi (Résistance pour un État de Droit au Burundi, or RED-Tabara) and many of the group's members have subsequently defected to Forebu. It was also alleged that Forebu had received support from the Congolese government of Joseph Kabila and, possibly, also from Rwanda. In August 2017, Forebu announced its change of name as part of a wider re-organisation. Four senior leaders of the FPB, including Ntiranyibagira and Nshimirimana, were arrested in Tanzania in October 2017 and extradicted almost immediately to Burundi.

It was reported in April 2019 that the Armed Forces of the Democratic Republic of the Congo had launched an offensive against the FPB and the National Forces of Liberation (Forces nationales de libération, FNL) in Uvira Territory. 36 rebels were said to have been killed. Nkurunziza died shortly before his planned resignation from the Presidency in 2020.
