= Nyanga people =

Bantu people in the African Great Lakes region

Nyanga
Total population
- 150,000+ (1994 estimate)

Regions with significant populations
- Democratic Republic of the Congo

Languages
- Nyanga language (Kinyanga), Swahili

Religion
- Traditional African religion, Christianity

Related ethnic groups
- Nande, Hunde, other Bantu peoples

Nyanga
- Person: Munyanga
- People: Banyanga
- Language: Kinyanga

The Nyanga (also Banianga, Banyanga, Kinyanga, Nianga or Nyangas) are a Bantu people of the African Great Lakes region. They live predominantly in the Kivu region of the Democratic Republic of the Congo, near the frontiers with Rwanda and Uganda.

== Language ==
The Nyanga speak the Nyanga language (also known as Kinyanga), a member of the Bantu family.
