= Buyu language =

Bantu language spoken in DR Congo

Buyu
- Native to: Democratic Republic of the Congo
- Region: South Kivu–Katanga
- Native speakers: 10,000 (2002)
- Language family: Niger–Congo?: Atlantic–Congo; Benue–Congo; Bantoid; Bantu (Zone D); Nyanga–Buyi; Buyu

Language codes
- ISO 639-3: byi
- Glottolog: buyu1239
- Guthrie code: D.55

Buyu, or Buyi, is a Bantu language of Lake Tanganyika that is closely related to Nyanga.

== Former ISO coding problems ==
A "Bemba" language of South Kivu was listed in Ethnologue 17 as ISO code [bmy]. However, the name, Kinyabemba, is the language of the Banyabemba, one of the tribes that speak Buyu. (It is not the Bemba language of Zambia.) "Songa" [sgo] is another Buyu-speaking tribe rather than a distinct language. "Buya" [byy] is unidentified, but may be a typo for Buyu. The codes were retired in 2014.
