= Nyanga language =

Language from the Democratic Republic of the Congo

Nyanga
- Kinyanga
- Native to: Democratic Republic of the Congo
- Region: Kivu Province, Walikale Territory
- Ethnicity: Nyanga people
- Native speakers: (150,000 cited 1994 census)
- Language family: Niger–Congo?: Atlantic–Congo; Volta-Congo; Benue–Congo; Bantoid; Southern Bantoid; Bantu (Zone D); Nyanga–Buyi; Nyanga

Language codes
- ISO 639-3: nyj
- Glottolog: nyan1304
- Guthrie code: D.43

The Nyanga language (Nyanga: Kinyanga) is a language spoken by the Nyanga people in Kivu province, north-eastern Democratic Republic of the Congo. Speaker estimates range from 27,000 (Biebuyck & Matheene 1970) to 150,000 (1994 census). Many of the Nyanga speak Congo Swahili, the dominant regional lingua franca, as a second language. Nyanga is a Bantu language. Most of the (scarce) linguistic research conducted on Nyanga has been based on the materials published by Biebuyck and Mateene.

Nyanga literature is best known for the tales recorded by Daniel Biebuyck in 1956 and published in 1969 and 1970, including the Mwindo epic. This epic is titled after the main hero, Mwindo, a miraculously born Pygmy-like human being who possesses not only a magical sceptre but also the power of the word. It centers around Mwindo's travels and encounters during the search for his father. In other Nyanga tales, the dog often plays an important role as a mythical animal.
