= RED-Tabara =

Burundian rebel militia

Resistance for Rule of Law in Burundi
- Résistance pour un État de Droit au Burundi - RED-Tabara
- Leader: Melchiade Biremba (leader)
- Dates active: 2015 – present
- Country: Burundi
- Active regions: Democratic Republic of the Congo, primarily South Kivu
- Ideology: Pro-Tutsi; Pro-Rwanda
- Status: Active
- Annual revenue: Illegal mining of eastern DRC mines Rwanda
- Part of: Front for the Refoundation of the Nation
- Wars: Burundian unrest (2015–2018): Kivu conflict; M23 campaign (2022–present)

Resistance for Rule of Law in Burundi (French: Résistance pour un État de Droit au Burundi, Abbreviation: RED-Tabara) is a Burundian Tutsi rebel militia that was formed in 2015 in the wake of the political crisis in the country. The group opposes the political control of the National Council for the Defense of Democracy – Forces for the Defense of Democracy and former president Pierre Nkurunziza and is allied with a number of other opposition groups, including the Popular Forces of Burundi.

Since February 12, 2016, Melchiade Biremba has been the leader of the group. In an interview to Jeune Afrique, Biremba explained the goals of the organization:

[T]he motives which pushed us to take up arms are the same as those which pushed Nkurunziza himself to enter into rebellion in 1994: absence of democracy and justice, no rule of law.

— Melchiade Biremba, Burundi – Melchiade Biremba : « On ne peut pas défendre la démocratie avec des belles paroles »,

While many members of the group were former members of Alexis Sinduhije's Movement for Solidarity and Democracy, both Sinduhije and Biremba deny any connection between RED-Tabara and the party.

== Activities ==
According to reports from the UN Group of Experts, RED-Tabara was the recipient of logistical support from Rwanda, after recruits for the group were captured in South Kivu. The combatants claimed that they had been recruited from refugee camps in Rwanda and received training by people in Rwandan military uniforms.

During the 2015 Burundian unrest, the group engaged in attacks against the CNDD-FDD, and its youth wing, the Imbonerakure.

In November 2016, according to observers, RED-Tabara was the largest movement in terms of combattants, but the least operational.

However, by the end of 2016, support for the group appeared to decline. In August 2017, reports from the UN Group of Experts and Radio France Internationale that several RED-Tabara fighters had left the group and joined the Popular Forces of Burundi., On August 27, 2017, leader Melchiade Biremba was captured in the Congolese village of Rurambo and detained in Kinshasa.

Despite these issues, the National Defence Force (FDNB) and the Imbonerakure conducted several incursions into the Democratic Republic of Congo in 2021 and 2022 aimed at attacking the group.,

On December 23, 2023, the group claimed responsibility for an attack on the village of Vugizo which killed 20 people and wounded nine others.

In January 2024, Burundi closed all its land borders with Rwanda, for an indefinite period after Rwanda was accused of supporting the RED-Tabara.
