= Basile Chiefdom =

Chiefdom in Mwenga Territory, South Kivu

- Chiefdom
- Chefferie de Basile
- Country: Democratic Republic of the Congo
- Province: South Kivu
- Territory: Mwenga

Government
  - Mwami: Lucien Kalenga Riziki Lwango II

Area
  - Total: 2,113 km^{2} (816 sq mi)

Population (2022 est.)
  - Total: 140,352
- Time zone: UTC+2 (CAT)
- Official language: French
- National language: Kiswahili
- Website: Basile Chiefdom

The Basile Chiefdom (French: Chefferie de Basile) is a chiefdom located in the Mwenga Territory of the South Kivu province in the Democratic Republic of the Congo. It spans an area of approximately 2,113 square kilometers and had an estimated population of 140,352 in 2022. The chiefdom is bounded by the Ulindi River to the north, the Itombwe Sector to the south, the Luindi and Burhinyi Chiefdoms to the east, and the Zalya River and Wamuzimu Chiefdom to the west. Predominantly inhabited by the Lega people, whose wider communities extend into South Kivu, Maniema, and North Kivu provinces, the chiefdom is distinguished by acephalous social structures organized around institutions such as the Bwami and Bwali. Administratively, Basile Chiefdom is subdivided into ten groupements (groupings) and serves as the headquarters of Mwenga Territory and thus a centre of political and administrative activity.

The chiefdom's topography consists mainly of forests and wooded savannahs, except for areas such as the Banamochas groupement and part of the Bashimwenda, which are culturally linked to the Bushi, and the region supports biodiversity conservation through its inclusion in the Itombwe Nature Reserve. Swahili serves as the lingua franca alongside Lega, which are widely spoken locally. Basile Chiefdom is also notable for its mineral deposits exploited by artisanal miners, while its location near the Itombwe forest exposes it to insecurity linked to the presence of armed groups.

== Geography ==
The Basile Chiefdom is situated in the eastern DRC and borders Rwanda and Burundi. It is known for its diverse terrain, which includes lush hills, valleys, and plateaus. The chiefdom has a moderate altitude ranging from 800 to 1600 meters and features a predominantly flat plateau with expansive, gently sloping valleys. While the presence of mountains is limited and scattered throughout the area, Basile Chiefdom has underutilized forest cover, which encompasses two-thirds of its land. The remaining portion is adorned with verdant grassy vegetation.

=== Hydrology ===
The chiefdom is watered by the presence of several streams and rivers, among which the prominent ones include Kikuzi, Lulimunyu, Kyoka, Lushiga, Kilimata, Mwana, Kasitenge, Bilahile, Kizumbe, Namusindiki, and Zalya. These water bodies provide a critical source of hydration for the region. Incidentally, the rainy season brings a temporary and seasonal network of channels and ravines. These rivers also act as natural borders in the northwest, notably in the Itombwe sector. The considerable number of water resources in the area implies the potential for groundwater, including thermal springs.

=== Climate ===
The Basile Chiefdom, along with the entire Mwenga Territory, is situated in a hot and humid tropical zone, characterized by copious rainfall ranging between 1600 and 2200 mm per year. In the western part, the temperatures are high, while the eastern part enjoys a milder climate due to the moderating effect of altitude. The chiefdom experiences two distinct seasons. The dry season lasts approximately three months, from June to August. During this period, a dry and refreshing wind blows, accompanied by mild temperatures. Following the dry season, the region transitions into the rainy season, which spans around nine months, from September to May. The onset of the rainy season is heralded by heavy rainfall, often referred to as critical rains. The wind blows hot and humid, sweeping from east to west, and from south to north.

=== Geology ===
The area is marked by volcanic-derived soil originating from the basalt found throughout the Mwenga-Kadubo plateau. This natural soil is inherently rich in nutrients, but it has been depleted due to extensive leaching, which causes the mineral elements to be washed deeper into the ground. Beneath the chiefdom's surface lies a diverse range of minerals, including gold, cassiterite, coltan, and wolfram. These minerals play a crucial role in the region's geological makeup and provide a chance for mineral exploitation.

=== Administrative division ===
Basile Chiefdom is formally recognized as a Decentralized Territorial Entity (Entité Territoriale Décentralisée, ETD) in accordance with the Constitution of the Democratic Republic of the Congo, promulgated on 18 February 2006. The chiefdom operates under a hybrid governance model that integrates customary authority with decentralized state administration. At the apex of this structure is the Mwami (customary chief), who exercises traditional and statutory powers. The Mwami is selected based on customary succession norms and is supported in his duties by three Chief Aldermen (Notables), who assist in the execution of administrative and governance responsibilities.

The territorial boundaries of the chiefdom are established through a Prime Ministerial decree, issued upon the recommendation of the Minister of the Interior and Security, Decentralization, and Customary Affairs, and subject to approval by the Provincial Assembly. Internally, the administrative apparatus of Basile Chiefdom is composed of two principal organs: the Chiefdom Council (Conseil de la Chefferie) and the Chiefdom Executive College (Collège Exécutif de la Chefferie).

- The Chiefdom Council functions as the legislative and deliberative body. Its members, referred to as Chiefdom Councillors, are elected through direct and secret universal suffrage, in compliance with national electoral legislation. To safeguard their autonomy and integrity, councillors are entitled to fair remuneration. The council is led by an elected Bureau, consisting of a President, a Vice-president, and a Rapporteur, whose election is regulated by internal rules that may include gender equity provisions.
- The Chiefdom Executive College is responsible for implementing council decisions and overseeing the overall administration of the chiefdom. It comprises the Mwami and three Aldermen, appointed by the Mwami based on their competence, moral authority, and community representativeness. These appointments must be ratified by the Chiefdom Council. Although the Mwami is not formally accountable to the council, all his decisions must be co-signed by an Alderman, who bears full legal and administrative responsibility. In the event of the Mwami's death, resignation, incapacitation, or disqualification, the College of Aldermen assumes collective leadership until a successor is installed. Temporary leadership, in cases of absence or impediment, is delegated to the presiding Alderman.

Administratively, the Basile Chiefdom is divided into ten groupements (groupings or groups), which are further subdivided into 88 localités (villages). Each groupement is governed by a customary chief known as the chef de groupement, who serves as the Mwami's direct representative. These groupements are also partitioned into localités (villages), each led by a chef de localité (village chief), also appointed according to customary traditions.

==== Groupements ====
In 2018 the groupements of Basile Chiefdom were:

No.	Groupement	Groupement chief	Localités (Villages)
1.	Batumba	Ndavikwa Kamanya	Kinga, Kitamba, Kyamba, Buzinda, Kalungu, Nyangom, Kibili, Kibingo, and Miza
2.	Babulinzi	Zenon Lwesso Anyokwa	Bulinzi I, Bulinzi II, Kitundu, and Musika
3.	Bamulinda	Kabungulu Wilondja Mwati	Ilinda and Itinza
4.	Balobola	Mwagalwa Mundele	Kalugenge, Kalele, Tubindi, Kilamba, Kaboge, Kigondi, Katundu, Mukenye and Kibanda, Kakamba
5.	Bawanda	Katomotomo Kitungana	Mbobole, Tuseswa, Myamba, Kalambo, Lugumbo (chief village of Lugumbo), Powe, Kyunga
6.	Bashilubanda	Bashik'a Riziki Shawamitanda	Kyongu, Misela, Buziba, Lugoma, Kananda, Kibanda, Manyota, Kakulu, Bugambi, Muzombo, and Kishungu
7.	Bashitonga	Mukiga Sanza	Kabende, Sungwe-Center and Mukono
8.	Bizalugulu	Mukeswa Ndobano	Mutunda I, Mutunda II, Killigi, Misanya, Mawe I, Mawe II, Tulemba, Kibumba and Busawa
9.	Bashimwenda I Lyo'o	Jerome Kayaka	Mizulo, Munda, Kisongo, Mazimingi, Kasalalo, Kisubi, Kakozi, Kikindi, Ibenga, Lusenge, Ilombwe, Masumbili, Katonga, Miluba, Nyabale, Musimbi, Kabeba, Tubungu, Izabika, Kaganda, Kisanga, Mwabi
10	Bashimwenda Mayu	Zabangwa Ngoy Ya Mwati	Isopo, Kakamba, Nambo, Kitabi, Butezi, Musingi, Kanga, Kapanga, Isanza, Kasese, Kibungwe and Kisembe

Alongside the ten groupements recognized by the colonial administration, three others operated informally without legal personality. Of the thirteen groupements initially proposed by Mwami Kalenga, only ten received formal approval from the Ministry of the Interior and Security, Decentralization, and Customary Affairs. The clans constituting the three unrecognized groupements rejected integration into the approved structures and have since continued to assert their claims for independent recognition. One such groupement is Banamocha, which was integrated into the Balobola groupement. The Banamocha, identifying as Bashi from Walungu Territory, argued that their distinct history and customs set them apart from the Balobola, thus justifying their demand for a separate groupement. Their claim was not only cultural but also economic, as control over a decentralized entity like a chiefdom often generates local competition. Similarly, the Balimbizi have functioned in practice as an autonomous groupement, seeking separation from Bashilubanda despite shared kinship ties. Economic interests also drove their push for recognition. The Banenge, meanwhile, were administratively attached to the groupement of Bashimwenda I lyo'o but refused to conform, instead operating independently as a de facto groupement.

No.	Years	Mwami	Ref
1.	1913–1926	Kalenga Kishinga Kitoga	
2.	1926–1960	Kalenga Kyalumba	
3.	1960–2011	Kalenga Kalingishi Kitoga, Kalenga Kyalumba, Kalenga Lwango Charles, and Kalenga Bavon	
4.	2011–present	Lucien Kalenga Riziki Lwango II	

== Demographics ==
The chiefdom is predominantly inhabited by the Lega people, who are indigenous to the area. Alongside the Lega, there are migrant populations primarily originating from the Walungu and Kabare Territories, who are mainly engaged in trade and mining activities. Kiswahili and Kilega serve as the principal languages that facilitate communication among the diverse ethnic groups within the chiefdom.

Christianity is the most widespread religion in the region, with the majority of the population adhering to Roman Catholicism, as represented by the Sainte-Marie Parish of Mwenga. Several Protestant communities have also been established over several decades, including the 5th CELPA, the 8th CEPAC, the 40th CECA, the CMLCO (Methodist), and the Kimbanguist Church. Attempts by the Muslim community to settle in the area have historically been unsuccessful; however, with the deployment of the United Nations Organization Stabilization Mission in the Democratic Republic of the Congo (MONUSCO) in the eastern part of the country, mosques have been constructed in major population centers. Jehovah's Witnesses are present in the chiefdom, though in smaller numbers.

== History ==
Basile Chiefdom traces its origins to the colonial reorganization of the Barega lands. The initial attempt to recognize Basile as an autonomous administrative entity occurred in 1913, when colonial authorities created the "collectivity of Basile" and placed it under the leadership of Mwami Kalenga Kishinga Kitoka. However, this administrative arrangement was short-lived. In 1926, the Basile were merged with the Bakute to form a larger collectivity, Wamuzimu Chiefdom, under the leadership of Mwami Longangi Mpaga. The merger sparked discontent, as Kalenga and his supporters opposed subordination to Longangi, whom they viewed as a colonial appointee rather than a legitimate traditional authority. Kalenga's continued resistance led to two successive relegations: first to Rutshuru (in present-day North Kivu) in 1928, and later to Katako-Kombe Territory (in present-day Sankuru Province) in 1932, where he ultimately died. His duties were provisionally assumed by his son, Kalenga Kyalumba.

The creation of Mwenga Territory in 1949, with its headquarters established at Basile, also complicated the chiefdom's position. The establishment of the new territorial administration reduced Basile's influence and diminished local efforts to reinstate their suppressed collectivity. As Mwenga Territory developed into a colonial socio-economic hub, Basile leaders renewed demands for recognition, opposing the absorption of their identity within the broader Wamuzimu Chiefdom framework. Progress was made on 29 February 1960, when the councillors of Wamuzimu Chiefdom unanimously endorsed the principle of division, allowing groupement chiefs to align themselves with either Basile or Wamuzimu Chiefdom. Most opted to join the reconstituted Basile, although some, including Mwenga Kitambale of Bamulinda, chose to remain within Wamuzimu Chiefdom. This decision, viewed by many Basile leaders as an act of betrayal, led to the cession of part of their claimed territory to the Wamuzimu Chiefdom and worsened the inter-chiefdom tensions.

On 31 March 1960, shortly before Congolese independence, the Wamuzimu Chiefdom was officially divided by Decree No. 44/21.02.05.18, leading to the formal creation of the Basile Chiefdom. Mwami Kalenga Lwango, grandson of Kalenga Kishinga Kitoka, was appointed as its leader. For the Basile Chiefdom, this development marked the long-awaited restoration of a suppressed political identity; for the Wamuzimu Chiefdom, it signified a contested and imperfectly negotiated separation. The division also institutionalized boundary disputes that have persisted between the two chiefdoms. At its founding, the Basile Chiefdom comprised ten groupements and was conferred legal personality under Congolese law.

== Security problems ==
=== Boundary conflicts ===
==== The 1960 partition, and the Bamulinda and Babulinzi enclaves ====
The restoration of the Basile Chiefdom in March 1960, following its suppression and incorporation into the Wamuzimu Chiefdom in 1926, ignited tensions related to territorial boundaries. While some communities joined the re-established Basile Chiefdom, others opted to remain under the jurisdiction of the Wamuzimu Chiefdom. This ambiguous partition reinforced pre-existing disputes and created space for certain clans and groupements to declare themselves autonomous "enclaves". In this context, enclaves are defined as small, often clan-based, agglomerations that became administratively detached from their original chiefdoms and resettled within neighboring ones. These entities differ from conventional patterns of migration in that they frequently retain homogenous social compositions and emerge as a result of administrative boundary-drawing that disregarded traditional spatial and clan alignments. Such enclaves are often the product of environmental pressures (e.g., flooding from the Kibe River) or land scarcity, and typically entail disputes over land ownership and authority.

The Bamulinda groupement, aligned with the Wamuzimu Chiefdom and supported by Mwami Longani, claims boundaries defined by the Ulindi and Bilaile rivers and asserts territorial autonomy against the Basile Chiefdom. Conversely, the Basile Chiefdom authorities define the boundaries according to colonial-era legality and customary tradition, situating Bamulinda within the Basile Chiefdom's sphere and delineating its northern borders with the Shabunda Territory and Walungu Territory, its northeast border with the Luindi Chiefdom, and its southern border with the Itombwe Sector. In practice, Bamulinda is entirely landlocked within Wamuzimu Chiefdom and cannot establish independent external borders. Instead, the region comprises scattered villages such as Basimuko, Iganda, Kakangala, Kalole, and Kibaba, which are dispersed within the Basile Chiefdom. For the Wamuzimu Chiefdom, however, the boundary defined by the Ulindi River remains non-negotiable.

Another disputed enclave is Babulinzi, located within the Bizalugulu groupement. Strategically positioned, it hosts administrative offices and lies along National Road No. 2 (RN2), a major transport artery connecting Bukavu with Mwenga Territory. Historically, Babulinzi was under the administration of the Wamuzimu Chiefdom before 1960. After its refusal to integrate into the Basile Chiefdom, Babulinzi declared itself an enclave, aligning administratively with Bizalugulu while continuing to rely on Mwenga for customary arbitration. The enclave's population faces practical challenges due to its location, which is over three kilometers from the center of Mwenga Territory, requiring residents to travel considerable distances for administrative and customary services. This overlapping jurisdiction frequently gives rise to recurring disputes among the authorities of Basile Chiefdom, Bizalugulu, and Wamuzimu Chiefdom.

==== Enclaves generated by infrastructure projects ====
The construction of National Road No. 2, a major colonial and postcolonial infrastructure project linking Kasaï-Oriental to South Kivu, also contributed to the formation of new enclaves. Passing directly through the Basile Chiefdom, the works displaced entire populations, forcing them to settle in neighboring chiefdoms. Along the new route, heterogeneous villages emerged, populated by migrants from diverse origins seeking opportunities in agriculture, trade, and colonial employment. While these settlements benefitted from colonial investment and the surrounding socio-economic structures, they also created complex land claims. Formerly displaced groups continue to assert their rights over lands abandoned during road construction, resulting in overlapping territorial claims and land disputes rooted in competition for resources.

=== Armed groups ===
Although the Basile Chiefdom does not host its own indigenous militia, it remains severely affected by the activities of armed groups active in Mwenga Territory and neighboring regions. These groups regularly conduct incursions, engage in looting, and perpetrate acts of violence within the groupements of Basile Chiefdom, particularly in Bashimwenda I'yo'yo, Balobola, Bizalugulu, Batumba, Bawanda, and Bashimwenda Mayu. The insecurity has led to significant internal displacement, as populations migrate toward mining centers and urban hubs, such as Kamituga and Bukavu, in search of safety and livelihood opportunities.

The armed groups operating in and around Basile Chiefdom include various Mai-Mai factions and Raiya Mutomboki cells. In July 2010, approximately 60 people were reportedly taken hostage by alleged FDLR fighters in Kagulu, a location situated between Isopo and Kamituga in the Bashimwenda groupement. On 12 August 2011, the FDLR attacked the Lukatu quarry, located 35 kilometers northeast of Kamituga. According to civil society in Kamituga, two people were reported dead, and several diggers were reported missing. The locality of Lukatu was looted, and a man was shot dead. The assailants then kidnapped and cut the throat of the head of the Tubindi Sele locality near Ngando in the Balobola groupement. On 27 September 2011, five people were reportedly killed in the locality of Mukono in the Basile Chiefdom. According to local authorities, the attackers slit their throats and left them lying on the floor.

A 2024 mapping exercise identified seven principal factions affecting the area:

No.	Name of group	Leaders	Territorial control
1	Mai-Mai Ruma	Ruma Honda	Lwindi Chiefdom (Kigogo Grouping)
2	Mai-Mai Ny'Ikiriba	Kabeza Bagara	Lwindi Chiefdom (Groupings of Kigogo and Kibumba, Central Mwenga)
3	Mai-Mai Mupekenya Kaji	Mupekenya Kaji	Itombwe Sector (Basimukindji Grouping: Maheta, Magunda, and Nyakirango)
4	Mai-Mai Namunjira	Namunjira	Mwenga
5	Mai-Mai Nguvu za Milima	Aluma	Itombwe Sector
6	Raiya Mutomboki Idanda Wabenga	Ibanda Wabange Sukari	Itombwe Sector (Tukulu), Chiefdom of Wamuzimu
7	Mai-Mai Maja	Kitwa Maja	Lwindi Chiefdom (Kigogo, Muhuzi)

In addition to these groups, the Basile Chiefdom is affected by militias based in neighboring areas, including Nguvu za Milimani, Mai-Mai Bulangi, and Raiya Mutomboki Ibanda. Occasionally, commanders from these militias establish temporary bases within mining concessions in the Basile Chiefdom. For example, a leader from Raiya Mutomboki briefly occupied a mining site at Kikwilu in Bashimwenda I'yo'yo. Many of these militias originate from the Shabunda Territory, Walungu Territory, or the Itombwe Sector, with their activities having a direct impact on the chiefdom. Attacks in Bizalugulu, for example, have been attributed to armed groups from Bamunguba Nord in the Shabunda Territory, often commanded by leaders of non-Barega origin.

==== The emergence of Wazalendo ====
Basile Chiefdom became a focal point of Wazalendo, a movement of so-called "patriotic resistance" fighters that gained momentum during 2023–2024. Central to this development is the warlord Nyi'Ikiriba, originally from the Lwindi Chiefdom, who abandoned guerrilla warfare and re-established himself in the Basile Chiefdom, where he proclaimed himself "General". From this new base, he undertook the registration of Wazalendo fighters across the territories of Fizi, Mwenga, and parts of Shabunda. Although Nyi'Ikiriba received a degree of official recognition from Kinshasa, his authority remains contested by rival commanders, resulting in the fragmentation of the Wazalendo movement into multiple factions. At least three of these now operate within Basile Chiefdom: the Aluma faction (known as Nguvu za Milimani), which maintains a presence in the Itombwe Sector; the Ibanda Wabange Sukari faction (Raiya Mutomboki), which persists in exerting influence across Mwenga Territory and Wamuzimu Chiefdom; and the faction loyal to the self-proclaimed General, based directly in Basile Chiefdom. Each Wazalendo faction maintains its own armed units, which operate alongside the Congolese army (FARDC) and the Congolese National Police (PNC).

== Economy ==
=== Agriculture and livestock ===
Traditionally, the Basile Chiefdom's economic base primarily relies on subsistence agriculture and livestock rearing. Land tenure historically followed the principle of the "first occupant", which conferred usage rights without strict clan ownership. During the colonial period, industrial agriculture was introduced, with plantations of cinchona, tea, coffee, and cocoa supplying processing industries in Bukavu, notably Pharmakina and the Office du Café. Most of these cash crops have since disappeared, although oil palm cultivation has persisted and remains a part of the local economy.

Palm oil production is particularly significant in the groupements of Balobola, Bashimwenda Mayu, and Bashitonga, where it is marketed locally and in Kankinda, Walungu Territory. Production is constrained by aging plantations and a lack of modern processing facilities, with farmers relying on rudimentary techniques such as manual pressing (munyonza). Despite these limitations, palm oil remains a key trade good, alongside agricultural surpluses from Kitutu (Wamuzimu Chiefdom) that are transported via Bukavu to Goma and, in part, exported to Rwanda through the petite barrière. In recent years, cocoa cultivation has been revived, particularly among smallholder farmers working in partnership with economic operators based in Goma.

=== Fishing ===
Basile Chiefdom inhabit one of the rainiest regions of Mwenga Territory, where rivers and streams such as the Bilalé, Bilinga, Kikuzi, and Zalya provide considerable potential for aquaculture. Fish farming has been actively promoted, with the royal family playing a central role in the construction of ponds. A 2014 survey by the agricultural inspectorate identified 13,500 dam ponds in the region, of which 4,515 were functional, while current estimates (2023–2025) place the number of ponds at over 1,500. These ponds, typically covering 20 to 30 ares, can yield up to 30 kilograms of fish per harvest.

=== Mining ===
Basile Chiefdom has deposits of gold, coltan, cassiterite, wolframite, and other strategic minerals, with principal mining sites concentrated in the groupements of Bizalugulu, Bashimwenda Mayu, Batumba, Bashilubanda, Bashimwenda I, and Bawanda. Beyond these officially recognized areas, mining also extends illegally into the Itombwe Nature Reserve, where artisanal diggers exploit coltan, gold, and cassiterite in defiance of conservation regulations. Mining is overwhelmingly artisanal in character, providing minimal improvement in living conditions and offering few tangible gains for local populations. Mining operations by groupement:

No.	Groupement	Site location	Resources exploited
1	Batumba	Muliza, Tende, and Lusolo	Cassiterite and gold
2	Bawanda	Powe and Kyunga	Cassiterite, gold
3	Bashilubanda	Kakulu, Kishingu	Cassiterite
4	Bizalugulu	Kakanga-Kigalama	Cassiterite
5	Bashimwenda I	—	Cassiterite and gold
6	Bashimwenda Mayu	Itabi, Lukata, Bikolongo, Lubyolo, and Makalapongo	Cassiterite and gold

The sector is formally structured around cooperatives operating under the supervision of the Service d'Assistance et d'Encadrement du Small-Scale Mining (SAEMAPE). Six cooperatives dominate the field: the Coopérative Minière de Mwenga (COOMIM), Coopérative Minière pour le Développement de Mwenga (COOMIDEM), Coopérative Minière Tuungane (COOMITU), Société Coopérative Minière de Bikolongo (SOCOMIB), Société Coopérative Minière de Karanga (SOCOMK), and Coopérative Minière pour la Promotion des Exploitations Artisanales de Salya (COMIPEAS-SCOOPS). In practice, these entities compete for control over mining squares and are widely criticized for being trader-driven organizations rather than miner-led initiatives. As a result, artisanal diggers remain marginalized and poorly compensated, while profits are largely captured by traders and processing companies.

A major challenge for the chiefdom is the absence of a recognized trading center, which results in minerals extracted in Basile Chiefdom being routed to Bukavu, often under the guise of the Mugogo trading center in Walungu Territory, or smuggled through Bujumbura and Rwanda via opaque channels. When marketed via Mugogo, the output is officially attributed to the Ngweshe Chiefdom. Even if the Basile Chiefdom were to establish its own trading hub, effective traceability of mineral flows would remain elusive due to the dominance of a predatory mining economy. Gold extraction is divided among artisanal diggers, clandestine Chinese operators, and a handful of cooperatives, while the so-called "3TGS" minerals—cassiterite, wolframite, and coltan—dominate the sector but are frequently accompanied by smuggling. Coltan, in particular, is transported in 25-kilogram sacks on bicycles and motorbikes to Bukavu, where it disappears from traceability systems. Despite the region's productive potential, the Basile Chiefdom remains tied to external supply chains centered on Bukavu, Rwanda, and Uganda. Agricultural products such as flour and peanuts, which were once cultivated locally, are now largely imported from Rwanda. Meanwhile, frozen and salted fish arrive from Uganda and Tanzania, while beef is imported from other regions.

== Infrastructure ==
The primary transportation artery traversing the Basile Chiefdom is National Road No. 2, which links Bukavu to Kasongo in Maniema Province, passing directly through the chiefdom. Access to the remainder of the chiefdom is predominantly provided by rural tracks, which serve to connect the chiefdom's administrative center with various groupements and villages. Several areas within the chiefdom remain accessible only by foot or motorcycle. Historically, many of these agricultural access roads were in a state of significant disrepair; however, rehabilitation efforts have been undertaken in recent years. The total length of agricultural access roads within the Basile Chiefdom is estimated at 170 kilometers.

Route	Approximate distance (km)
Kibumba – Ngando	22
Sungwe – Makalapongo – Isopo	40
Mwenga – Kitamba	6
Mizulo – Kiya	135
Bilalombili – Mizulo	10
Kakanga – Isopo – Kalumba	60
Kalole II – Masango	4
Myamba – Mbobole	8

The Basile Chiefdom is served by cellular networks operated by Airtel (formerly Zain), Vodacom RDC, and Orange RDC. These telecommunications providers offer coverage across a substantial portion of the chiefdom.

== Culture ==
The family constitutes the fundamental social unit within the Basile Chiefdom, as is typical in human societies. Consistent with broader cultural practices in the eastern Democratic Republic of the Congo, the Basile Chiefdom operates under a patriarchal system, whereby children born within a marriage belong to the husband's family. Historically, polygamy was widely practiced; however, the spread of Christianity and rising living costs have contributed to a gradual shift toward monogamy.

Early childhood education primarily takes place within the family through frequent interpersonal interactions. Boys traditionally gather with elders in initiation houses, known locally as Lubunga or Lusu, where they are instructed in customary practices. Starting at approximately seven years of age, much of their cultural education is imparted through the Bwali initiation rite of the Lega people, which involves a seclusion period of two or more months in the bush, accessible only to those who have already been initiated. Girls receive their education under the guidance of elder women responsible for their upbringing.
