= Kalenga Riziki Lwango II =

Kalenga Riziki Lwango II was born in Kamituga, Democratic Republic of the Congo on 2 July 1974. He is the ruling King (Mwami) of Chefferie des Basile since his enthronement in 2011. He is from the Alenga dynasty, which reigns over the eastern Lega people.

== Early life and education ==
He did his primary and secondary studies in the city of Kinshasa, respectively at the Sainte Thérèse school in Kinshasa (TENAFEP 1986) and at the Institut du 24 Novembre (State diploma in 1992). Holder of a bachelor from the Free University of the Great Lakes Countries (2000), he completed his academic studies at the Official University of Goma (2003) at the Faculty of Law.

== Political life ==
He was Minister of Public Works in the provincial government under the Governor Marcellin Chishambo and at the same time Minister in charge of Relations with the provincial hemicycle in June 2013. As Minister he fought for Bukavu to become the Switzerland of Africa again. Member of the parliament elected in 2006 elections, he also occupied the position of President of the Political, Administrative and Judicial Commission in the Provincial Parliament from 2006 to 2013.

As Mwami, he has initiated several development projects and is working hard to open up his chiefdom, fight against Ebola outbreak. He also leads a tireless fight against insecurity in the territory of Mwenga.

== Private life ==
Kalenga Riziki Lwango II Lucien is married to MP Moza Kalafula and father of several children.
