= Kayuyu =

- Location within Democratic Republic of the Congo
- Coordinates: 3.6523°S 26.36608°E
- Country: Democratic Republic of the Congo
- State: Maniema
- Territory: Pangi Territory
- Sector: Wakabango 2
- Time zone: UTC+2 (Central Africa)

Kayuyu is a settlement in Maniema province, Democratic Republic of the Congo.

== Location ==
Kayuyu is in the Pangi Territory of Maniema province. Kayuyu is capital of the Wakabango 2 sector. It is 109 kilometres (68 mi) from Kindu. Pangi Territory is mostly occupied only by Lega people. In May 1999 a Mai-Mai resistance force including Lega groups from Kayuyu, Kampene and other towns threatened Kindu.

The Köppen climate classification is Aw : Tropical savanna, wet. Pangi territory has a subequatorial climate characterized by the alternation of two seasons. The rainy season lasts from the end of September to the end of July, and the dry season from the end of July to the end of September. Temperature varies between 25 and 30 °C (77 and 86 °F).

In March 2021 a citizens' group accused the head of Wakabango 2 of selling state land in Kayuyu to private citizens. He denied the charges.

== Roads ==
The RN31 highway runs from Kindu to the north through the town to Kasongo to the south. It is joined in the town by the RS1122 highway from Kampene to the east. Kampene is a center for informal artisanal gold mining. The Kayuyu–Kampene road often floods during the rainy season and prevents villagers reaching markets and health facilities. On 3 May 2013 the Comité de développement Ibaibawub de Kavula (Codibakav) launched a four-month program to rehabilitate the road between Kampene and Kayuyu. This would help transport of food between the villages along the road.

== Sources ==
- Berman, Bruce; Eyoh, Dickson; Kymlicka, Will (2004), Ethnicity and Democracy in Africa, Ohio University Press, ISBN 9780821442678
- Biebuyck, Daniel P. (1973). Lega culture; art, initiation, and moral philosophy among a Central African people. University of California Press. ISBN 0-520-02085-5.
- Democratic Republic of the Congo (image caption: Kayuyu-Kampene Road, Maniema Province, eastern DRC, May 2013), UN OCHA
- "Kayuyu, Province du Maniema, Democratic Republic of the Congo", Mindat.org
- "Maniema : réhabilitation de l'axe routier Kampene-Kayuyu", Radio Okapi, 6 May 2013
- "Node: Kayuyu (1156635200)", OpenStreetMap
- presse acp (18 March 2021), Maniema : la spoliation des terrains de l'Etat dénoncée à Kayuyu dans le secteur de Wakabangu 2 (in French), ACP
- Territoire de Pangi, CAID
- The Kampene Gold Pilot, Maniema, DR Congo – Fact Sheet (PDF), coopération allemande
