= Pangi =

Pangi may refer to:

== Geography ==
Democratic Republic of the Congo

- Pangi, Democratic Republic of the Congo, a community in Maniema province
- Pangi Territory, a territory in Maniema province, Democratic Republico of the Congo

India

- Pangi Valley, a remote valley in Himachal Pradesh
- Panaji, a city in Goa

Iran

- Pangi, Iran, a village in Razavi Khorasan Province, Iran
- Pangi, East Azerbaijan, a village in East Azerbaijan Province, Iran

Malaysia

- Tenom Pangi Dam, a hydroelectric plant in Tenom, Sabah, Malaysia

Vanuatu

- Panngi, a large village in south-western Pentecost Island, Vanuatu

== Other uses ==
- Pangi (Maroon), the name used by the Maroon people of Suriname for a type of cloth, and also for a wrap that may be made from this cloth
- Pangi (fruit), the "football fruit" of the tree Pangium edule.
