= Itombwe Nature Reserve =

Protected area in the Democratic Republic of the Congo

- Location within Democratic Republic of the Congo
- Location: South Kivu, Democratic Republic of the Congo
- Coordinates: 3°39′57″S 28°01′03″E
- Area: 6,009.1 km^{2} (2,320.1 sq mi)
- Designation: Nature reserve
- Designated: 2006
- Governing body: Institut Congolais pour la Conservation de la Nature

The Itombwe Nature Reserve is a protected area in the eastern Democratic Republic of the Congo, straddling the Uvira, Fizi, Mwenga, and Shabunda territories. Covering an area of approximately 6,009.10 square kilometres (2,320.13 mi^{2}), the reserve forms part of a designated Lion Conservation Unit and is recognized for its biodiversity, particularly within the Itombwe Mountain massif. This mountainous region is characterized by high-altitude forest ecosystems that serve as critical habitat for various flora and fauna, including several primate species such as the endangered eastern lowland gorilla (Gorilla beringei graueri).

The reserve was officially established by the national government in 2006, following a conservation initiative that began in 1998 with the aim of safeguarding the region's ecological integrity. However, the initial declaration lacked clarity regarding the reserve's exact boundaries and the types of land use permitted within it. At the time of its establishment, the reserve encompassed an estimated 760,000 hectares (7,600 km^{2}). Local communities living near the reserve expressed concerns that its protected status conflicted with their traditional livelihoods and land use practices. In response to these concerns, a participatory boundary revision process was initiated, culminating in Provincial Decree No. 16/026/GP-SK on 20 June 2016, which redefined the reserve's boundaries and land use zones in consultation with local stakeholders but was not formally validated by the central government. The revised management framework established three distinct zones within the reserve: a conservation zone for wildlife with no human activity permitted; a multiple-use zone that allows limited human activities and sustainable resource extraction; and a development zone that includes villages where sustainable development projects are encouraged.

== Ethnic groups ==
The area is also home to six main ethnic groups: the Babembe in the south, the Bafuliiru and the Bavira in the east, the Bashi and the Banyindu in the north, and the Banyamulenge and Babembe in the center.; the Barega (Basile Chiefdom) occupies the western edge.

== Challenges ==
The multiple-use zone has been the most problematic. Populations retain access to this area, with some even residing within its limits. The discovery of cassiterite deposits in the zone attracted mining operators that clashes with conservation efforts. Artisanal miners have cleared large sections of forest, while logging for tunnel supports and consumption has destroyed important timber species. Wildlife, including protected species, is also hunted for food.

Mwenga Territory is densely forested, and timber extraction has historically been a key component of its economy. Logging is particularly intensive in the Basile Chiefdom, where wood is widely employed in artisanal mining, especially to reinforce underground tunnels. Numerous studies have raised concerns about the unsustainable exploitation of forest resources, pointing to significant risks of environmental degradation and ecological imbalance. Exploitation of the Itombwe Nature Reserve persists outside legal frameworks of conservation law, driven by some local chiefs, armed groups, and mining operators. Community-managed forests are also increasingly subject to deforestation, with timber being cut into planks and transported via road networks to Bukavu and then to Goma.

In response, the environmental NGO Strong Roots has engaged with local communities to promote biodiversity conservation through participatory approaches and has assisted in obtaining official recognition for community-managed forest concessions; four such concessions have been legalized within the Basile Chiefdom, including Yi été Bingi for the Balobola, Lugulu for the Bizalugulu, Asu'u for the Bashimwenda, and Seeéle for the Banamocha.
