= Ulindi River =

River in Democratic Republic of the Congo

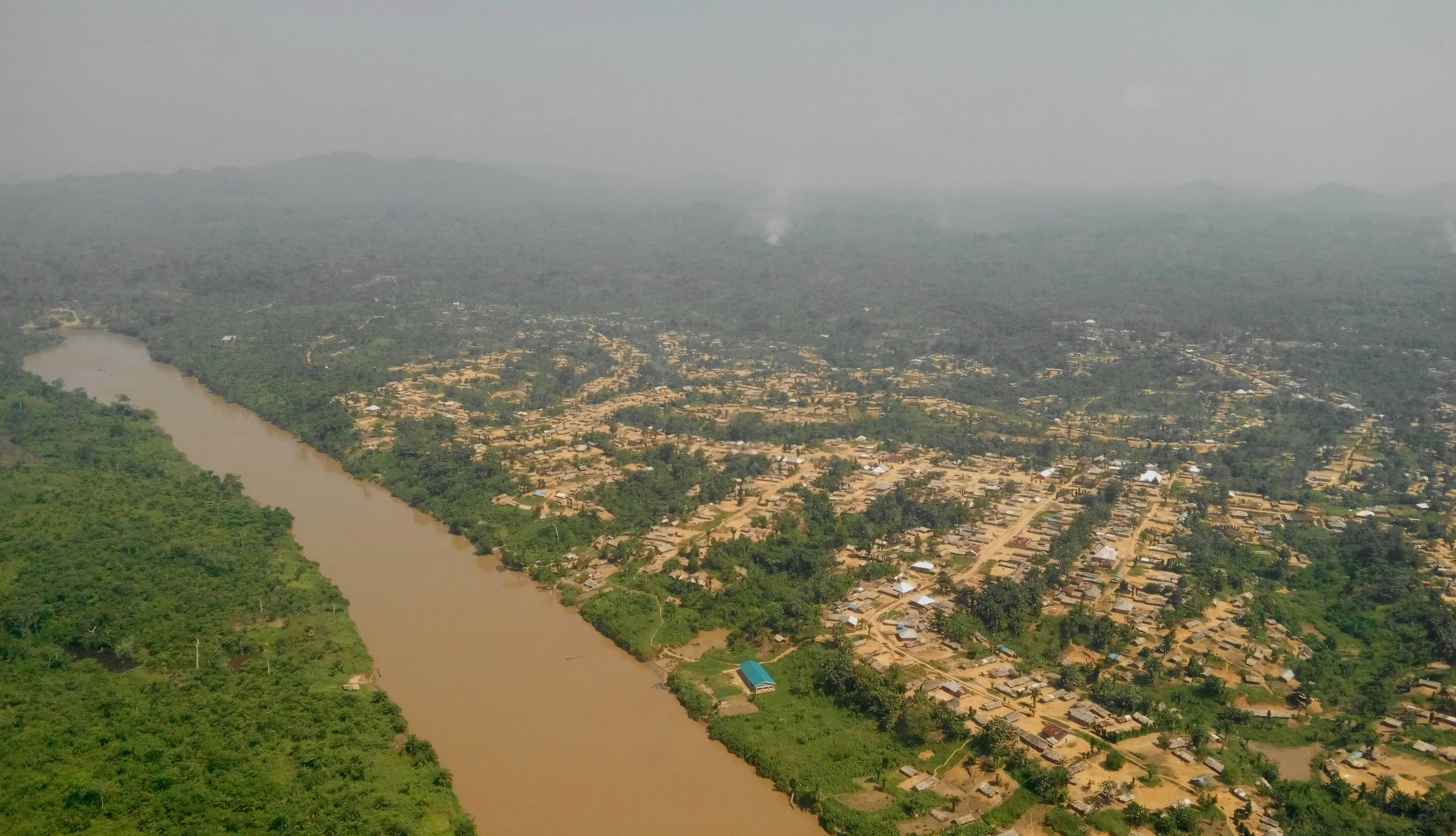

- The Lualaba River, in red. The Ulindi enters from the east to the north of Kindu.

Location
- Country: Democratic Republic of the Congo

Physical characteristics
- Source
  - coordinates: 2.879351°S 28.765469°E
- Mouth
  - coordinates: 1.673031°S 25.823879°E

The Ulindi River (Swahili: Mto Ulindi) is a tributary of the Lualaba River in the Democratic Republic of the Congo. There is a proposal to build a hydroelectric power plant on the river to power a gold mining project.

== Location ==
The river rises in the east of South Kivu and flows in a northwesterly direction through Maniema, joining the Lualaba downstream from Kindu. The upper Ulindi valley has a richly diverse fauna, including many monkey species, chimpanzees, leopards, buffaloes, elephants and antelopes. The valley has traditionally been occupied by the Lega and Nyindu people, speakers of Kilega and Kinyindu, a Bantu languages. It is administratively divided into the Mwenga, Shabunda and Pangi territories.

== History ==
In 1874 the Ulindi river was visited by the explorer Verney Lovett Cameron, the second European to cross Africa. During the Congo Free State period, the region was under the control of Arabs from the east coast of Africa. Some of these such as Munie Chabodu and Munie Mtoro were agents of the Free State. The town of Shabunda was established by the Arabs. In 1899 it had an estimated population of 8,000.

In June 1997 reports surfaced of a massacre of refugees in February that year at a bridge over the Ulindi just north of Shabunda in South Kivu. The refugees included unarmed civilians and armed Hutu fighters who had been involved in the 1994 massacre of Tutsis in Rwanda. They were attacked by Rwandan Tutsi troops who were fighting with the rebel forces of Laurent Kabila to overthrow the dictator Mobutu Sese Seko. Witnesses said that hundreds of people were killed.

== Gold recovery ==
In April 2009 Banro Corporation, a Canadian gold miner, reported results of a feasibility study for a hydroelectric power plant on the river. The project would exploit a 600 metres (2,000 ft) drop in the river over a distance of 18 kilometres (11 mi). It would cost about US$133.8 million, giving a "green" source of power for the Twangiza gold project. The mining concessions cover 1,164 square kilometres (449 sq mi) and are located 41 kilometres (25 mi) south-southwest of Bukavu. The proven and probable reserve based on a 0.5-gram-per-tonne cutoff grade is 4.54 million ounces of gold. The planned power plant will be in a "pristine montane forest", and will impact local fish-farming.

A study showed that 1,860 households living in the area between the Twangiza and Lulimbohwe rivers would be affected, with 1,257 having to be resettled. Most of the people are farmers or artisanal miners. In the rivers downstream of the project about 1,725 workers are engaged in recovery of gold, tin, tungsten and tantalum, in operations controlled by various rebel groups and warlords, often under the protection of local authorities. The illegally extracted metals are sold on the black market. Decades of artisanal mining have contaminated the river beds with lead, chromium, arsenic and possibly mercury.

== Sources ==
- Biebuyck, Daniel P. (1973). Lega culture; art, initiation, and moral philosophy among a Central African people. University of California Press. ISBN 0-520-02085-5.
- Blaes, X. (October 2008). "Découpage administratif de la République Démocratique du Congo" (PDF). PNUD-SIG. Archived from the original (PDF) on 2010-04-01.
- Cahn, Dianna (June 29, 1997). "Witnesses say troops killed refugees at bridge in Zaire 6/29/97". Associated Press. Archived from the original on 2012-06-16.
- Kaiser, John (2009-09-11). "John Kaiser's Ounces in the Ground, Part II - Banro's Twangiza". Mining Markets. Archived from the original on 2012-04-26.
- PennWell (February 4, 2009). "Study bolsters plan for 30-MW Ulindi 2 at DR Congo gold mine". Archived from the original on 2012-05-29.
- Schaller, George B. (1988). The Year of the Gorilla. University of Chicago Press. ISBN 0-226-73648-2.
- "Twangiza". Infomine. Archived from the original on 2014-07-15.
