= Vinagre (disambiguation) =

Vinagre is a discontinued VNC, SSH, RDP and SPICE client for the GNOME desktop environment.

It may also refer to:

- Boquerones en vinagre, a type of appetizer found in Spain
- Vinagre, Cape Verde, a village in the island of Brava, Cape Verde
- Estádio Leonardo Vinagre da Silveira, an association football stadium located in João Pessoa, Paraíba, Brazil
- David Vinagre Cristina (born 1978), Portuguese humorist
- Elizeu Antonio Ferreira Vinagre Godoy (born 1945), Brazilian footballer
- Roberto Pimenta Vinagre Filho (born 1992), Brazilian footballer
- Rúben Vinagre (born 1999), Portuguese footballer
