= Kampene =

- Town
- Location within Democratic Republic of the Congo
- Coordinates: 3.596790°S 26.665820°E
- Country: Democratic Republic of the Congo
- Province: Maniema
- Territory: Pangi Territory

Kampene is a town in Maniema province, Democratic Republic of the Congo (DRC). It is a center for informal artisanal gold mining.

== Location ==
Kampene is in the Pangi Territory of Maniema province. It is on the RS1122 highway, which runs between Kayuyu on RN31 to the west and Lukokola to the east. It is served by Kampene Airport. The Köppen climate classification is Aw : Tropical savanna, wet. As of 2018 the population was 37,034.

== Mining ==
Kampene is in the west of the Twangiza-Namoya gold belt. The area has long been known for deposits of cassiterite, diamonds and gold. Mining in the forest region around Kampene dates back to the colonial period, when it was undertaken by the Compagnie Belge d'Entreprises Minières, known as Cobelmin. The town of Kampene was founded in the colonial era to support gold, cassiterite and coltan mining operations. The Belgians installed a power plant, built an airstrip, and built schools, churches and a hospital. Mining continued despite the upheavals that followed independence.

The DRC government wants to formalize gold mining, which is an important part of the eastern DRC economy, so as to dry up funding for illegal armed groups. A study of artisanal gold mines around Kampene was conducted in July / August 2014 as part of this process. Issues included illegal taxation by the security forces and by administrative and local authorities, bribes to conceal or underestimate production, and the presence of armed groups. The miners were organized into cooperatives such as CEAMI (248 miners), COMIKABA (137 miners), COMIZO (95 miners), COMILU (92 miners) and other smaller groups. Formal companies included BITMAK, with a diamond exploration permit, and Kampene Mining SPRL, which was planning to start mining using industrial techniques. Kampene Mining stated that they wanted to work with the cooperatives and buy some of their output, but there were virtually no links between the cooperatives and the companies that own the areas.

The Kampene Gold Pilot is a German-Congolese cooperation project that aims to encourage legal gold supply chains for artisanal and small-scale gold mining around Kampene town. This area has over 10,000 informal gold miners, which have organized themselves into nine cooperatives and operate 32 gold mines. It the industry can be more open in tracing movement of gold and reporting transactions, there may be progress towards safer working conditions and reduced damage to the environment. In October 2019 an illegal gold mine in Kampene collapsed, killing at least 21 people.

== Sources ==
- Alvarez, Yves Bertran (October 2014), Rapport d'audit de base Projet CTC-BGR Mines de Kampene (PDF) (in French)inDR Congo: Illegal mine suffers deadly collapse in Kampene, BBC, 3 October 2019
- "Kampene", Mindat
- "La Quinta Acquires Kampene Gold Project in D.R. Congo", Vidskiptabladid, 20 February 2007
- "Node: Kampene (1094352547)", OpenStreetMap
- The Kampene Gold Pilot, Maniema, DR Congo – Fact Sheet (PDF), coopération allemande
- WBK Prospects, WB Kasai Investments Congo
