= Mwenga Territory =

Territory in South Kivu, DR Congo

Mwenga Wilaya ya Mwenga (Swahili)
- Territory
- Territoire de Mwenga
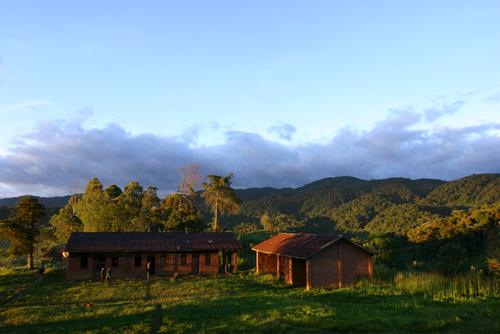
- Miki, located on the plateau of the Itombwe Mountains
- Interactive map of Mwenga
- Location within Democratic Republic of the Congo
- Coordinates: 3.05°S 28.433°E
- Country: DR Congo
- Province: South Kivu

Area
  - Total: 11,172 km^{2} (4,314 sq mi)

Population (2019)
  - Total: 843,636
  - Density: 75.513/km^{2} (195.58/sq mi)
- Time zone: UTC+2 (CAT)

Mwenga Territory is a territory in the province of South Kivu in the Democratic Republic of Congo. Established on 15 August 1949 during the Belgian colonial period, it was formed through the partition of Shabunda Territory (Wamuzimu Chiefdom), subdivisions of Kabare Territory (including the chiefdoms of Luhwindja, Burhinyi, and Lwindi), and a portion of Fizi Territory (Itombwe sector). The territory covers an area of 11,172 square kilometers and had an estimated population of 843,636 in 2019. It is bounded to the north by Walungu Territory, following the course of the Ulindi River and its confluence with Kadubo within Luhwindja Chiefdom. To the south, it shares boundaries with Fizi Territory along the limits of the Itombwe sector. On the eastern side, Mwenga Territory meets Uvira Territory near the highlands of Lake Lungwe and the upper Elila River, while to the west it borders Shabunda Territory.

The territory's economy is primarily based on subsistence agriculture, small livestock rearing, and artisanal gold mining. Administratively, Mwenga Territory is subdivided into five chiefdoms and one sector. Its population is ethnically diverse, including Lega, Nyindu, Bembe, Fuliiru, Vira, Shi, and Banyamulenge. Languages commonly spoken are Kilega, Shi, Swahili, Kinyindu, and Kibembe, while the major religions practiced include Catholicism, Protestantism, Islam, and Kimbanguism.

== Geography ==
=== Terrain and climate ===
Mwenga Territory ranges in elevation from 620 meters at its lowest point in Wamuzimu Chiefdom to 2,602 meters at Miki in the Itombwe Sector. The territory contains four distinct climatic zones: a humid tropical climate in Lwindi, Basile, and parts of Wamuzimu; a hot climate in southern Wamuzimu around Kitutu; a temperate climate in the savannas of Itombwe; and colder conditions in Burhinyi, Luhwinja, and portions of Itombwe. Two main seasons dominate the year, a rainy season from mid-September to mid-May, punctuated by a brief dry spell between February and May lasting 7 to 15 days, and a dry season extending from June to August. Average temperatures throughout the year vary between 18°C and 25°C.

Mwenga Territory is crossed by two major tributaries of the Congo River, namely the Ulindi River in Lwindi Chiefdom and the Elila River in Wamuzimu Chiefdom. These rivers irrigate fertile valleys and are fed by numerous tributaries, among them Bilahile, Lulumunyu, Mamunguzi, Kakanga, Tulambo, Zalya, Lusia, Mwana, Kabilombo, Kilungutwe, Kibe, Lubalya, and Zizi.

Regarding the main inland watercourses:

Basile Chiefdom	Burhinyi Chiefdom	Itombwe Sector
Bilalhe River	Kadubo River (upstream)	Kakanga River
Lulumunyu River	Muduve River	Tulambo River
Mamunguzi River		Makaina River
Kenya River		Tumungu River
Zombe River		Kilimbwe River
Luelola River		Elila River (upstream)
Kalambo River		Ulindi River (upstream)
Zalya River (upstream)		
Lusia River		

Luhwindja Chiefdom	Lwindi Chiefdom	Wamuzimu Chiefdom
Kadubo River (downstream)	Ulindi River (downstream)	Elila River (downstream)
Mwana River	Zokwe River	Zalya River (downstream)
Lulimbohe River	Kabilombo River	Kiliza River
	Kilungutwe River	Kitongo River
	Kakatulembe River	Lugushwa River
		Lusungu River
		Kibe River
		Lubyala River
		Zizi River

Source: Annual report of the Territorial Administration, 1995.

The vegetation of the territory is dominated by savanna, particularly in Burhinyi and Luhwinja, though patches of forest are found in the Itombwe sector, within which lies the Itombwe Nature Reserve. Dense forests extend over parts of Itombwe, Lwindi, Basile, and Wamuzimu.

The soils are generally fertile, with the notable exception of the more arid soils of Luhwinja. Three principal soil types can be distinguished. Sandy-clay soils, which are loose, well-aerated, and rich in humus, dominate Wamuzimu Chiefdom. Sandy-argillaceous soils, characterized by their compact structure and mineral richness, are commonly found along rivers and in areas such as Kamituga, Mozozo, and Kitutu. Clay-lime soils, compact and elastic in texture, are less widespread but occur in Kamituga and in other parts of the territory.

=== Administration and governance ===
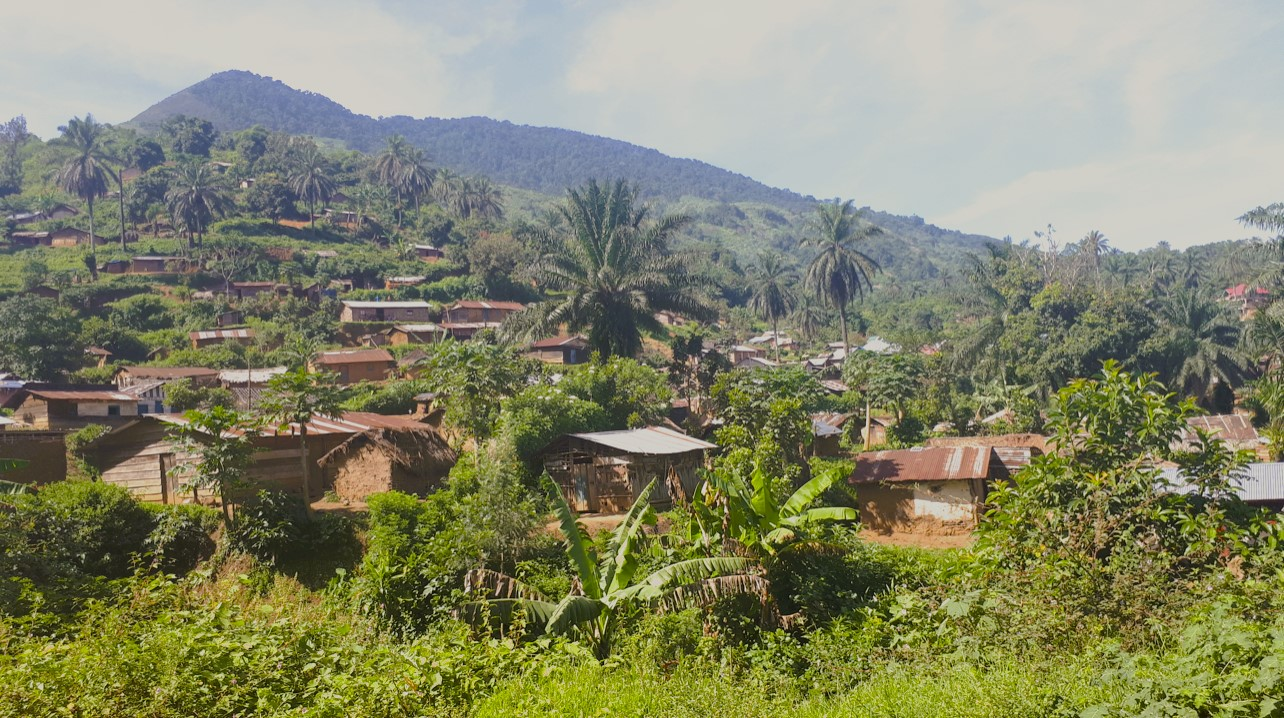
Kasika serves as the administrative center of the Lwindi Chiefdom

Mwenga Territory is divided into five chiefdoms—Basile, Luhwindja, Burhinyi, Lwindi, and Wamuzimu—and one sector, Itombwe. These subdivisions are further organized into groupements (groupings) and localités (villages). Each chiefdom and the sector is headed by a traditional chief (known as mwami, plural bami), who presides over customary authority, manages succession practices, and safeguards local traditions. Although the customary chiefs collaborate with the Territorial Administrator, they maintain a degree of autonomy in their internal governance.

At the intermediate level, each groupement is headed by a chef de groupement, typically drawn from the royal lineage. Their official recognition is conferred by order of the Minister of the Interior and Security, Decentralization, and Customary Affairs, and their installation is conducted by the Territorial Administrator or Mayor in the presence of the chiefdom's or sector's mwami. At the local level, village chiefs (chefs de village) handle administrative responsibilities such as population censuses, public health oversight, and civil registration, including declarations of births, deaths, and marriages. They are recognized by decision of the Territorial Administrator and installed by the chef de groupement in the presence of the mwami. In incorporated groupements, however, the authority of recognition lies with the Mayor. Village chiefs operate under the administrative authority of their respective chef de groupement.

Chiefdoms and sector	Area	Headquarters	Groupements
1. Basile	2,113 km^{2}	Mwenga	Bawanda; Babulinzi; Balobola; Bamunda; Basilubanda I; Basilubanda II; Basimwenda; Basitonga; Batumba; Bazalugulu
2. Luhwindja	183 km^{2}	Lubanda	Bujiri; Bwihembo; Chibanda II; Kababide; Karhundu; Idudwe; Luchiga; Lufaha; Mulama
3. Burhinyi	328 km^{2}	Birhala	Birhala; Budaka; Bugobe; Buhogo; Cheshero; Chibindye; Chirere; Chizuka; Chiriri; Karhendezi; Itudu; Kitwabaluz; Mulambi; Mulanga; Luhuku; Ntondo; Nyirindja; Kalambo
4. Lwindi	856 km^{2}	Kasika	Ihanga; Ilowe; Kalambi; Katarama; Kigogo; Kilimbwe; Kiomvu; Mukangala
5. Itombwe	3,580 km^{2}	Miki	Basikamakulu; Basimukindje I; Basimukindje II; Basimukuma; Basimwenda; Basimunyaka
6. Wamuzimu	4,112 km^{2}	Kitutu	Babongolo; Bagezi; Bangunga; Bakute; Balighi; Balinzi; Bamulinda; Banamukika; Banakyungu; Banampute; Basibugembe; Basikasa; Basikamakulu; Basikumbilwa; Basimbi; Basimwenda; Basitabale; Buse; Bawandeme; Bazyala B; Leproserie

Source: Annual Report.

== History ==
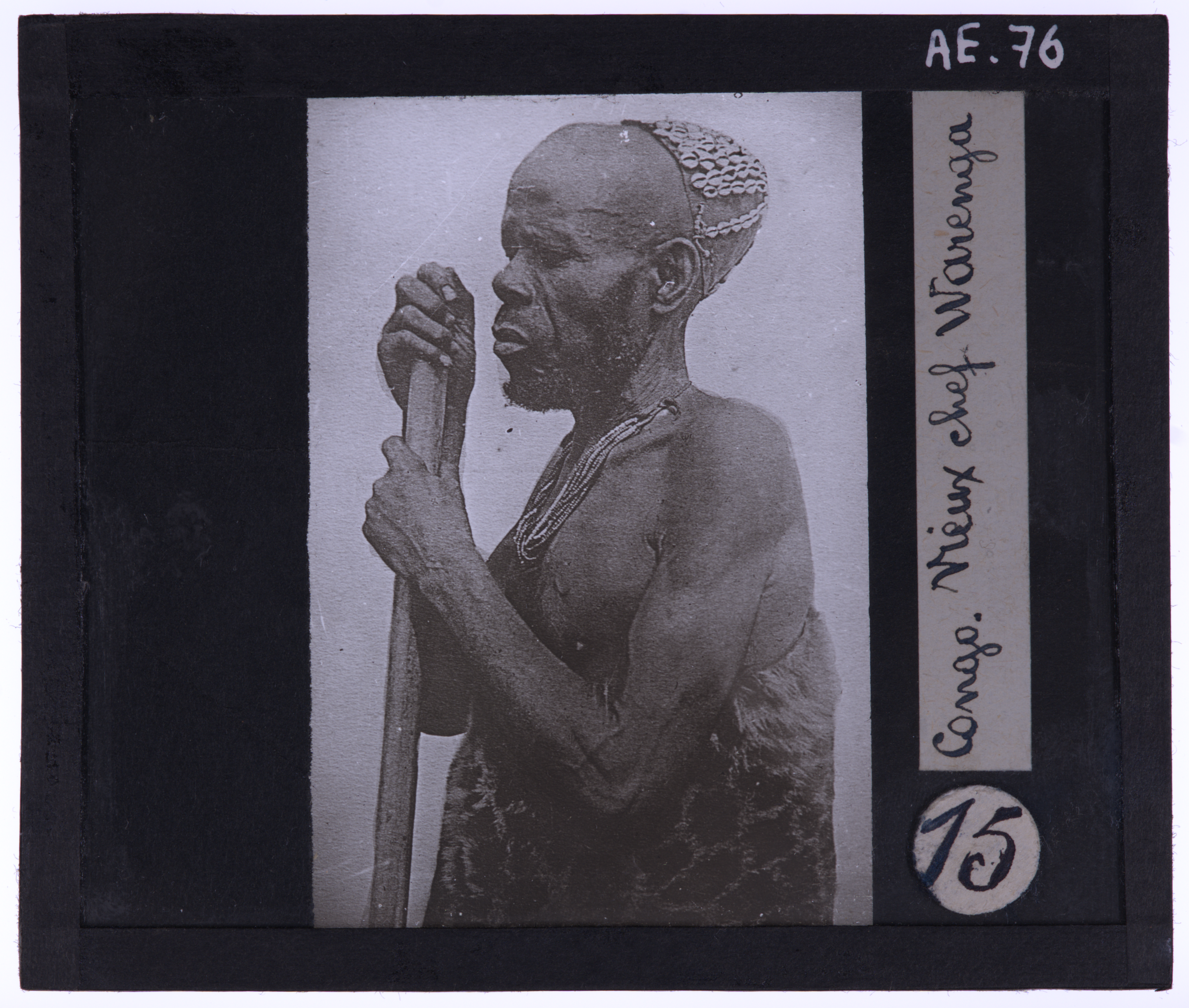
Lega man wearing a headdress adorned with cowrie shells, traditionally worn by initiates of the Bwami society. Circa 1890–1930.

Mwenga Territory has historically been home to a culturally diverse population made up of Bantu and Pygmy ethnic groups. Among the dominant Bantu groups are the Lega people, a forest-dwelling group who trace their origins to migratory movements from northern regions of the present-day Democratic Republic of the Congo, following the course of the Congo River. As they moved, the Lega came into contact with Pygmy groups of the equatorial forest, leading to their settlement in areas such as Shabunda Territory and Kindu. Their gradual migration southward, particularly along the Elila and Ulindi Rivers, encouraged additional expansion and integration. The Lega also intermarried and mingled with other ethnic groups, including the Shi, Bembe, and Nyindu, which led to the emergence of new clans such as the Batumba and Bashimwenda (now prominent in the Basile and Wamuzimu Chiefdoms).

Traditionally, the Lega subsisted through a combination of hunting, gathering, fishing, fish farming, agriculture, and livestock rearing, with trade conducted largely via barter systems. Social customs were characterized by elaborate marital rites, beginning with family blessing ceremonies (Buya), followed by the Mwembu and Alonjo rituals, which respectively marked the birth of the first and second children. The Lega also practiced a dual-structured traditional belief system: Kimbilikiti, a spiritual tradition for men, and Iyano ("education"), a system of initiation for women and adolescent girls entering adulthood. Enforcement of moral and social norms was the responsibility of secret societies such as Muzombo and Abi, which were tasked with upholding taboos and administering sanctions to transgressors.

Administratively, Mwenga Territory was formally created by Ordinance No. 62/142 of 15 August 1949 of the Governor General of the Belgian Congo through the division of Shabunda Territory (Wamuzimu Chiefdom) and the subdivision of Kabare Territory (chiefdoms of Luhwinja, Burhinyi, and Lwindi), along with part of Fizi Territory (Itombwe sector).

== Demographics ==
=== Population ===
According to the 2003 census, Mwenga Territory had a population of 317,423 inhabitants. The population was generally characterized by low incomes, limited education, and poor access to healthcare, with high morbidity and mortality rates. Around 60 percent of women were illiterate. By 2019, the population was estimated to have increased to 843,636.

The territory is home to several ethnic groups, with the Lega constituting the majority and inhabiting the Wamuzimu and Basile Chiefdoms. The Nyindu reside primarily in Lwindi Chiefdom, while the Shi dominate Burhinyi and Luhwinja Chiefdoms. In the Itombwe Sector, the Bembe form the majority, though they coexist with the Fuliiru, Nyindu, Vira, and a minority population of Lega. The Banyamulenge also reside in this sector. The main language is Swahili, which serves as the dominant lingua franca across the territory and is used in all spheres of life, including education, administration, and commerce. Kilega is spoken in Wamuzimu and Basile Chiefdoms by the Lega, Mashi is spoken in Burhinyi and Luhwinja by the Shi, and Kinyindu is spoken in Lwindi by the Nyindu. In Itombwe, Kibembe is spoken by the Bembe, while Kinyarwanda is spoken by the Banyamulenge.

=== Health ===
Mwenga Territory is divided into four health zones:

Health Zones (zones de santé)		Population
1.	Mwenga Health Zone	158,457
2.	Kamituga Health Zone	154,208
3.	Kitutu Health Zone	103,945
4.	Burhinyi and Luhwinja Health Zone	116,300

The territory has six hospitals, seven medical centers, and 99 health centers. However, these facilities are insufficient to meet the growing needs of the population, with many residents lacking access to qualified medical care due to government-run facilities being poorly resourced and facing operational difficulties. Missionary-run facilities are generally better supplied. The most prevalent diseases include malaria, HIV and other sexually transmitted infections, anemia, diabetes, hypertension, diarrhea, cholera, typhoid fever, tuberculosis, and epilepsy.

=== Education ===
Mwenga Territory counts eight nursery schools, 745 primary schools, and 239 secondary schools. However, information on their distribution across the territory is lacking. The territorial administration itself receives no operating funds. Higher education is represented by two institutions located in Kamituga: the Université Libre de Mwenga and the Institut Supérieur Pédagogique de Kamituga (ISP-Kamituga). The Université Libre de Mwenga offers programs in social, political, and administrative sciences; economics and management sciences; agricultural sciences and biodiversity; and psychology. It also houses an Institute of Health Sciences, which provides training in nursing. The Institut Supérieur de Développement Rural (ISDR) once organized an extension in Kamituga, before ministerial decrees prohibited such extensions. At ISP-Kamituga, courses are offered in English (with an emphasis on African culture), French (African languages), Business Information Technology, Mathematics and Computer Science, and Mathematics and Physics.

== Economy ==
=== Economic sites ===
Site	Description
Kamituga Mining Center	Kamituga was established in 1923 by the Compagnie Minière des Grands-Lacs (MGL), which launched its development as a gold mining hub in South Kivu. Its urban status was first conferred by Decrees No. 13/029 and 13/030 of 13 June 2013, which elevated several agglomerations to city and municipal rank. Although these measures were suspended in 2015—reducing the overall number of cities—Kamituga's status was later restored in December 2018, officially recognizing it as the 36th city of the Democratic Republic of the Congo. The town has long served as the administrative seat of Mwenga Territory, with its growth tied closely to the exploitation of auriferous deposits from the Elila River basin. Management of mining operations initially fell under MGL, which in 1969 merged with Kivumines, Phibraki, and Cobelmin. A subsequent merger with SYMETAIN in 1976 created the Société Minière et Industrielle du Kivu (SOMINKI), in which the Congolese state retained a 28% interest, while the Empain Group held the majority of shares.
Kitutu	Kitutu is the administrative seat of the Wamuzimu Chiefdom, within the Bakute groupement. It hosts the headquarters of the Kitutu Health Zone, including the General Reference Hospital of Kitutu and multiple health centers. The site also contains a micro-hydroelectric plant on the Nyamupe River, formerly supporting agro-pastoral industries such as rice fields and oil processing. Kitutu also encompasses the mining town of Lugushwa, which attracts much of the active population of Mwenga and South Kivu, many of whom have shifted from agriculture to artisanal mining of gold, coltan, and cassiterite.
Mungombe	Mungombe is the administrative seat of the Bashikasa groupement, located about 15 km from Kamituga. It is historically significant for hosting the first Catholic mission in Mwenga Territory and the only minor seminary of the Diocese of Uvira, which trained several local intellectuals. However, conflicts destroyed most socio-economic infrastructure, including the seminary, schools, health centers, and dispensaries. However, Mungombe hosts a micro-hydroelectric plant on the Zizi River, which supplies electricity to Kamituga and surrounding areas.
Mwenga-Center	Mwenga-Center is the administrative headquarters of the territory. It contains a micro-hydroelectric plant on the Bilinga River (eastern sector) and an airstrip for small aircraft at Kishe-Ilinda. Agriculture and fish farming constitute the main sources of income for its inhabitants.
Kasika	Kasika is one of Mwenga Territory's principal commercial centers and the seat of the Lwindi Chiefdom. It is also historically marked as the site of the Kasika massacre, where the Rwandan Patriotic Army (RPA) killed over 1,000 civilians from 23 to 24 August 1998. Since the assassination of Mwami François Mubeza II Nalwindi during the events, the area has experienced persistent political instability and the risk of renewed intercommunal conflict.

=== Agriculture ===
Agriculture constitutes the primary livelihood for the majority of the territory. The main crops include cassava, beans, peanuts, bananas, and rice, most of which are cultivated for subsistence. Cassava production is widespread, particularly in Kitutu, where surpluses are sold in Kamituga. Peanuts are commonly processed into a paste known locally as kindakinda, while rice production remains primarily for household consumption. Bananas and beans supplement the diet and provide modest trade opportunities within local markets. Mwenga Territory also experiences heavy internal migration, north-south and east-west, with women constituting a large proportion of migrants, often traveling from their homes to markets in search of agricultural products or household items. In Kamituga and Kitutu, the shortage of arable land forces women to seek farmland in surrounding villages, including areas near the Mungombe seminary and Ngabwa.

Non-timber forest products also play an important role in food security, with mushrooms, caterpillars, and bushmeat collected from surrounding forests and consumed locally, although their availability is largely seasonal. In addition, small-scale palm oil production provides cooking oil for household use and occasional sale in local markets.

=== Livestock, forestry, and fishing ===
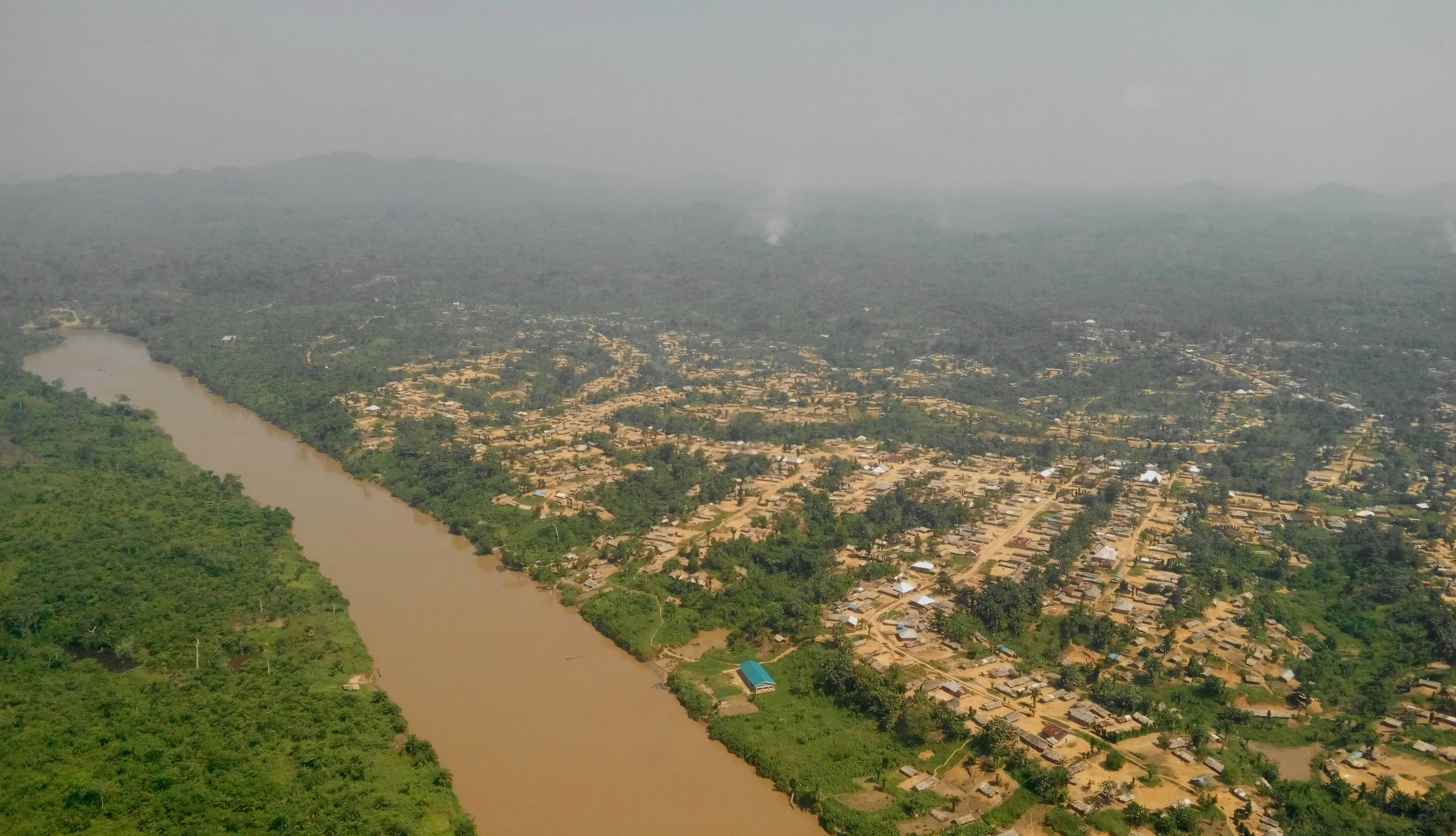
Originating in Mount Piernard, the Ulindi River flows westward across the Mwenga Territory and Shabunda Territory.

Before the outbreak of the First Congo War, Mwenga Territory had a strong livestock sector, with over 600 head of cattle in the southern chiefdoms (Basile, Lwindi, and Wamuzimu), and more than 35,000 in the northern regions (Luhwinja, Burhinyi, and Itombwe), where advanced livestock systems were in place. However, the First and Second Congo Wars led to the loss of around 90% of this livestock due to looting by armed factions. Presently, livestock farming is mostly limited to small animals, except in Itombwe, where cattle remain important for social functions such as paying dowries and accessing healthcare and education. Forestry also supports the local economy, through domestic use and commercial trade. Logging activities, such as those carried out by local operators like Katangais, supply wood to Bukavu and surrounding towns, while firewood and charcoal remain the most widely used household fuels.

Fishing is primarily artisanal and rudimentary, carried out in major rivers such as the Elila, Ulindi, and Zalya. The territory contains over 12,000 fish ponds, though estimates suggest more than 18,000 exist. The Basile Chiefdom alone has more than 8,000 ponds.

=== Mining, trade and commerce ===
Artisanal and small-scale mining are based in the Wamuzimu and Basile Chiefdoms. Gold is the primary resource extracted, involving independent miners, cooperatives, and traders. Kamituga serves as the mining hub, hosting more than half of the territory's economic actors. Private entrepreneurs also take part in the sector, such as Nazolo, who combines extraction activities with operating a mineral purchasing house. On a larger scale, international companies like the Canadian-based Banro Corporation engaged in large-scale gold exploration and development in the Burhinyi Chiefdom.

Kamituga is the center of trade and commerce. Small and medium-sized enterprises (SMEs) and informal traders dominate economic activity, with a focus on retail and general trade. Manufactured products such as clothing, textiles, plastic utensils, pots, and household appliances are supplied from Bukavu and increasingly from international markets such as Dubai. Many traders travel abroad to source goods before reselling them locally. Notable economic operators include Pendano, active in wholesale and retail trade of manufactured goods; Mbike, specializing in petroleum product sales; and Sami, who provides passenger and goods transport between Bukavu and Kamituga, including alcoholic beverages and manufactured items. In addition, Ntanama, at Tate and Kilosho, operates hotels providing accommodation services.

Mwenga Territory hosts 31 markets and 13 commercial centers. However, these markets are poorly organized and face persistent challenges like the sharp increase in the prices of essential goods, which puts basic goods out of reach for many families. Meanwhile, manufactured goods often go unsold because of the population's very low purchasing power. Businesses also suffer from excessive taxation and extortion by government officials and security services.

=== Energy ===
Energy access remains limited. Wood fuel, primarily in the form of firewood and charcoal, accounts for about 80 percent of household energy consumption, mainly for cooking. Electricity, representing approximately 11 percent of total use, is scarce and largely confined to Kamituga, where the Mungombe hydroelectric power plant on the Zizi River supplies power.

Other energy sources include petroleum products (5 percent), solar power (3 percent), and batteries (1 percent). Outside Kamituga, most households rely on kerosene lamps for lighting, while businesses and institutions use kerosene-powered generators during the day. The United Nations Organization Stabilization Mission in the Democratic Republic of the Congo (MONUSCO) maintains constant generator operation, and solar panels are used selectively by the referral hospital and international NGOs.

== Infrastructure ==
=== Transport and communication ===
Mwenga Territory can be reached mainly by road and, to a lesser extent, by air. The main artery is the National Road No. 2, which runs from Bukavu via Burhale in Ngweshe Chiefdom of Walungu Territory, passing through Mwenga Center and continuing to Lwino-Kalole in Shabunda Territory, covering a distance of 344 kilometers. However, road conditions are extremely poor, especially during the rainy season, when travel becomes difficult and at times impossible. Agricultural service roads are largely unusable, and the route from Mwenga center to the Itombwe sector, a distance of approximately 100 kilometers, is also non-functional. Reaching Itombwe requires travelers to pass through Walungu Territory, Kabare Territory, Bukavu, Uvira Territory, and Fizi Territory.

Air transport provides limited alternatives. Mwenga Territory hosts several airstrips, including Ilinda/Mwenga, which is owned by the Catholic Church; Manungu/Kamituga and Lugushwa, both formerly managed by SOMINKI; Nyamibungu, under the administration of the 5th CELPA; Kazuza, managed by the 40th CECA; as well as Mulambula/Mungombe, Kitutu, and Mikenge in Itombwe, all affiliated with the Catholic Church. However, the majority of these airstrips have fallen into disuse due to poor maintenance. Only the airstrips at Kamituga, Nyamibungu, Lugushwa, and Ilinda remain in relatively operational condition. In addition, a private airstrip is located in Luchiga, which is primarily used by helicopters operated by Banro Corporation for mining-related activities.

Telecommunication coverage is limited despite the presence of four major operators: Airtel, Orange RDC, Tigo, and Vodacom RDC. Network quality is generally poor, with frequent interruptions and low connectivity in rural areas.

=== Environment and conservation ===
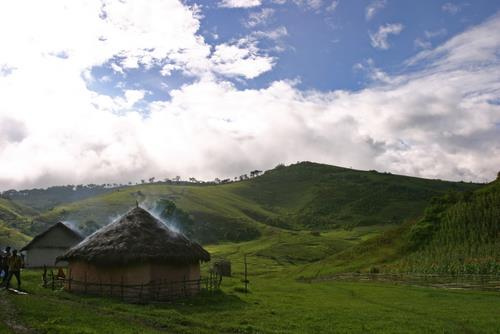
A village of the Bembe people located in the Itombwe plateau. The village features traditional round huts with thatched roofs.

Mwenga Territory is home to the Itombwe Nature Reserve, one of the most significant biodiversity hotspots in the Democratic Republic of the Congo. The reserve hosts a wide range of species, including several that are endangered or endemic. Two primates threatened with extinction, the dusky bushbaby and western red colobus, make the Itombwe Massif particularly important for primate conservation in Africa. Other notable fauna include lowland gorillas, chimpanzees, buffalo, antelopes, and a variety of other mammal species. Avifauna thrives in the region, with over 589 bird species documented in the massif, accounting for half of the species found in Africa's mountainous regions. The massif also contains 94 percent of the bird species typical of the Central African Highlands (Central African Rift) and 89 percent of their endemic species. Itombwe Massif's flora remains poorly studied, but preliminary surveys have identified a high diversity of plant species with significant endemism. Flagship species of flora include lychee, Lebrunia bushaie, and Muvula.

The reserve is jointly managed by the World Wide Fund for Nature (WWF) and the Institut Congolais pour la Conservation de la Nature (ICCN).
