= Hyperolius leucotaenius =

Conservation status
- Endangered (IUCN 3.1)

Scientific classification
- Kingdom: Animalia
- Phylum: Chordata
- Class: Amphibia
- Order: Anura
- Family: Hyperoliidae
- Genus: Hyperolius
- Species: H. leucotaenius

Binomial name
- Hyperolius leucotaenius Laurent, 1950

Species of frog

Hyperolius leucotaenius is a species of frog in the family Hyperoliidae. It is endemic to Democratic Republic of the Congo. Its natural habitats are subtropical or tropical moist montane forests, swamps, freshwater marshes, and intermittent freshwater marshes. It is threatened by habitat loss.

At one time thought to be extinct, in 2011 Hyperolius leucotaenius was found and photographed on the banks of the Elila River, a tributary of the Lualaba.
