= Kampene Airport =

- IATA: none; ICAO: FZOE

Summary
- Airport type: Public
- Serves: Kampene
- Elevation AMSL: 2,034 ft / 620 m
- Coordinates: 3°35′35″S 26°42′05″E

Map
- Location of the airport in Democratic Republic of the Congo

Runways
Direction	Length		Surface
Direction	m	ft	Surface
11/29	860	2,822	Gravel
- Sources: Google Maps GCM

Kampene Airport (ICAO: FZOE) is an airport serving the town of Kampene in Maniema Province, Democratic Republic of the Congo. The runway is 3 kilometres (1.9 mi) east of town.

== See also ==
- Transport in the Democratic Republic of the Congo
- List of airports in the Democratic Republic of the Congo
