= David Cristina =

Portuguese humorist

David Vinagre Cristina (born 1978, in Portimão) is a Portuguese humorist, stand-up comedian, storyteller, podcaster, radio and television personality, corporate executive, entrepreneur, stock investor and investment consultant, with a PhD on the field of genetics of ageing (University of California, San Francisco) and specialization in venture capital and private equity investing. Besides his extensive activity on Portuguese radio and television as a humorist, comedian and host, David Vinagre Cristina is the executive director for investments at the Lisbon branch of Fosun International and was investment consultant of Portugal's state-run venture capital and early-stage investing arm Portugal Ventures from 2015 to 2017 and member of government cabinet after has been appointed adviser of the Portuguese Secretary of State for Science from 2011 to 2015 in the XIX Constitutional Government of Portugal.

== Early life ==
David Cristina was born in Portimão, Algarve region, Portugal. He always had a strong inclination towards radio broadcasting and communication studies to such an extent that at 15 years old he sent a recorded maquette to a national radio broadcasting corporation which was scouting for new talent. Nevertheless, at 18, he moved to Lisbon in order to study microbiology and genetics at the University of Lisbon. He spent a year at Umea University as an undergraduate invited student. He then enrolled at the Instituto Gulbenkian de Ciência biomedical PhD program and finalized his PhD studies at the University of California, San Francisco with a thesis on the field of genetics of ageing. He started to focus his attention from the laboratory and scientific research camp of life sciences to the stock investing and business management camp of science. This shift took him to a career in life sciences-related entrepreneurship, early-stage investing, seed funding, investment management, venture capital and private equity.

== Personal life ==
David Vinagre Cristina is heir to the family's medronho strawberry tree fruit brandy business founded by his grandparent Oliveiros Cristina in Algarve region of southern Mainland Portugal, one of the oldest and largest producers of the typical Algarve strawberry tree fruit drink in all of Portugal and reputedly the original producer and creator of the nationally recognized brand Brandymel (medronho strawberry tree fruit brandy with honey and herbs), a trademark currently owned by other businesses due to the absence of a valid registered trademark filled by the original creators. After this, the original family business rebranded its Brandymel product as Dom Cristina. David Cristina divorced in 2021 and is father of two children from his first and only marriage. David Vinagre Cristina's father name is also David Cristina. He is a Portuguese businessman who has run and operated the family medronho brandy business founded by his own father Oliveiros Cristina. David Vinagre Cristina's father has a degree in chemical engineering (Instituto Superior Técnico) and was a conscripted soldier fighting for the Portuguese Armed Forces during the Portuguese Colonial War in the early 1970s who was deployed to a combat zone in Portuguese Guinea. David Vinagre Cristina's mother is a Portuguese language teacher. David Cristina has been linked to the Portuguese political party Iniciativa Liberal.
