= Elila River =

River in Democratic Republic of the Congo

Location
- Country: Democratic Republic of the Congo

Physical characteristics
- Mouth
  - coordinates: 2.741501°S 25.871429°E

Basin features
- River system: Congo Basin

The Elila River (Swahili: Mto Elila) is a tributary of the Lualaba River in the Democratic Republic of the Congo. It rises in Mwenga Territory of Sud-Kivu Province and flows west through Shabunda Territory and then Pangi Territory in Maniema Province, entering the Lualaba just downstream of Kindu.

In the upper reaches there are rolling grasslands to the south of the river, but the Itombwe Mountains to the north are rugged, covered by rainforest except where rock bluffs emerge from the steepest slopes. This country is home to gorillas. The middle and upper Elila valley is traditionally home to the Lega people.

At one time thought to be extinct, in 2011 the endangered frog Hyperolius leucotaenius was found and photographed on the banks of the Elila.

== Sources ==
- Biebuyck, Daniel P. (1973). Lega culture; art, initiation, and moral philosophy among a Central African people. University of California Press. ISBN 0-520-02085-5.
- Blaes, X. (October 2008). "Découpage administratif de la République Démocratique du Congo" (PDF). PNUD-SIG. Archived from the original (PDF) on 2010-04-01.
- Schaller, George B. (1988). The Year of the Gorilla. University of Chicago Press. ISBN 0-226-73648-2.
- "See-Through Frog". National Geographic. May 17, 2011.
