= Itombwe Mountains =

Mountain range in the Democratic Republic of the Congo

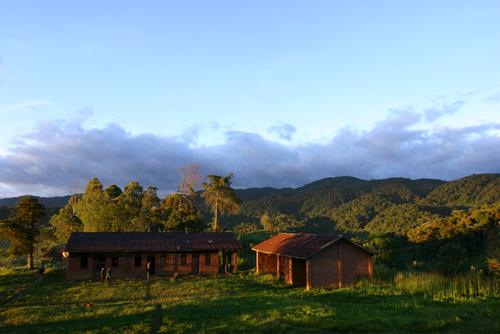
- Miki, on the plateau of Itombwe

Highest point
- Elevation: 3,475 m (11,401 ft)
- Coordinates: 3°30′0″S 28°55′0″E

Geography
- Location within Democratic Republic of the Congo
- Location: South Kivu, Democratic Republic of the Congo

The Itombwe Mountains (or Itombwe Massif, Plateau) are a range of mountains in the South Kivu province of the Democratic Republic of the Congo (DRC). They run along the west shore of the northern part of Lake Tanganyika. They contain a vast area of contiguous montane forest and are home to a rich diversity of wildlife.

== Geography ==
The Itombwe mountains are a section of the Albertine Rift Mountains, which border the western branch of the East African Rift. These mountains extend from the Rwenzori Mountains in the north to the Marungu highlands in the south. They are made up of uplifted Pre-Cambrian basement rocks overlaid in places by recent volcanic activity. Both of these are caused by the forces that created the Great Rift Valley, where tectonic stresses are causing parts of East Africa to separate from the continent. The highest peak of the Albertine Rift Mountains is further north in the Rwenzori Mountains, at 5,100 metres (16,700 ft).

The highest peak in the Itombwe range is Mount Mohi, at 3,475 metres (11,401 ft). Several other peaks are higher than 3,000 metres (9,800 ft). The mountains drop sharply in the east to the Ruzizi plain bordering Lake Tanganyika. They form a plateau that slopes down more gently to the west. The Elila River rises in the mountains, which are covered by forest except where rock bluffs emerge from the steepest slopes.

Temperatures range from about 50 °F (10 °C) to 70 °F (21 °C), with a mean temperature of about 60 °F (16 °C) all year round. Frost is occasionally experienced at night. Average annual precipitation is around 65 inches (1,700 mm). There is a relatively cool, dry season with little rain between June and August.

== Flora ==
The Itombwe Forest of the southern Rift covers a huge area that has had little attention from botanists. Montane forest covers around 650,000 hectares (1,600,000 acres) above 1,500 metres (4,900 ft), the largest block of such forest in the region. The forest is patchy on the east slopes. On the west there is an exceptional progression of bamboo, montane forest, grassland, and then more montane forest with a canopy reaching 25 metres (82 ft) blending into lowland forest.

== Fauna ==
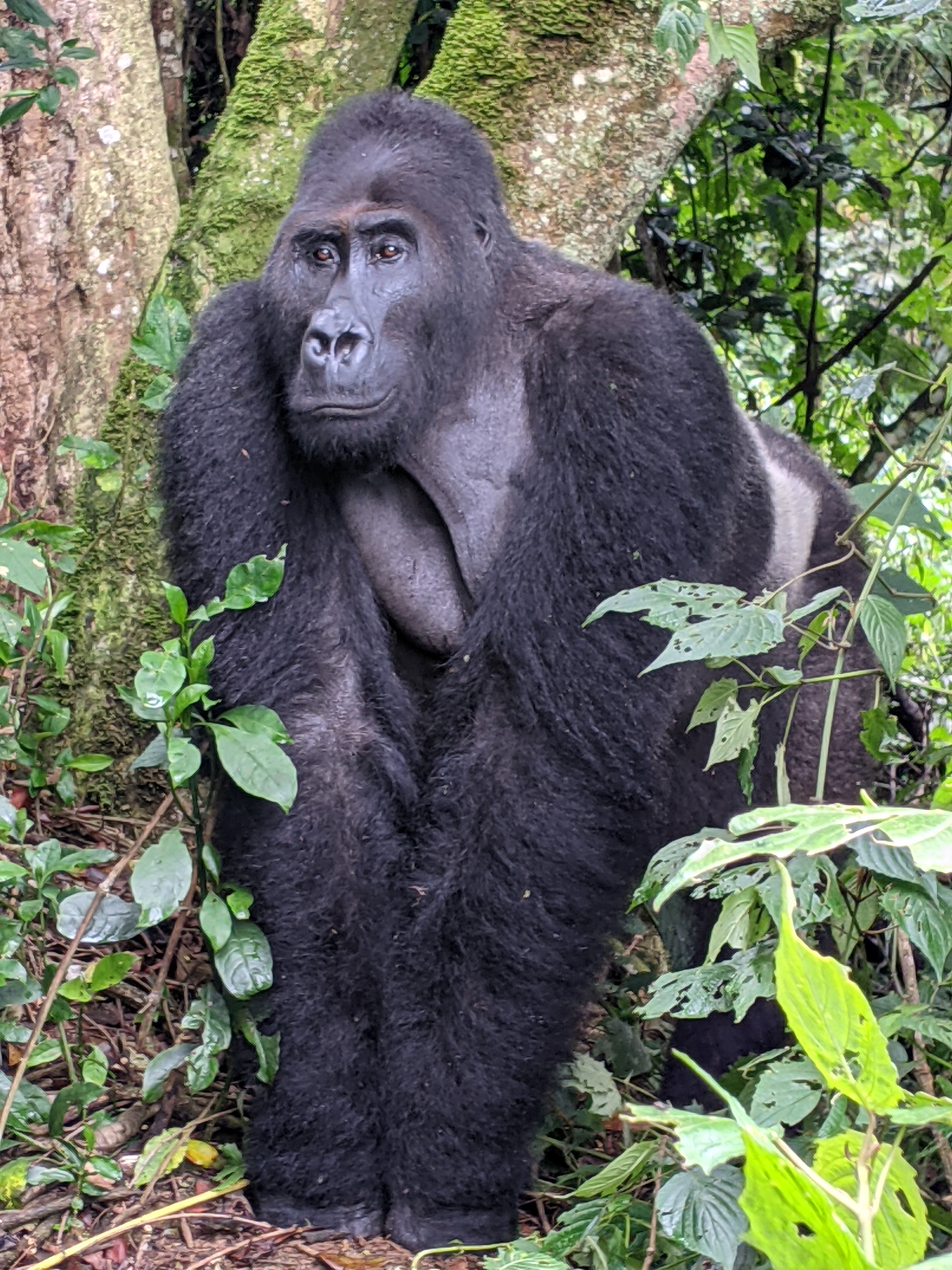
Eastern lowland gorilla Gorilla beringei graueri

The mountains are home to endangered Eastern lowland gorillas, chimpanzees and African bush elephants. Rudolf Grauer spent three months in the mountains in 1908, collecting twelve gorillas for the Vienna Museum. A survey in 1996 estimated that there were at least 860 gorillas in the massif. The Grauer population of gorillas in the Itombwe mountains and the region to the north and west is one of three gorilla populations in East Africa, the others being the Bwindi and Virunga populations.

The survey recorded fifty-six species of mammals. A type of shrew that has only been collected once is most likely the oldest of all shrew species in Africa. The Itombwe Mountains are much the most important part of the Albertine Rift Highlands for bird conservation, being home to 32 of the 37 species of bird endemic to the highlands. They include the most important site in the region for montane forest birds, with 565 species identified. Of these, 31 are endemic to the Albertine Rift and three have only been found here.

== People ==
The Itombwe massif is home to several ethnic groups distributed across its slopes and territories. The Bafuliru dominate the northern side, especially the Uvira-facing slopes, and are heavily present in areas like Mulenge, Kigoma, and the upper parts of Uvira Territory. The Babembe are the most widespread ethnic group throughout the central and southern stretches of the massif, particularly in the Fizi and Mwenga Territories, where they have deep historical roots tied to farming and resistance movements. The Banyindu (Nyindu people), primarily associated with Luindi Chiefdom in Mwenga, inhabit the eastern and forested slopes of the massif. The Banyamulenge, of Tutsi heritage who migrated in the early 20th century (1910s–1920s) from Rwanda, are found mostly in the high-altitude zones but constitute a smaller population compared to the other groups; while politically and symbolically prominent, they are not the majority. The Bembe form the largest ethnic group within the massif, followed by the Fuliru people.

With the conflict of the Second Congo War (1998-2003) and subsequent instability many displaced people have entered the region. The region has been the scene of struggles between different armed groups, causing severe humanitarian and environmental problems. NGOs have been attempting to help local communities recover and develop sustainable agricultural and practices while conserving the forest. The major mining center of Kamituga is near the north-west edge of the montane forest.

== Conservation issues ==
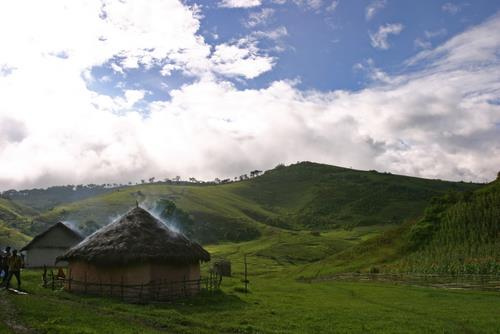
Babembe village on the Itombwe plateau

The range is still not protected, although there have been proposals to designate all the montane forest and two patches of lowland forest to the south of the upper Elila River as conservation areas. As of 2010 the mountains were inaccessible to tourists. In some areas they have low human populations and the environment is relatively undisturbed. However, the population around the forest is growing, the forest around the villages is being cleared for agriculture and firewood, and the grasslands at higher levels are used to graze cattle. Mining and hunting are other causes of stress to the environment. Perhaps the main concern of conservationists is that the forests, which are the largest and least fragmented in the region, may be logged.

The Itombwe mountains were given a high conservation priority at a World Wide Fund for Nature (WWF) conference held in Libreville, Gabon in 2000 since they are a globally important biodiversity region for birds, mammals and reptiles. At first it was expected that they would be covered by a conservation program for the Albertine Rift. By 2006 it had been accepted that they should be included in a program specifically for the DRC. In late 2006 the Institut Congolais pour la Conservation de la Nature (ICCN), helped by the (WWF), had managed to obtain a declaration from the DRC Ministry of Environment that created the Itombwe Nature Reserve. The declaration did not define the completely protected core zone, mixed-use zones and development zones but left settlement of the zone boundaries to a later process involving consultation with the local communities.

A book published in 2011 said the Itombwe Massif was undergoing severe destruction. Law and order had broken down. People were moving in to grow crops or to mine for gold, diamonds and columbo-tantalite, which is used in semiconductors and computer chips.

== Sources ==
- "Albertine Rift montane forests". Terrestrial Ecoregions. World Wildlife Fund.
- Birdlife (2011). "CD014 Itombwe Mountains". BirdLife International. Archived from the original on 2012-04-26.
- Briggs, Philip; Roberts, Andrew (2010). Uganda, 6th Bradt Travel Guide Uganda. Bradt Travel Guides. ISBN 978-1-84162-309-2.
- Bruijnzeel, Leendert Adriaan; Scatena, F. N.; Hamilton, L. S. (2011). Tropical Montane Cloud Forests: Science for Conservation and Management. Cambridge University Press. ISBN 978-0-521-76035-5.
- Doumenge, C. (Aug 1998). "Forest Diversity, Distribution, and Dynamique in the Itombwe Mountains, South-Kivu, Congo Democratic Republic". Mountain Research and Development. 18 (3): 249–264. doi:10.2307/3674036. JSTOR 3674036.
- "Climate Data Itombwe Mountains". GlobalSpecies. Archived from the original on 2012-05-08.
- IUCN Netherlands (2006). "Rehabilitation of sustainable agricultural production around Itombwe forest". Archived from the original on 2012-06-05.
- I. Omari; J. A. Hart; T. M. Butynski; N. R. Birhashirwa; A. Upoki; Y. M'keyo; F. Bengana; M. Bashonga; N. Bagurubumwe (1999). "The Itombwe Massif, Democratic Republic of Congo: biological surveys and conservation, with an emphasis on Grauer's gorilla and birds endemic to the Albertine Rift". Oryx. 33 (4): 301–322. doi:10.1046/j.1365-3008.1999.00076.x.
- Schaller, George B. (1988). The Year of the Gorilla. University of Chicago Press. ISBN 0-226-73648-2.
- Stoinski, Tara S.; Steklis, Horst D.; Mehlman, Patrick T. (2007). Conservation in the 21st century: gorillas as a case study. Springer. ISBN 978-0-387-70720-4.
- Stuart, S. N.; Adams, Richard J. (1990). Biodiversity in sub-saharan Africa and its islands: conservation, management and sustainable use. IUCN. p. 33. ISBN 2-8317-0021-3.
- Yanggen, David; Angu, Kenneth; Tchamou, Nicodème (2010). Landscape-scale conservation in the Congo Basin: lessons learned from the Central African Regional Program for the Environment (CARPE). IUCN. ISBN 978-2-8317-1288-8.
