= Pangi, Democratic Republic of the Congo =

Pangi
- Location within Democratic Republic of the Congo
- Coordinates: 3.170597°S 26.636052°E
- Country: Democratic Republic of the Congo
- Province: Maniema
- Territory: Pangi Territory

Pangi is a community in the Democratic Republic of the Congo. It is the administrative center of Pangi Territory in Maniema Province.

== Sources ==
- Blaes, X. (October 2008). "Découpage administratif de la République Démocratique du Congo" (PDF). PNUD-SIG. Archived from the original (PDF) on 2010-04-01.
