= Economics of science =

Study of the economic impact of scientific research and institutions

The economics of science aims to understand the impact of science on the advance of technology, to explain the behavior of scientists, and to understand the efficiency or inefficiency of scientific institutions and science markets.

The importance of the economics of science is substantially due to the importance of science as a driver of technology and technology as a driver of productivity and growth. Believing that science matters, economists have attempted to understand the behavior of scientists and the operation of scientific institutions.

== Science as a public good ==
Economists consider "science" as the search and production of knowledge using known starting conditions. Knowledge can be considered a public good, due to the fact that its utility to society is not diminished with additional consumption (non-rivalry), and once the knowledge is shared with the public it becomes very hard to restrict access to it or use of it (non-excludable).

Traditional public economic theory asserts that competitive markets provide poor incentives for production of a public good because the producers cannot reap the benefits of use of their product, and thus costs will be higher than benefits. Economists have identified several possible reasons as to why producers of science might determine that the private costs they incur in the production process are larger than the benefits that they intend to reap, even though the benefits to society are greater than these costs. Firstly, the technological barriers to production are extremely high, which makes the market very risky.

Technological barriers refer to the cost of research and development of new scientific knowledge, which becomes increasingly expensive as technology continues to play a more prominent role in this type of development. Secondly, due to the non-excludable nature of scientific knowledge, producers worry that they will be unable to enforce property rights on their produced goods. This will result in others being able to benefit from the scientific knowledge without having to bear the cost of the research and development, which would in turn make the potential return on investment too small to incentivize participation in the market. Therefore, science can be understood as the production of a public good, and can be studied within the framework of public economics.

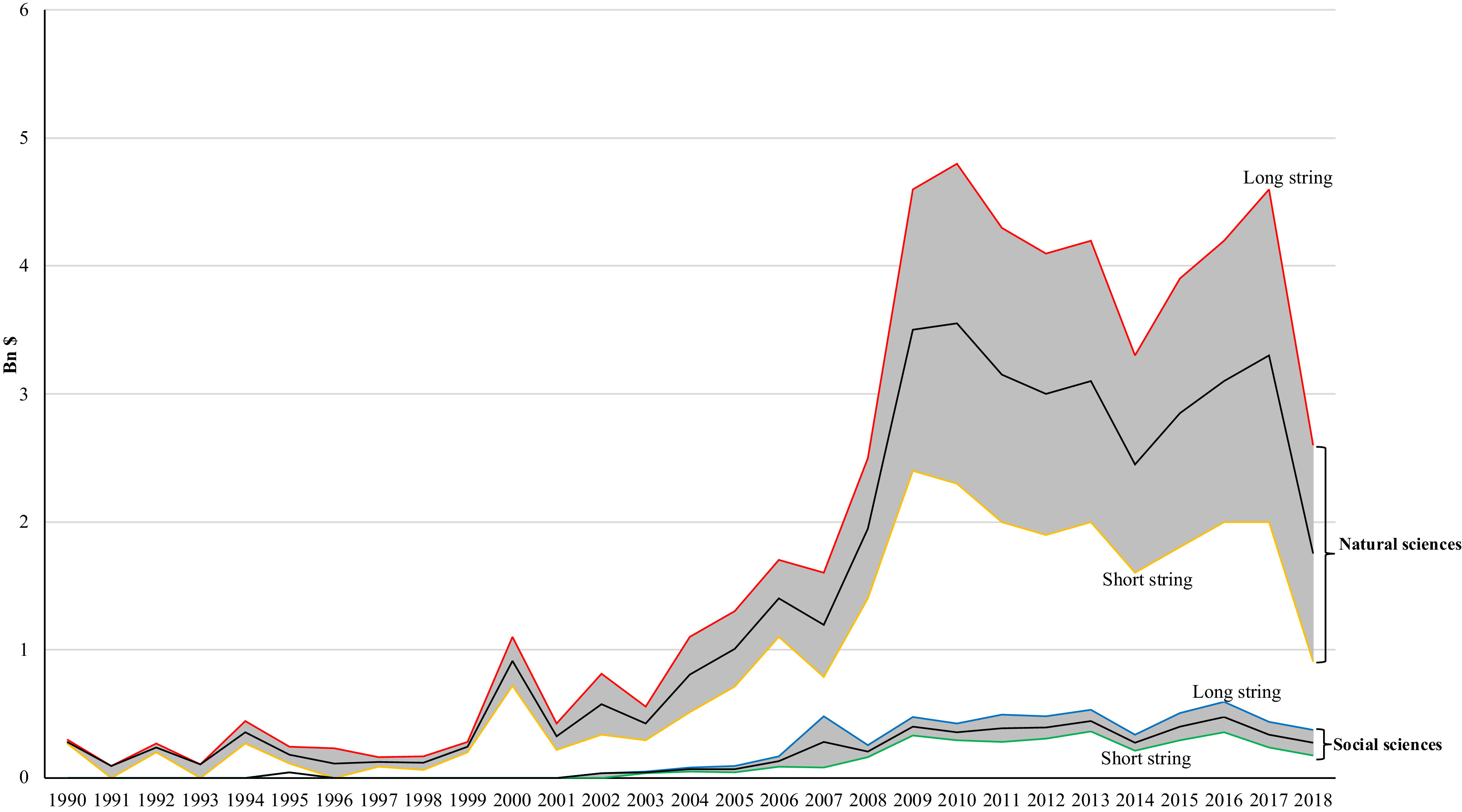
Funding for climate research in the natural and technical sciences and the social sciences and humanities such as policy studies.

However, certain economists argue that a non-market mechanism has developed to correct the problem of indefinable property rights, such that scientists are incentivized to produce knowledge in a socially responsible way. Economist Paula Stephen refers to this mechanism as a reward system based primarily on a concept that she calls "priority of discovery." Robert Merton argues that the goal of scientists is to establish "priority of discovery" by being the first to report a new discovery, which then results in the reward of recognition. The scientific community only bestows this reward on the person who discovers the new piece of knowledge first, and thus this sets up a winner-takes-all type of system that incentivizes producers to participate in the market of scientific knowledge.

Stephen particularly notes that "Compensation in science is generally composed of two parts: one portion is paid regardless of the individual's success in races, the other is priority-based and reflects the value of the winner's contribution to science." The first part that Stephens identifies corresponds to the salary that a professor in academia would expect to make over the course of his or her career; these salaries are notoriously flat, with one study noting that a full professor can expect to make only 70% more than a newly hired assistant professor.

However, Stephen argues that the second part of compensation, that which is reaped when a scientist establishes priority of discovery, then the earnings profile becomes much less flat as the scientist gains prestige, journalistic citations, paid speaking invitations, and other such rewards. However, she notes that this theory had yet to be empirically tested at the time of writing. Furthermore, her analysis only applies to the world of academia, whereas industry is also a major source of scientific knowledge production.

== Government interventions ==
The field of public economics posits that should market failures occur, the government might be able to intervene to correct these market failures. When speaking about the production of scientific knowledge, the government has several options for intervening in the market to attempt to correct the failure. In the United States, two of the most historically popular and most extensively studied options are the patent system and tax incentives.

=== The patent system ===
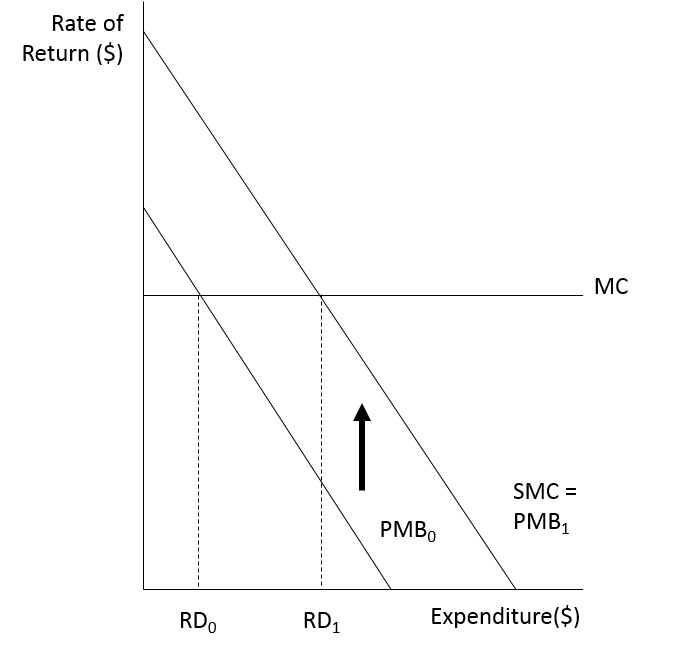
Graphical representation of the effect of patents on production of scientific knowledge.

In the United States, the Patent and Trademark Office issues patents that give the holder of the patent exclusive, defined property rights to their product for 20 years. From an economic perspective, the value of the patent is that it increases the marginal benefit of the firm that is producing the scientific knowledge. To graphically display this concept, the accompanying figure depicts the marginal benefit and marginal cost curves of a firm in the market for science. The vertical axis displays the marginal cost and marginal benefit of each additional dollar spent on research and development. The horizontal axis displays the amount of money spent on research and development in total. Research and development is assumed to have diminishing returns.

For simplicity's sake, all curves are assumed to be linear, and the marginal cost curve is assumed to be constant. A firm will maximize their profits by producing where marginal cost intersects marginal benefit. In the absence of any government intervention, the firm will produce where at RD_{0}, where private marginal benefit (MB_{0}) intersects MC. However, if scientific knowledge is assumed to be a public good, then RD_{0} is too low a quantity to satisfy the social need. The optimal amount of R&D is at RD_{1}. The value of the introduction of the patent system is that it allows the marginal benefit curve for the firm to shift upward to MB_{1} so that the private benefit to the firm now produces the socially optimal quantity. The additional revenue is collected from society, as society now pays higher prices for the knowledge given the monopoly power of the producing firm.

In practice, patent law has been correlated with increased R&D expenditure, indicating that this form of government intervention is in fact incentivizing production. However, this type of government intervention does not allow particularly precise targeting of the optimal level of R&D production, and several economists argue that the benefit of 20 years of monopoly power is too high. This argument has particular relevance to current debates regarding the production of life-saving pharmaceuticals.

=== Tax incentives ===
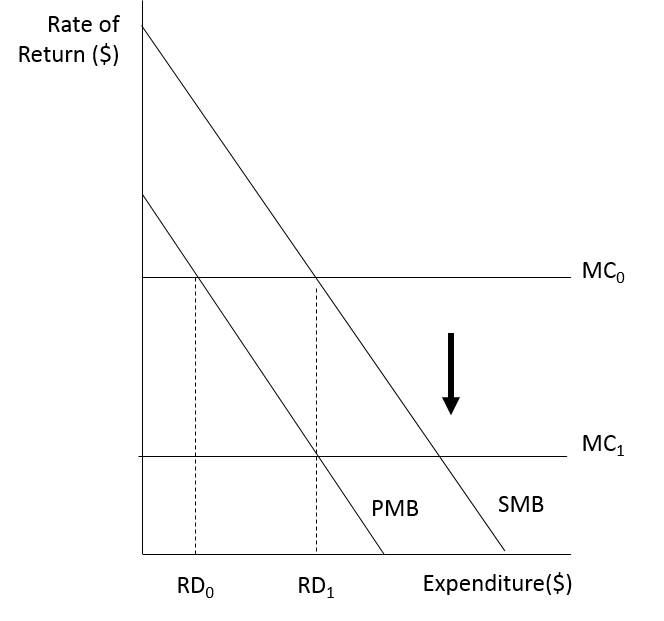
Graphical representation of the effect of tax incentives on production of scientific knowledge.

In 1954, the Internal Revenue Service incorporated an exemption for research costs such that firms could have research costs deducted from their yearly taxes. From an economic perspective, the value of the tax incentive is that it decreases the marginal cost of the firm that is producing the scientific knowledge. To graphically display this concept, the accompanying figure depicts the marginal benefit and marginal cost curves of a firm in the market for science. The vertical axis displays the marginal cost and benefit of each additional dollar spent on research and development. The horizontal axis displays the amount of money spent on research and development in total. Research and development is assumed to have diminishing rate of return.

For simplicity's sake, all curves are assumed to be linear, and the marginal cost curve is assumed to be constant. A firm will maximize their profits by producing where marginal cost intersects marginal benefit. In the absence of any government intervention, the firm will produce where at RD0, where private marginal benefit (PMB0) intersects MC. However, if scientific knowledge is assumed to be a public good, then RD0 is too low a quantity to satisfy the social need. The optimal amount of R&D is at RD1, which is where the marginal cost curve intersects the social marginal benefit (not depicted on this graph). The value of the tax incentive is that it allows the marginal cost curve for the firm to shift downward so that the private cost to the firm now produces the socially optimal quantity. The rest of the cost is now borne by society, in the form of the lost tax revenue.

Tax incentives allow slightly more precise targeting than the patent system. However, the concern still remains that tax incentives exacerbate inequality by producing financial windfalls for firms that might already be very prosperous. Furthermore, empirical studies have been limited, although a 1996 report from the Congressional Office of Technological Assessment found that for every dollar lost in tax revenue, there was a dollar increasing in private R&D spending.

== See also ==
- Author-level metrics
