= Pangi Territory =

Pangi Territory Wilaya ya Pangi (Swahili)
- Territory
- Interactive map of Pangi Territory
- Coordinates: 3.170597°S 26.636052°E
- Country: DR Congo
- Province: Maniema

Area
  - Total: 13,635 km^{2} (5,265 sq mi)
- Time zone: UTC+2 (CAT)

Pangi Territory is an administrative area in Maniema Province of the Democratic Republic of the Congo. The headquarters is the town of Pangi.

The Elila River flows through Pangi territory, entering the Lualaba River to the west. The territory is divided into the Babene chiefdom and the Beia, Ikama, Wakabango and Wasongola sectors. Most of the territory is inhabited by the Lega people, as are the adjoining Mwenga and Shabunda territories. As of 1972 there were still a few Pygmies living among the Baziri tribe of Lega people. Before independence the territory had 97,380 inhabitants of whom 35,518 were in urban and mining agglomerations.

== Sources ==
- Biebuyck, Daniel P. (1973). Lega culture; art, initiation, and moral philosophy among a Central African people. University of California Press. ISBN 0-520-02085-5.
- Blaes, X. (October 2008). "Découpage administratif de la République Démocratique du Congo" (PDF). PNUD-SIG. Archived from the original (PDF) on 2010-04-01.
