= Lega language =

Bantu language spoken in DR Congo

Lega
- Native to: DR Congo
- Ethnicity: Lega
- Native speakers: (450,000 cited 1982–2000)
- Language family: Niger–Congo?: Atlantic–Congo; Benue–Congo; Bantoid; Bantu (Zone D.20); Lega–Binja; Lega–Bemba; Lega

Language codes
- ISO 639-3: Variously: lea – Shabunda Lega lgm – Mwenga Lega khx – Kanu ktf – Kwami
- Glottolog: lega1253
- Guthrie code: D.25,251
- ELP: Kanu

A speaker of the Lega language, also called Kilega

Lega is a Bantu language, or dialect cluster, of the Democratic Republic of the Congo. There are two major varieties, Shabunda Lega, Mwenga Lega. Mwenga Lega, with about 10% of speakers, finds Shabunda difficult to understand.

Variant spellings of 'Lega' are Rega, Leka, Ileka, Kilega, Kirega. Shabunda is also known as Igonzabale, and Mwenga as Shile or Ishile. Gengele is reported to be a Shabunda-based creole.

According to Ethnologue, Bembe is part of the same dialect continuum. Nyindu is a dialect of Shi that has been heavily influenced by Lega.

== Phonology ==
=== Vowels ===
	Front	Central	Back
Close	i		u
Near-close	ɪ		ʊ
Mid	e		o
Open		a	

=== Consonants ===
		Labial	Alveolar	Palatal	Velar
Nasal		m	n	ɲ	ŋ
Plosive	voiceless	p	t		k
Plosive	voiced	b	d	(ɟ)	g
Fricative	voiceless	(f)	s	ʃ	
Fricative	voiced	v	z		
Trill			r		
Lateral			l		
Approximant				j	w

- [ɟ] can also be heard in the consonant sequence /ɡj/.
- /f/ can be heard from loanwords.
