= Lega people =

Ethnic group in the Democratic Republic of the Congo

BaRega/WaRega
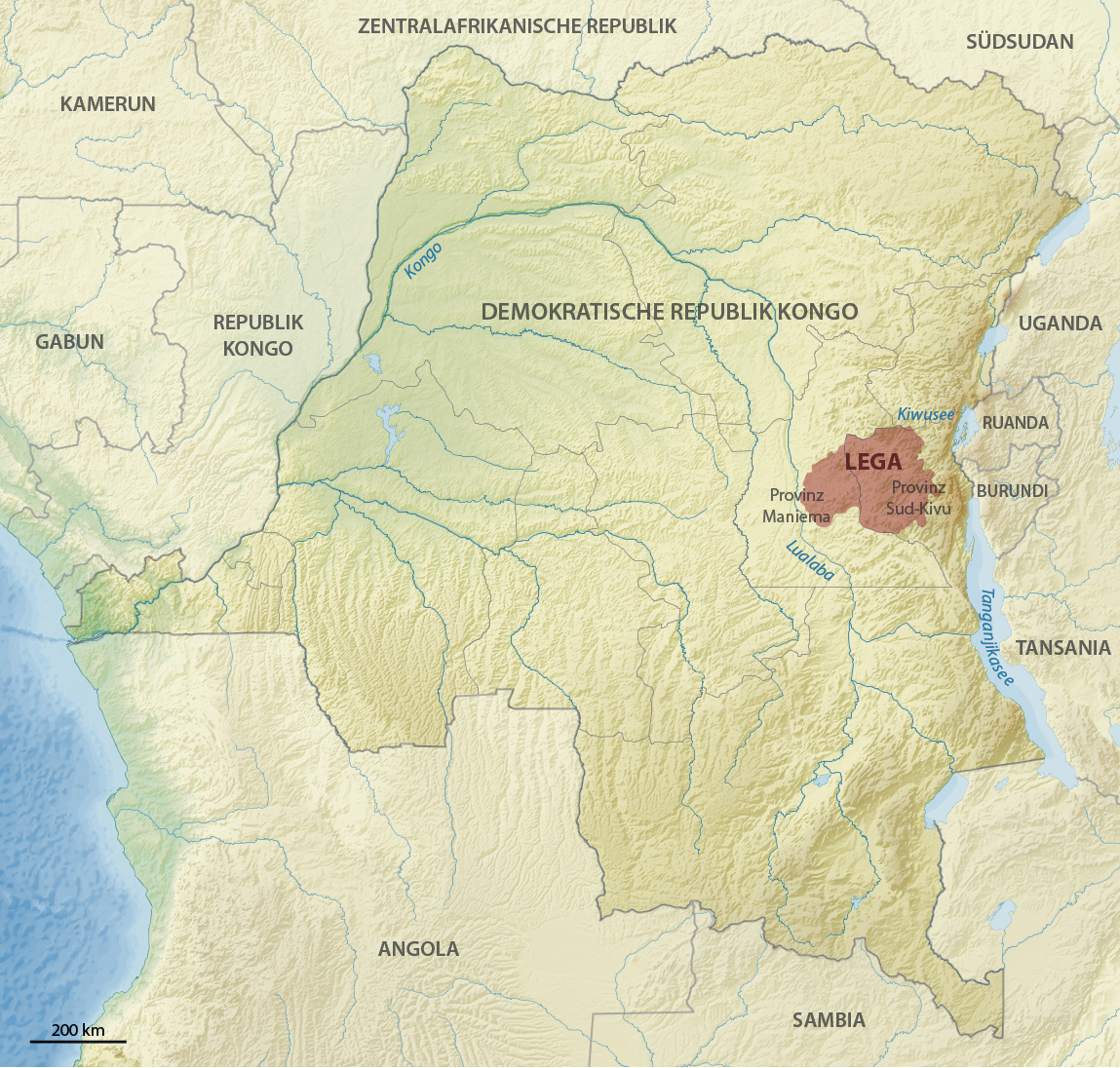
- Location of the Lega people in the Democratic Republic of the Congo

Total population
- 250,000

Regions with significant populations

Languages
- Lega language

The Lega people (also spelled Rega; endonym: WaRega) are a Bantu ethnic group of the Democratic Republic of the Congo. In 1998 their population was about 250,000.

== Location ==
By the 1970s Lega people were mostly living in the middle and upper Elila valley and the upper Ulindi River valley. These rivers both rise in the east of South Kivu and flow in a northwesterly direction through Maniema, joining the Lualaba downstream from Kindu. The upper Ulindi valley has a richly diverse fauna, including many monkey species, chimpanzees, leopards, buffaloes, elephants and antelopes. The valley is administratively divided into the Mwenga and Shabunda territories of South Kivu Province and the Pangi Territory of Maniema Province.

The territory is covered by deep rain forest; in the east, rugged mountains rise to 6,000 feet (1,800 m) or more. The climate is hot and humid year round. Average temperature is 75 °F (24 °C) to 80 °F (27 °C). Annual rainfall is 60 inches (1,500 mm) to 80 inches (2,000 mm). The mountains hold areas of moist woodlands as well as montane forest and grasslands. To the north and west, the forest is denser and deeper. The south of the region is covered with a patchwork of forest savannah and woodland. The entire forest has long been inhabited by humans, who cleared land for cultivation, and then let it return to the wild. In some places, the forest has not grown back but has been replaced by grassland. The forest has abundant wildlife, plus many plants and trees that provide food and are used for other purposes.

== Social structure ==
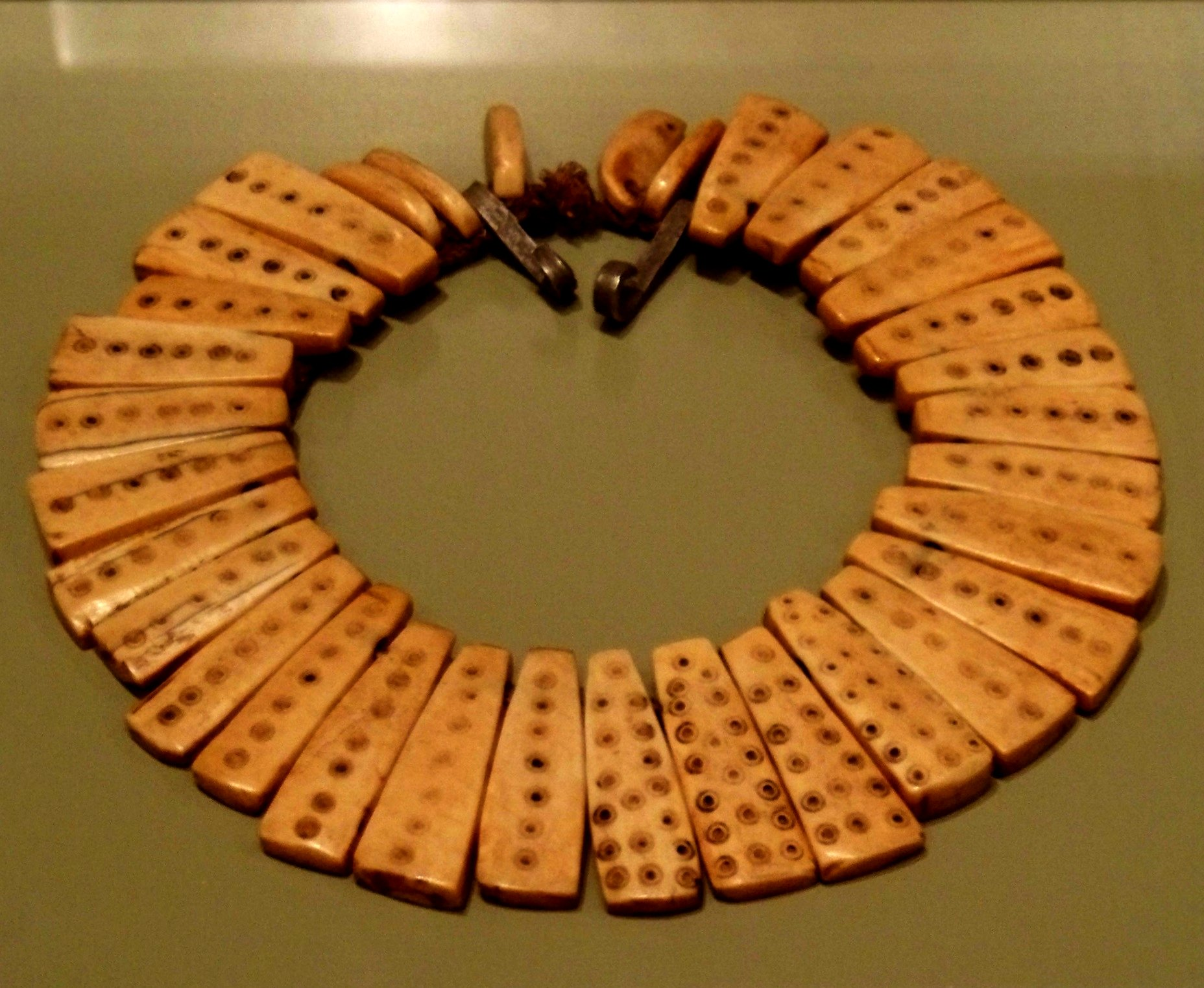
This necklace may have been part of the jewelry belonging to the Bwami religious and social organization. It is made of elephant ivory

The Lega people traditionally live in small village groups, with no central authority. Within a community, a chief inherits his position on a patrilineal basis, and his close relatives have highest rank. Counterbalancing this hereditary structure, the Bwami society also regulates social and political life. This society has seven levels for men and four for women and is open to all. An initiate advances through the ranks through a complex system of instruction, payment and initiation, achieving increasing status. A member of the highest level is recognized as a Kindi, a social leader with great moral authority.

The Lega people are polytheistic. Their gods include Kalaga, the promiser; Kenkunga, the reassembler; Ombe, the hidden; Kaginga, the incarnation of evil. Kaginga assists sorcerers, but Bwami membership can protect an individual against the evil doings of witches.

== History ==
The Lega people originated in what is today Uganda and started to migrate from there to their present location in the 16th century. They were fierce warriors, conquering the people whose territory they entered and imposing many of their customs. By the mid-1800s the Lega were surrounded by Arab / Swahili slave posts. Although none of these posts was within the Lega territory, they were constantly threatened by slave raids. For most of the period of the Congo Free State (1885–1908), the Lega territory was within the area that Tippu Tip and his successors had reserved. For a period two Arab agents of the Free State, Munie Chabodu and Munie Mtoro ruled the Lega and collected tribute in the form of rubber and ivory. They established towns at Micici on the Elila, Shabunda on the Ulindi, and Mulungu in the mountains.

During the 1890s, the Free State fought a series of campaigns in which they drove away from the Arab slavers, and established government posts near Micici and Shabunda. The territory was not fully occupied until the 1900s. Under the Belgian Congo (1908–1960) the Lega were organized into chiefdoms, sectors, and territories, changes that were neither resisted nor welcomed by the Lega. This new system was more hierarchical and introduced a form of hereditary succession. However, the Belgians were never entirely able to root out the customary power that resided in clan and village chiefs. Catholic missionaries arrived in the 1910s and the first Protestant mission was founded in 1922 in Shabunda. Mining began in eastern Legaland in 1923, with further mines opened in the 1930s, employing many young Lega. Often they took a job only for a short period to earn enough money for some purpose such as Bwami initiation or marriage.

In 1933 the Belgian authorities banned Bwami, and they prohibited the society again in 1948. The Bwami continued underground and was officially recognized again in 1958, shortly before decolonization, but by then much of the tradition of art production had been lost. The Congo became independent in 1960. The regime of Mobutu Sese Seko (1965-1997) was harsh and corrupt, and Mobutu was eventually ousted in the First Congo War (1996-1997). This was soon followed by the Second Congo War (1998-2003) in which rebels attempted to overthrow his successor, Laurent-Désiré Kabila. The Lega territory was the scene of many violent conflicts during this period.

In the mid-2000s, parts of the South Kivu region saw the emergence of the Raia Mutomboki, a decentralized network of militias, originally founded to defend villages against FDLR atrocities. The Lega were the dominant ethnic group in the area where the Raia Mutomboki originated. Researchers such as Jason Stearns and Christoph Vogel have stated that the traditionally horizontal structure of Lega society help explain the Raia Mutomboki's fragmentation and decentralization.

== Economy ==
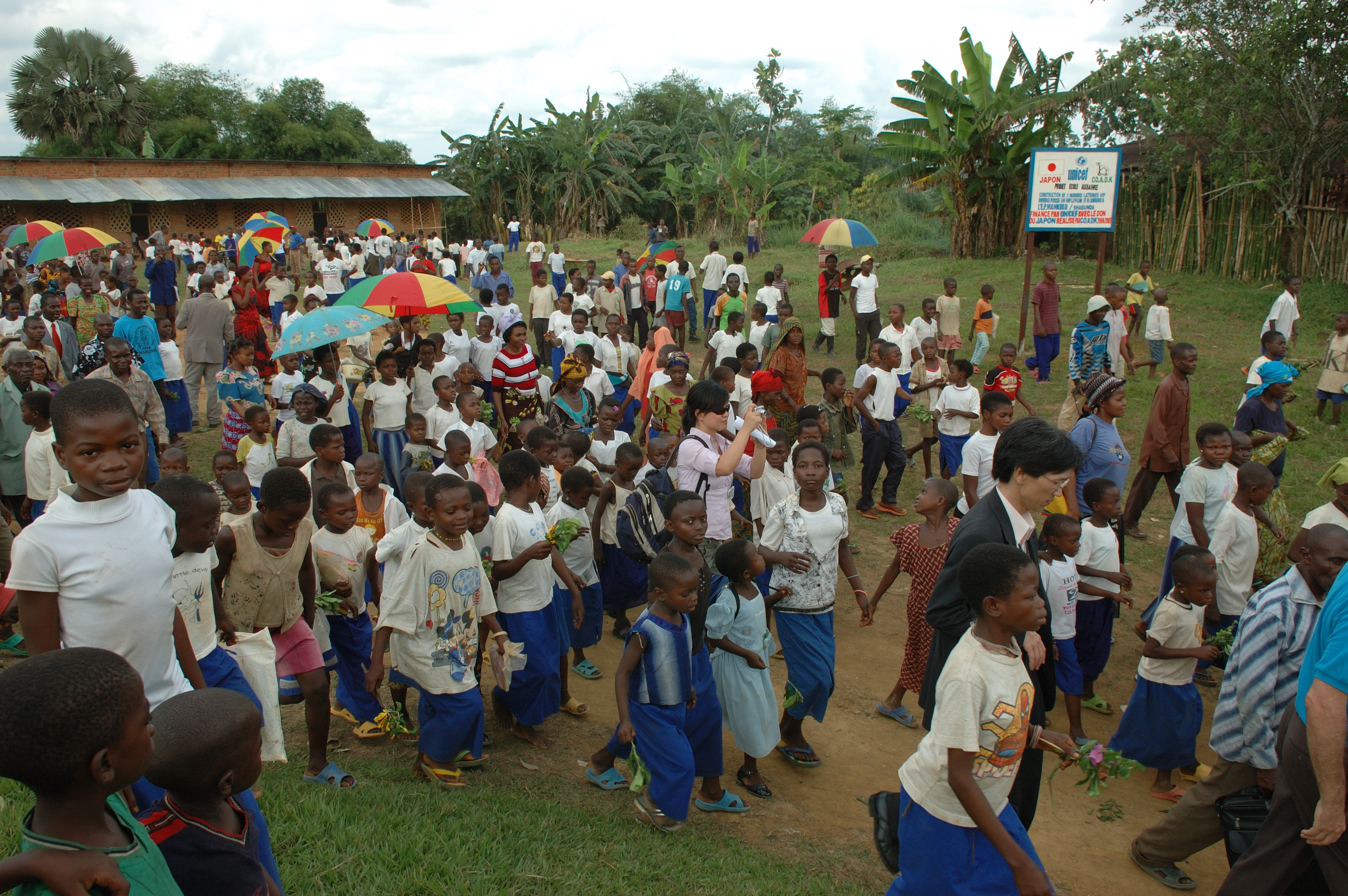
Crowd at Shabundu, May 2007, after the visit of the Japanese ambassador

The Lega traditionally lived by hunting and gathering, exploiting the rich resources of the forest. When possible, they roast their food. The women are in charge of cooking. If it is not raining, they will cook outside on a hearth formed from slow-burning logs that support a pot over the fire. In poor weather they cook in kitchens within the long houses. The men eat as a group in the men's house, and the women eat with the young children in or outside the kitchen.

The Lega villagers were forced by the colonial administration to produce manioc, bananas, and rice to feed the miners, causing considerable disruption to their lifestyle. In more recent years, the Lega have taken to panning for gold in the rivers and working in the iron ore mines of the region.

== Art ==
Bwami masks and figures are symbols of the owner's rank within the Bwami society. The objects represent moral or social values, and are used during initiation rites. The Bwami works of art are often associated with proverbs, and these proverbs in conjunction with dance, poetry and song give wisdom to members of the society. Beauty, knowledge and power are intertwined.

Some artwork can only be seen, handled or owned by the highest grades of the society. The objects are typically small and simple in form, and have a striking patina that derives from being handled or worn on the body. Ivory objects usually have russet or yellow patinas. The masks are fairly standardized, although the most important masks with special ritual use or symbolic meaning may have distinctive design. A typical mask will have a concave heart-shaped face. The forehead protrudes slightly, the nose is narrow, eyes are slits and the mouth is slightly open. Every time a mask is used it is rubbed with white clay, over time acquiring a white patina.

The Lega carve anthropomorphic figures out of wood and ivory. Some of these figures are full-figure representations, while others are just heads or busts. These distinctions of form are not meaningful to the Lega. The Lega categorize and ascribe significance to each carved figure in a way that cannot be discerned by an outsider. If an anthropomorphic figure is removed from the Lega community without properly inquiring about and recording the name and meaning of the work, there is no way to know later how the Lega might have categorized the figure.

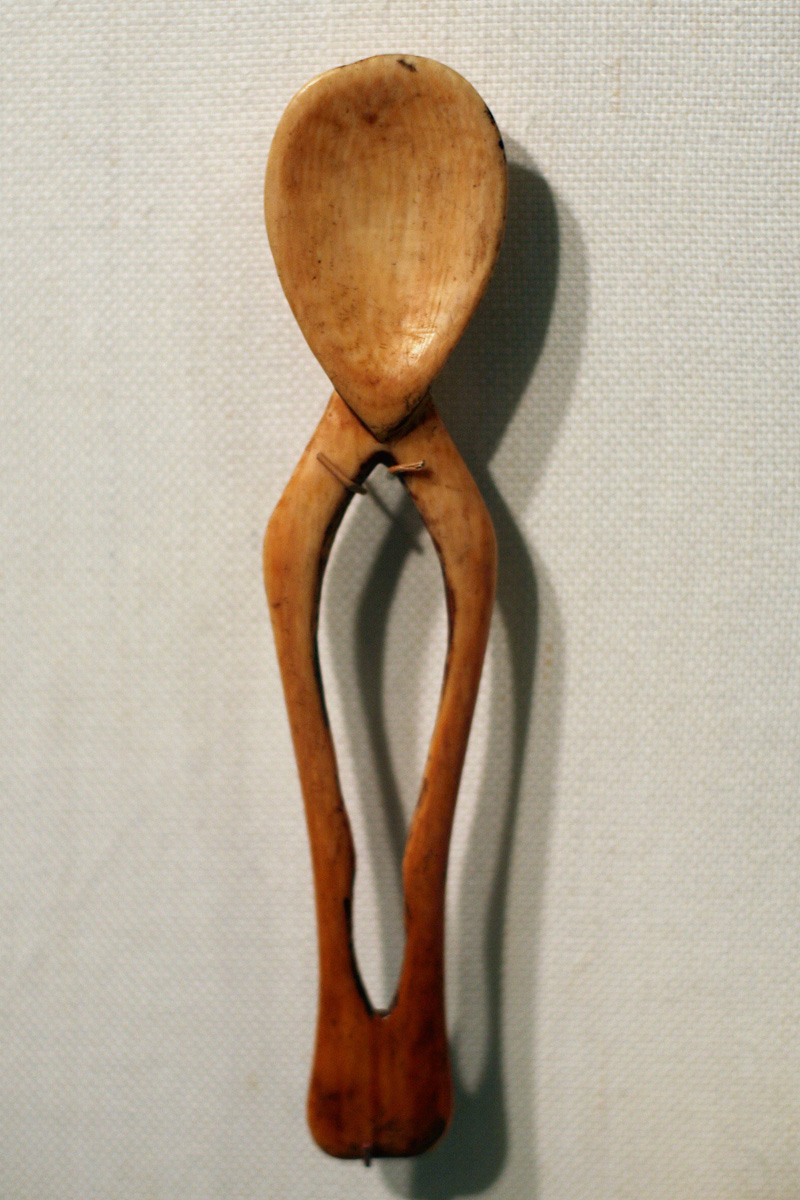
Spoon (Kalukili), late 19th or early 20th century. Ivory

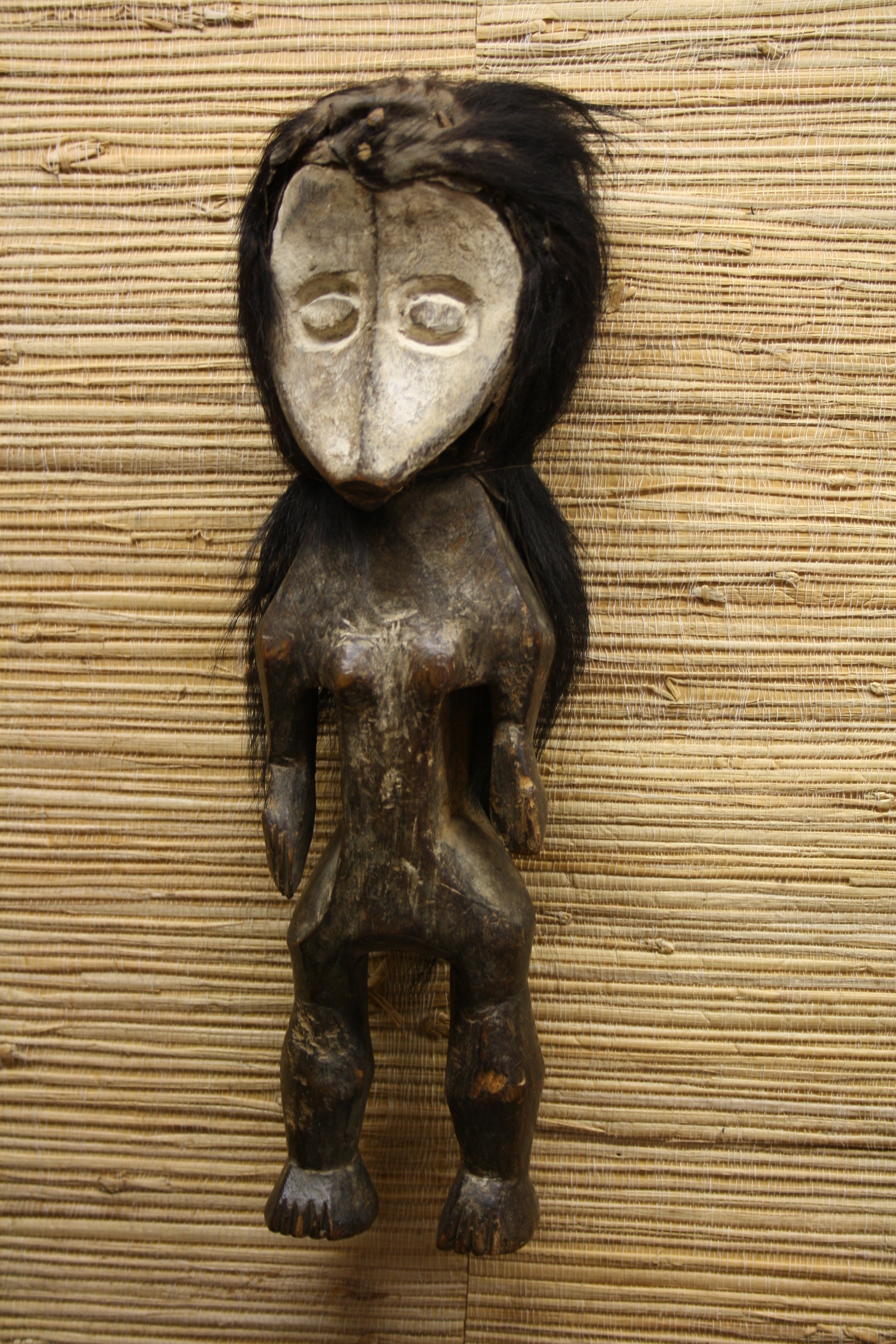
Symbol of bwame

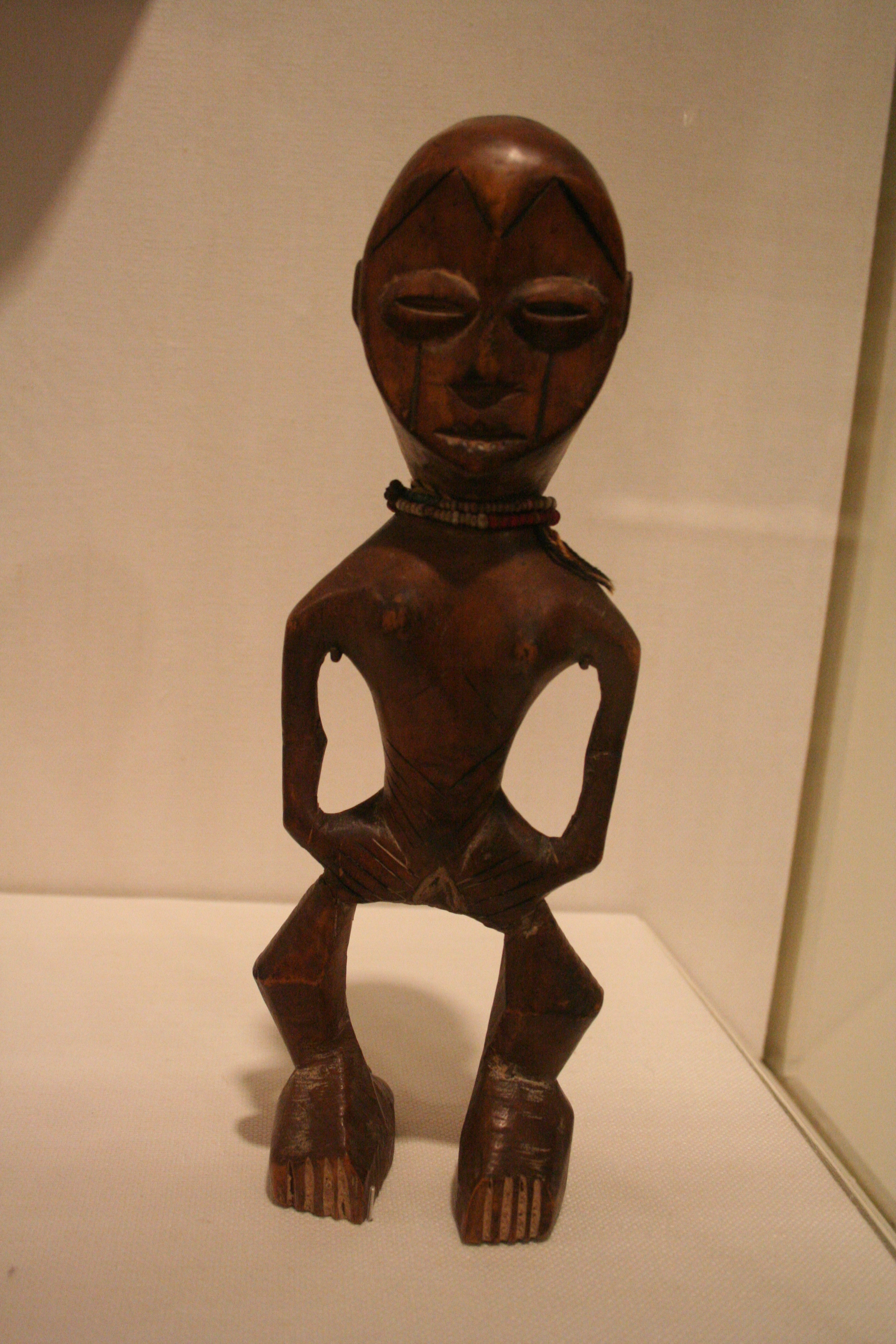
Figure (Iginga), late 19th or early 20th century. Wood, plastic beads

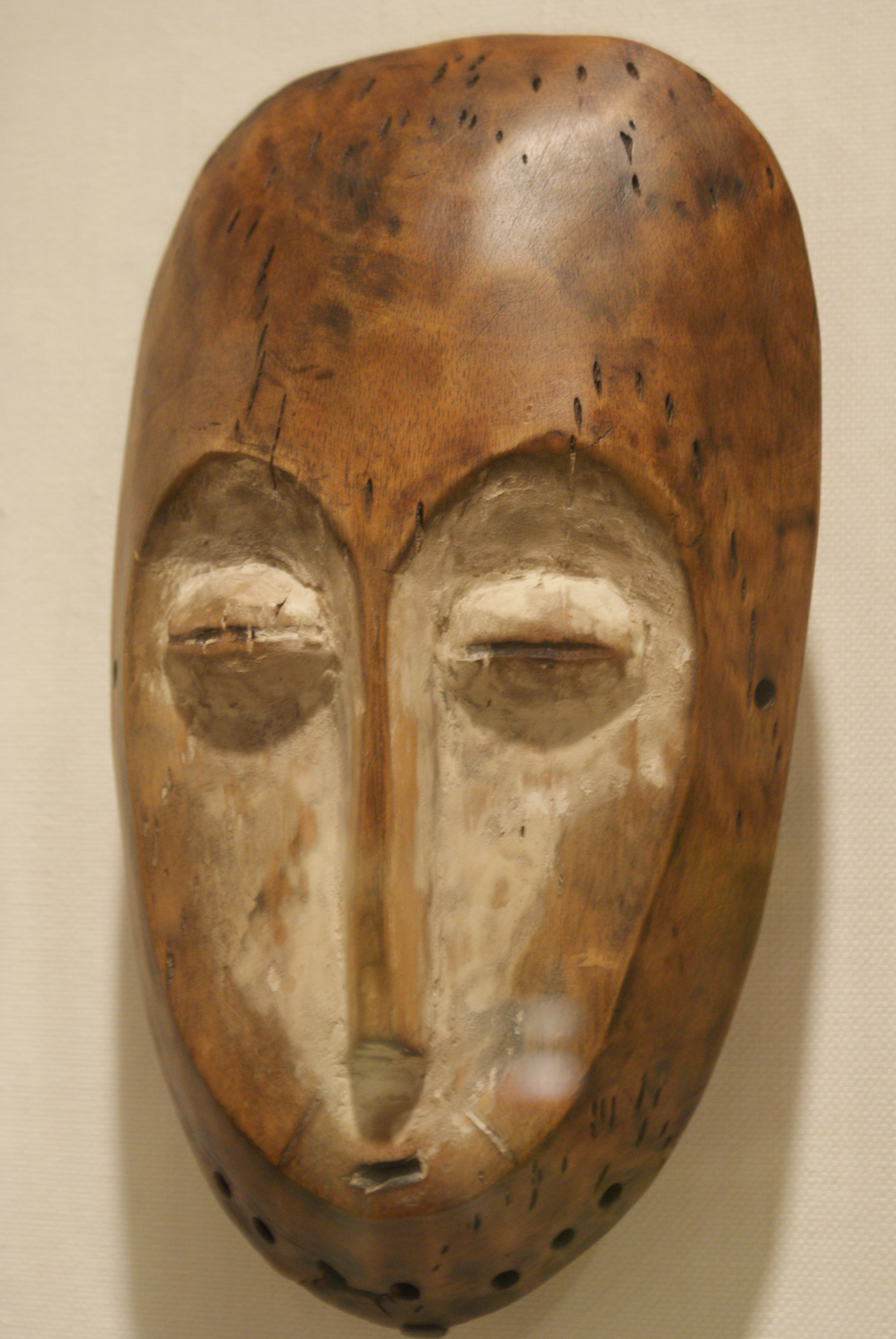
Oval-shaped Face Mask, 19th or 20th century. Wood, pigment (kaolin?)

== Sources ==
- Biebuyck, Daniel P. (1973). Lega culture; art, initiation, and moral philosophy among a Central African people. University of California Press. ISBN 0-520-02085-5.
- Blaes, X. (October 2008). "Découpage administratif de la République Démocratique du Congo" (PDF). PNUD-SIG. Archived from the original (PDF) on 2010-04-01.
- Elisofon, Eliot (1967). "Lega woman cooking in the open air, Mulanga village, Congo (Democratic Republic)". Smithsonian.
- Grootaers, Jan-Lodewijk (2003). "Lega: Ethics and Beauty in the Heart of Africa". African Arts. 36: 84–96. doi:10.1162/afar.2003.36.1.84. Archived from the original on 2011-12-29.
- "Lega Bwami masks-Congo". BuyAfricanAntiques. Archived from the original on 2011-12-29.
- "Lega Information". University of Iowa. 3 November 1998. Archived from the original on 11 January 2012.
- "Major Exhibition of African Sculpture by the Lega Peoples of the Democratic Republic of Congo at UMMA Oct 16-Jan 1". University of Michigan Museum of Art. 2004. Archived from the original on 2016-03-21.
