= Shabunda Territory =

Shabunda Wilaya ya Shabunda (Swahili)
- Territory
- Territoire de Shabunda
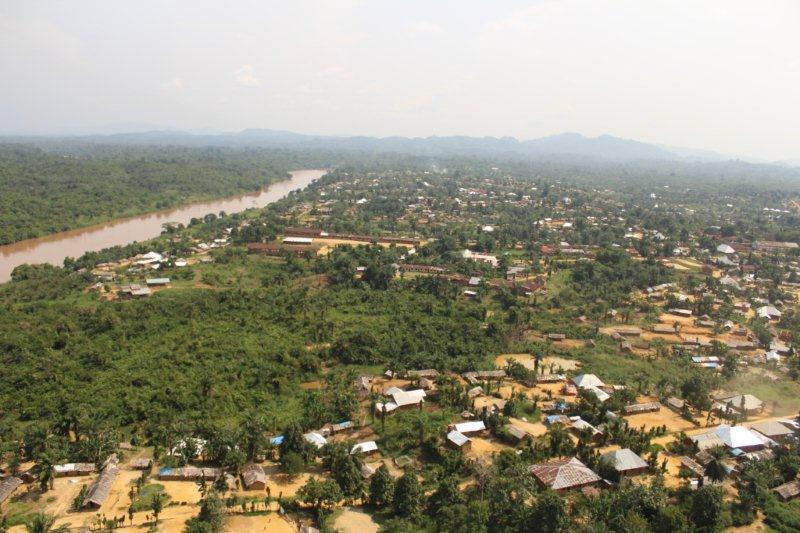
- An air view of Shabunda, showing both the city and the river Ulindi
- Interactive map of Shabunda
- Location within Democratic Republic of the Congo
- Coordinates: 3.1°S 27.5°E
- Country: DR Congo
- Province: South Kivu
- HQ: Shabunda
- Time zone: UTC+2 (CAT)

Shabunda Territory is an administrative territory of South Kivu Province in the Democratic Republic of the Congo. Its administrative centre is the town of Shabunda. Covering approximately 25,216 km², it is the largest territory in South Kivu Province. The territory is characterized by extensive tropical forests, a dense river network, significant mineral resources, and a long history of armed conflict and political instability.

According to the Humanitarian Exchange Magazine, in 2002 it was "home to over a million people. The administrative centre, Shabunda, is nearly 3,000 km from the capital, Kinshasa. There are no postal services and no radio. Only landing strips keep the territory from being completely cut off". It is possible to access Shabunda by motorbike from Kindu but it is a two-day trip.

In June 1997 reports surfaced of a massacre of refugees in February that year at a bridge over the Ulindi River just north of the town of Shabunda. The refugees included unarmed civilians and armed Hutu fighters who had been involved in the 1994 massacre of Tutsis in Rwanda. They were attacked by Rwandan Tutsi troops who were fighting with the rebel forces of Laurent Kabila to overthrow the dictator Mobutu Sese Seko. Witnesses said that hundreds of people were killed.

In 2022 water supply was established in the centre of Shabunda. There had been no water supply there for 100 years.

== Geography ==
=== Location and boundaries ===
Shabunda Territory is located in the western part of South Kivu Province. It borders:

- Punia and Walikale territories to the north;
- Kalehe, Kabare, Walungu and Mwenga territories to the east;
- Kasongo, Kabambare and Fizi territories to the south; and
- Pangi and Kailo territories to the west.

The territory extends between approximately 27° and 28° east longitude and 2° and 4° south latitude. It lies within the transition toward the Congo Basin's equatorial forest and receives abundant rainfall throughout much of the year. Its area represents approximately 40% of the total area of South Kivu Province according to figures contained in a local administrative study.

=== Hydrography ===
Shabunda is crossed by several major rivers belonging to the Lualaba drainage system. The Ulindi and Elila are the principal rivers.

The Elila flows from east to west and has tributaries including the Simunambi, Lwimo and Kilombwe. The Ulindi also flows generally westward and receives tributaries including the Kindi and Lugulu. The Lugulu, in turn, receives the Nduma and Lubimbe rivers and forms an important drainage basin in the northern part of the territory.

=== Forests ===
Shabunda is predominantly forested. According to Global Forest Watch data reproduced in the source material, natural forest covered approximately 2.4 million hectares, or 97% of the territory's land area, in 2020. Forest loss has nevertheless continued, with approximately 11,000 hectares of natural forest lost in 2025 according to the same dataset.

== Politics ==
Shabunda Territory is represented in the National Assembly by two deputies:

- Benjamin Mukulungu (PPPD)
- Mwenebantu Amuri (NAD)
