= Mbinga-Sud =

- Grouping
- Groupement de Mbinga-Sud
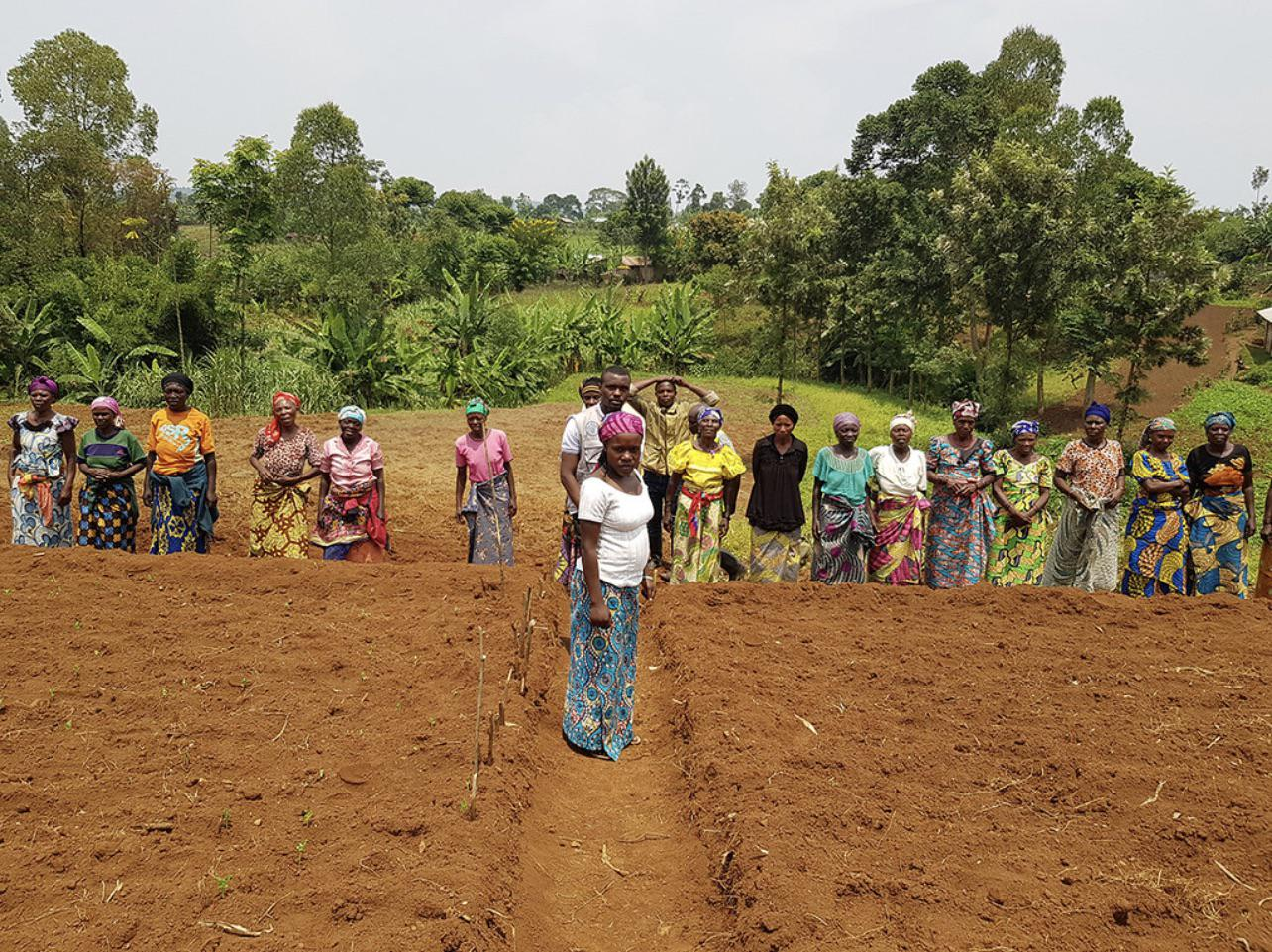
- Kasheke, Mbinga-Sud
- Country: Democratic Republic of the Congo
- Province: South Kivu
- Territory: Kalehe
- Chiefdom: Buhavu
- Administrative seat: Kasheke

Area
  - Total: 369 km^{2} (142 sq mi)

Population (2012 est.)
  - Total: 136,575
- Official language: French
- National language: Kiswahili

Mbinga-Sud is one of the seven groupements of the Buhavu Chiefdom, located in Kalehe Territory in the South Kivu province, eastern Democratic Republic of the Congo. It covers an area of approximately 369 square kilometers and had an estimated population of 136,575 as of 2012. Its administrative seat is Kasheke.

Mbinga-Sud is bordered by Lake Kivu to the east, the Irhambi-Katana groupement (in Kabare Territory) to the west, and the Mbinga-Nord groupement to the north. It is administratively divided into ten localités (villages): Bushushu, Cibanda (or Chibandja), Cibanja (or Ibinja), Ihoka, Iko, Munanira, Kasheke, Ishovu, Tchofi, and Muhongoza. The groupement also includes several islets in Lake Kivu, notably Ishungu, Ibidja, Iko, Ihoka, and Cime.

== Geography ==
=== Relief, climate, and vegetation ===
Mbinga-Sud is characterized by a rugged and highly dissected relief, typical of the western escarpments of the Albertine Rift in the eastern Democratic Republic of the Congo. The landscape is composed of mountains, hills, plateaus, steep slopes, and marshy depressions intersected by many streams. Areas of flat terrain are limited and are mostly found near Lake Kivu's shoreline and in low-lying zones on the western slopes of the Mitumba Mountains.

Due to its location along the Mitumba Mountains, the groupement experiences a mountain climate with a long rainy season extending from September to May, and a shorter dry season lasting from June to August. Average annual rainfall ranges between 1,300 and 1,680 mm, although higher levels, which reach around 2,000 mm, have been recorded in western areas of Kalehe Territory. Temperatures are generally lower in the western highland and forested zones, while more moderate conditions prevail in the eastern areas, influenced by the proximity of Lake Kivu. The vegetation is dominated by dense forests in the west, though deforestation has significantly reduced them, which has given way to grassland and savanna.

=== Hydrography and soil ===
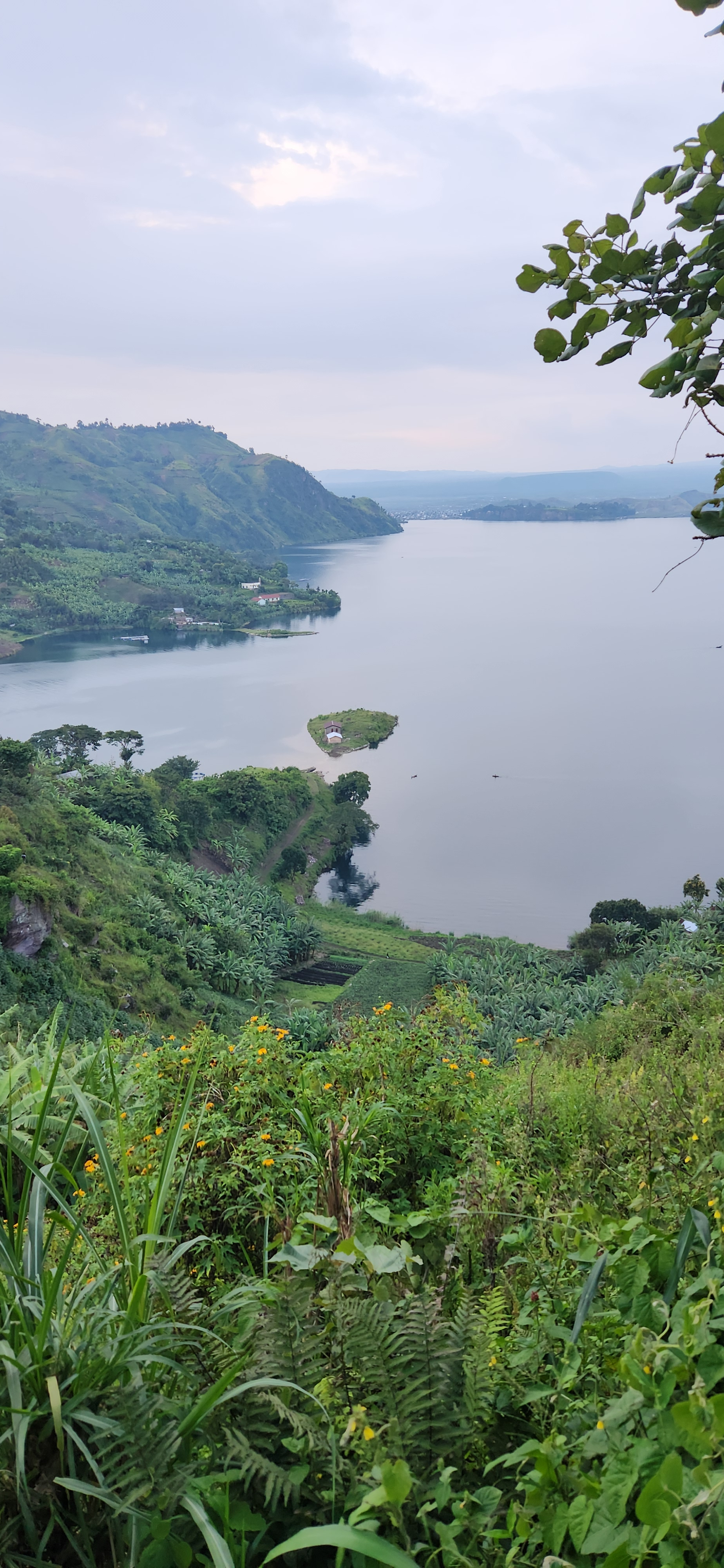
View of Lake Kivu from Kalehe Territory.

Mbinga-Sud is partly bordered and influenced by Lake Kivu, whose waters supply several lakeside villages, including Ishovu, Ihoka, Iko, Ibindja, and Cime. The lake extends along the southeastern part of the groupement and continues northward. Inland, water resources are derived from numerous springs, streams, and rivers. Principal waterways include the Nyabarongo, Nyakashungula, Cibira, Kangola, Ntungulu, Ndindi, Luzira, Sangano, Nyamikubi, Nyamuhondo, and Lwanjoka rivers.

Soil types differ across the area, with clay-sandy soils found in the villages of Bushushu and parts of Munanira, while heavier clay soils dominate upland areas such as hills, mountains, slopes, and lake islets. These soils are particularly prone to erosion and leaching, especially in steep areas. As is common throughout the Congo Basin, non-volcanic soils generally lack sufficient nutrients and humus.

=== Governance and administration ===
Mbinga-Sud is governed under the customary administrative system of the Buhavu Chiefdom. The chief authority is the chef de groupement, who represents the Mwami (paramount chief) and serves as the primary local leader. This office is typically passed down through a hereditary lineage and involves administrative functions and the enforcement of customary laws. A council of elders supports the chef de groupement by advising on decisions and safeguarding traditional customs. The justice system combines customary practices with delegated authority and resolves minor disputes at the local level while directing more serious cases to higher customary leadership under the Mwami.

Mbinga-Sud is administratively subdivided into ten localités (villages), each headed by a chef de localité (village chief), who acts as an intermediary between the local population and the chef de groupement.

| No. | Localités (villages) |
|---|---|
| 1. | Ishovu |
| 2. | Ihoka |
| 3. | Iko |
| 4. | Muhongoza |
| 5. | Tchofi |
| 6. | Bushushu |
| 7. | Munanira |
| 8. | Cibanda (also known as Chibandja) |
| 9. | Cibanja (also known as Ibinja) |
| 10 | Kasheke |

A 2016 record listing the local chiefs along with the villages they oversee:

| Names of chiefs | Villages |
|---|---|
| Ciringa Cinakonda | Bushushu |
| Muhini Lemera | Muhongoza |
| Kabudika Lushombo | Munanira |
| Robert Baharanyi | Cibanda (also known as Chibandja) |
| Habamungu Chitambara | Kasheke |
| Mastaki Zamu | Tchofi |
| François Mbayu Ndeko | Ihoka |
| Celestin Magadju | Ishovu |
| Ngurube Akizimwami | Iko |
| Shangi Buchekabiri | Cibanja (also known as Ibinja) |

== Demographics ==
=== Population ===
According to the 2012 annual territorial census report of Kalehe Territory, Mbinga-Sud had an estimated population of 136,575, distributed across several of its villages, with Bushushu being the most populous, with a total of 25,186 residents:

| Villages) | Men | Women | Boys | Girls | Total |
|---|---|---|---|---|---|
| Bushushu | 5,529 | 5,640 | 6,502 | 7,515 | 25,186 |
| Muhongoza | 1,873 | 2,025 | 2,295 | 2,575 | 8,769 |
| Munanira | 4,793 | 5,630 | 5,861 | 6,257 | 22,541 |
| Cibanda (also known as Chibandja) | 3,187 | 3,272 | 3,754 | 3,566 | 13,779 |
| Kasheke | 3,421 | 4,116 | 7,920 | 8,784 | 24,241 |
| Tchofi | 1,529 | 1,888 | 2,721 | 3,029 | 9,167 |
| Ishovu | 1,447 | 1,543 | 1,874 | 1,932 | 6,796 |
| Ihoka | 1,109 | 1,178 | 1,220 | 1,376 | 4,883 |
| Iko | 1,402 | 1,425 | 1,820 | 1,798 | 6,445 |
| Cibanja (also known as Ibinja) | 3,022 | 3,132 | 4,200 | 4,411 | 14,768 |
| Total | 27,312 | 29,849 | 38,167 | 41,244 | 136,575 |

Mbinga-Sud has a highly diverse population, with the Bahavu clan of the Bashi people forming the dominant group. The Batwa live mainly along the forest edges in places such as Nyandera, Tchinji, Mandari, Bishulishuli, Fazili, Musinga, Buzingo, Musiku, Bulanga, Tchamula, and Bukungu. Other ethnic groups in the area include the Batembo, Barega, Bafuliiru, Babembe, Bahunde, Bakusu, Bangala, Banyarwanda, and Barundi. Some of these communities are further organized into smaller local subunits. The mineral-rich lands of Nyawarongo and Kairinge are mainly occupied by the Bashi and Bahutu.

The groupement has experienced significant migratory movements, particularly among the most active age groups, which have contributed to an increase in the number of Rwandan Hutu and Tutsi, as well as Burundians, in the high plateaus of Kalehe Territory. These movements have also been influenced by periods of conflict and population displacement, and, over time, the population has increasingly concentrated in the villages due to rural exodus, as residents largely depend on agriculture and livestock rearing. Many people, particularly the youth, migrate to the cities of Bukavu in South Kivu and Goma in North Kivu in search of education, employment, and better living conditions.

=== Healthcare, religion, and recreation ===
Mbinga-Sud is located within the Kalehe Health Zone (Zone de santé de Kalehe), 65 km from the city of Bukavu. In 1998, the Kalehe Hospital Center (Centre hospitalier de Kalehe; CHK) was inaugurated, later becoming the general reference hospital (hôpital de référence général) overseeing 15 health centers (centre de santé), three maternity wards, and three health posts (postes de santé). This development significantly improved access to healthcare, with support from the Diocesan Office of Medical Works (bureau diocésain des œuvres médicales; BDOM). Before this, residents often had to travel to FOMULAC-Katana to obtain medical services. All facilities are supervised by the FOMULAC-Katana Health Zone.

Christianity is the dominant religion, with significant representation of Catholic and Protestant communities, as well as Jehovah's Witnesses. There are some adherents of traditional animist beliefs, particularly in the mountainous regions. Islam and other religious practices are also present.

Association football is the most popular recreational activity, particularly among youth. Several local football clubs are active in the area, including Mapinduzi Sport, Nyota Sport, Tout Puissant Sport, Bushushu Sport, Saint Esprit Sport, Shosho Sport, and Libanga Sport. There's also some karate clubs.

== History ==
The first inhabitants of Mbinga-Sud were Pygmy ethnic groups who subsisted through hunting, gathering in the dense forests, and fishing. They lived without administrative organization until the consolidation of authority by the Mwami (paramount chief) of Buhavu Chiefdom, Ntale I.

Mwami Ntale I established his initial stronghold in Ishovu before expanding his control to Munanira, which was a newly acquired territory. After this expansion, he delegated authority to his son, Prince Jules Lushombo, who in turn left Munanira, the place where the "Busomi" resided, to settle in Kasheke, which remains the administrative seat of Mbinga-Sud. Since that time, the groupement has been governed by two chiefs: Lushombo Kamirogosa and Jules Lushombo, son of Joli, the current incumbent. These chiefs act as representatives of the Mwami within the groupement, and exercise customary authority over local affairs. The chief allocates land in the Mwami's name and collects a traditional tribute known as Kalinzi from the population.

== Economy ==
=== Agriculture ===
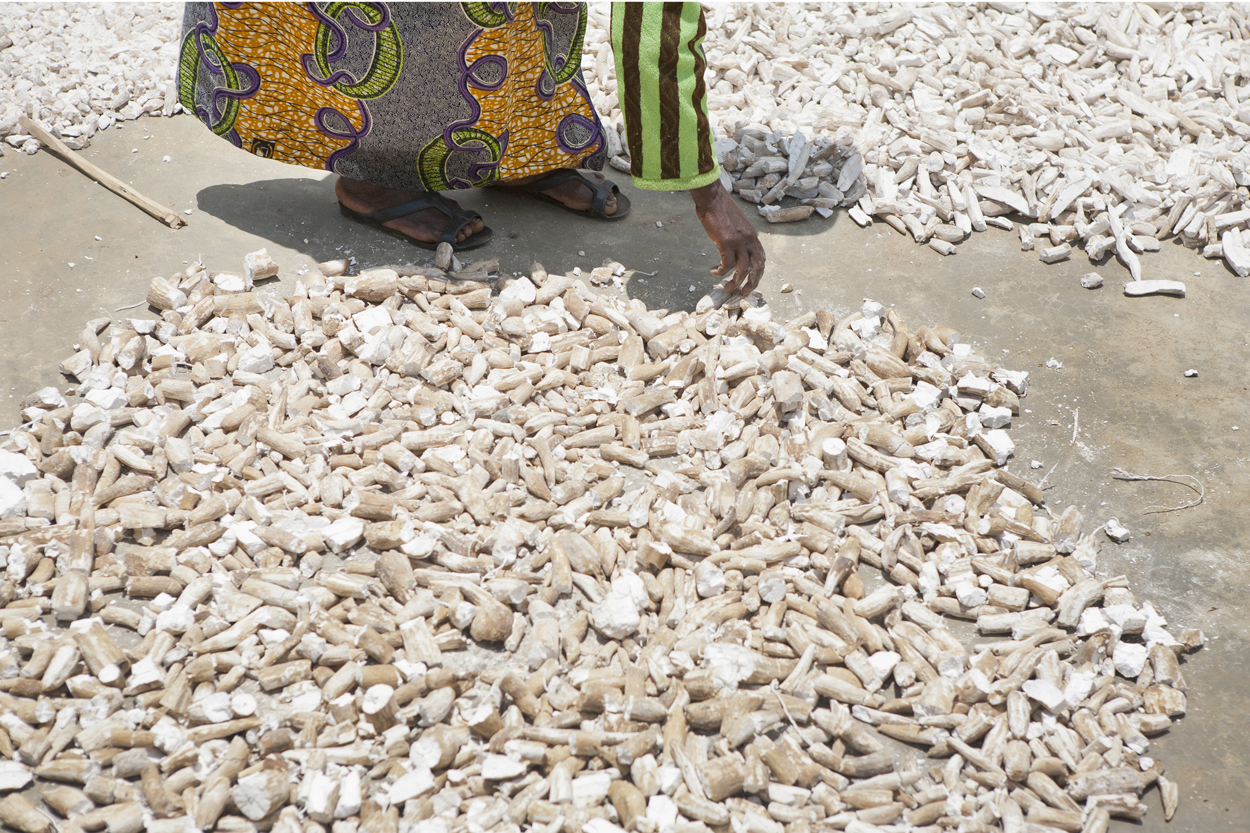
Locals drying harvested cassava pieces under the sun in Kalehe Territory.

Agriculture is Mbinga-Sud's primary economic activity, where the majority of the population lives in rural areas. It serves as the main source of income for local farmers and supports essential household needs, including food, clothing, healthcare, housing, and education. The groupement's farmland is largely devoted to subsistence crops, with bananas, cassava, and beans being the most common. On the high plateaus, farmers cultivate vegetables, peas, and potatoes. Other crops include fava beans, sweet potatoes, sorghum, and maize. Cassava is the most widely traded agricultural product, while bananas are the second most important crop and play a key role in direct trade with Rwanda. Banana is also used locally to produce the traditional fermented banana beverage known as kasikisi (or Kasiksi). Coffee is grown as a perennial plantation crop and exported to Rwanda, while beans, peanuts, and maize are primarily cultivated for local consumption.

2021 statistical data on subsistence crop production in Kalehe Territory:

| Year | Cassava | Maize | Bananas | Beans | Peanuts | Sweet potato | Potato | Sorghum | Saja |
|---|---|---|---|---|---|---|---|---|---|
| 2014 | 67,280 | 6,218 | 7,910 | 5,720 | 1,655 | 1,745 | 720 | 240 | 218 |
| 2015 | 62,340 | 5,484 | 7,857 | 4,668 | 1,633 | 1,721 | 705 | 233 | 223 |
| 2016 | 61,304 | 5,430 | 8,892 | 6,929 | 9,970 | 984 | 700 | 211 | 209 |
| 2017 | 61,400 | 5,020 | 7,573 | 4,536 | 915 | 820 | 680 | 191 | 266 |
| 2018 | 59,489 | 5,000 | 6,507 | 4,110 | 913 | 817 | 570 | 179 | 273 |
| 2019 | 1,789,314 | 39,863 | 46,841 | 21,340 | 19,725 | 53,122 | 74,982 | 35,107 | 1,843 |
| 2020 | 1,881,744 | 43,194 | 51,392 | 29,001 | 20,331 | 57,114 | 63,014 | 2,934 | 2,003 |
| 2021 | 1,973,397 | 30,832 | 40,122 | 40,122 | 12,252 | 27,933 | 19,739 | 1,184 | 987 |

Since the 1970s, farmers have increasingly focused on cash crops like quinine because of their higher market value and demand in industrial markets. The focus on cash crops and market-oriented agriculture has brought social and environmental consequences, including soil degradation, reduced food security, and challenges for a population largely dependent on agriculture for subsistence.

==== Land tenure, livestock farming, and development associations ====
The land tenure system is feudal, with all land formally owned by the Mwami, who is the sole authority able to grant land use rights to people, and land acquisition is traditionally governed by customary practices, the most important of which are:

- Kalinzi: A payment made for the right to use land. The payment is usually made in kind, such as a cow or a goat, and reflects the location of the land and the relationship between the landholder and the Mwami. Acquiring land under this system is considered an inheritance.
- Bwasa: Under this arrangement, a farmer rents land (a field) from another cultivator for a short period. The payment is also made in kind, and the land is not considered part of an inheritance; only subsistence crops are permitted.

In recent decades, the Kalinzi system has declined, as some plantations are sold to private individuals or transferred by the state, for example to Pharmakina or the Comité Anti-Bwaki. Farmers now mainly use the Bwasa system, typically applied for a renewable season on a demarcated plot of 50 square meters, often in exchange for collateral. At the territorial level, a formal cadastral system also exists, which sells plots through official contracts, sometimes bypassing customary practices entirely.

Livestock farming includes both small and large animals, such as goats, pigs, rabbits, guinea pigs, cattle, sheep, and others.

2020 static data of animals raised in Kalehe Territory:

| Species | Number of heads | Number of farmers |
|---|---|---|
| Cattle | 27,152 | 2,283 |
| Pigs | 28,888 | 1,896 |
| Goats | 363,934 | 16,352 |
| Sheep | 29,662 | 1,564 |
| Rabbits | 9,850 | 32,854 |
| Chickens | 194,361 | 7,689 |
| Ducks | 141,243 | 6,325 |
| Guinea pigs | 93,560 | 5,867 |
| Pigeons | 6,762 | 754 |
| Turkeys | 47,362 | 1,576 |
| Dogs | 9,020 | 5,642 |
| Cats | 7,418 | 645 |
| Horses | 15 | 4 |
| Geese | 31 | 4 |
| Guinea fowls | 123 | 6 |
| Quails | 500 | 1 |

The highland plateaus of Bulanga, Bushaku, Kichwambili, and Tchamula are notable for large livestock farming, which historically provided bride wealth and access to large tracts of cultivable land. The sector, however, has been severely impacted since the First Congo War by theft, looting, and ongoing Kivu conflicts. A lack of veterinary services has led to the death of some remaining livestock.

Livestock species statistics in 1995, 1996, and 1997:

| Species | 1995 | 1996 | 1997 |
|---|---|---|---|
| Goats | 4371 | 2857 | 1920 |
| Sheep | 485 | 262 | 193 |
| Pigs | 297 | 199 | 302 |
| Cattle | 5822 | 1449 | 332 |

Since 1986, farmers have been grouped into a single development organization called Comité de Développement Intégré de Kalehe (CDI-Kalehe), which focuses on promoting women's initiatives, small-scale livestock, agriculture, and reforestation. Afterwards, other organizations emerged, including: Local Development Committee (comité local de développement; CLD), Rural Animation Center (centre d'animation rurale; CAR), AMDA, and GALE.

Non-governmental organizations (NGOs) active in Mbinga-Sud include Aides aux Personnes Démunies (APED), Action pour la paix et la concorde (APC), Action Against Hunger, Action pour le Développement et la Paix endogènes (ADEPAE), International Rescue Committee, and World Vision International.

=== Fishing and mining ===
Fishing is primarily conducted on Lake Kivu. Commonly caught species include tilapia, Limnothrissa, and haplochromis, although fish stocks are insufficient to fully meet the nutritional needs of the local population. Fish production is seasonal, decreasing during the rainy season and increasing during the dry season.

Fishing techniques depend on the equipment used. Line fishing, known locally as luloba, is practiced by lakeside residents, children from the islets, and idle youth. Other techniques include ordinary net fishing (Mulaga), harpoon fishing (Omushambi), trap fishing (chishenge), scoop net fishing (kasaburo), and hand fishing in murky waters (okuzimbira). Some of these traditional techniques are gradually disappearing. Net fishing typically involves teams of three canoes operating at night, using mesh nets illuminated by kerosene lamps. Fishermen are categorized as either artisanal fishermen, who engage in more organized and commercial fishing, or traditional or customary fishermen, who rely on longstanding local practices.

The subsoil of the Democratic Republic of the Congo contains a variety of mineral deposits, some of which remain unexplored. Surveys conducted in Mbinga-Sud have revealed the presence of mineral resources in the area. Most of these quarries were discovered in the 1990s and are managed locally within agricultural zones, including those for cassiterite. In Bushushu, there are two notable quarries, with one at Nyamukubi, 84 km from Bukavu, and another at Lushebere, 87 km from Bukavu. In Nyawaronga, specifically at a site called Ibale, cassiterite and gold are present.

=== Commerce, transport, and communication ===
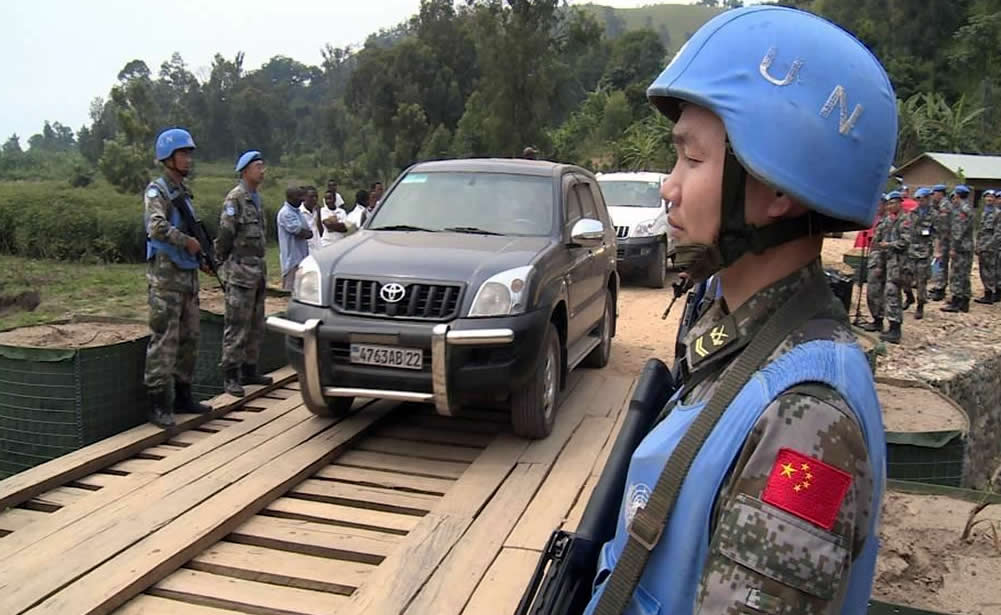
Rehabilitated Luzira Bridge in Kalehe Territory, secured by MONUSCO forces. The bridge was swept away by a landslide in October 2014, which was caused by torrential rains that resulted in significant deaths and property damage.

Mobile trading of agricultural products is the most common form of commerce in the area. Permanent stores are nearly nonexistent, apart from small shops and some local markets such as Buhavu, Kanjuki, Cigera, Bushushu, and Nyamukubi. Products sold in these markets include fish, agro-pastoral produce, and some manufactured goods. Distribution happens through road and lake transport.

Mbinga-Sud's main transportation and communication channels are the lake and road routes. Speedboats, motorized boats, and canoes operate on Lake Kivu, linking Bukavu with Goma, Kalehe Territory, and Rwanda, while road vehicles support trade along the Goma–Bukavu route. Villages and sub-villages are also linked by agricultural roads. Telecommunication and internet services are available through several providers: Airtel Congo RDC, installed in Nyabibwe (100 km from Goma and Bukavu) and Musinga; Orange RDC, installed in Nyabibwe, Kasaka, and Idjwi; Vodacom, installed in Idjwi and Kadjuchu-Katana; and Tigo, installed in Chibandja.

=== Domestic architecture and handicrafts ===
The residents traditionally lived in huts made of straw or thatch. With modernization, villagers began constructing houses from corrugated metal sheets and wooden planks, with some still built from mud. In 2020, Solange Furaha Bahizire of the Institut Supérieur des Techniques de Développement de Kalehe noted that most houses are semi-permanent, small-scale, and made from more durable materials. Walls are often constructed using rammed earth, as many residents lack the financial means to build fully permanent structures.

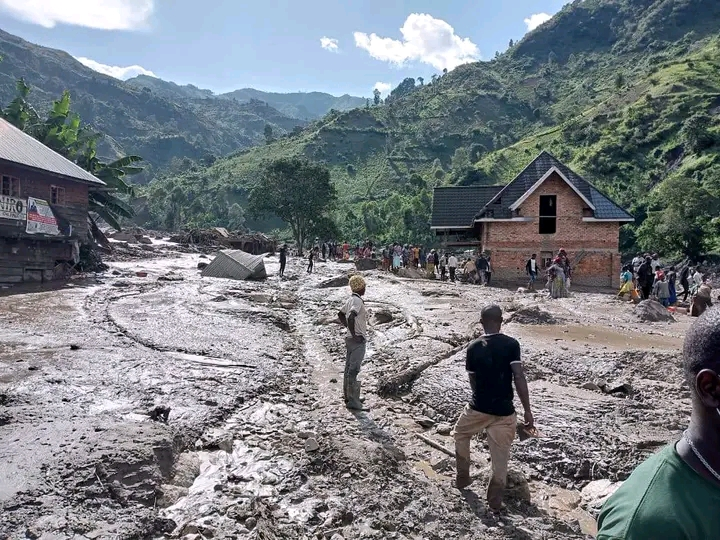
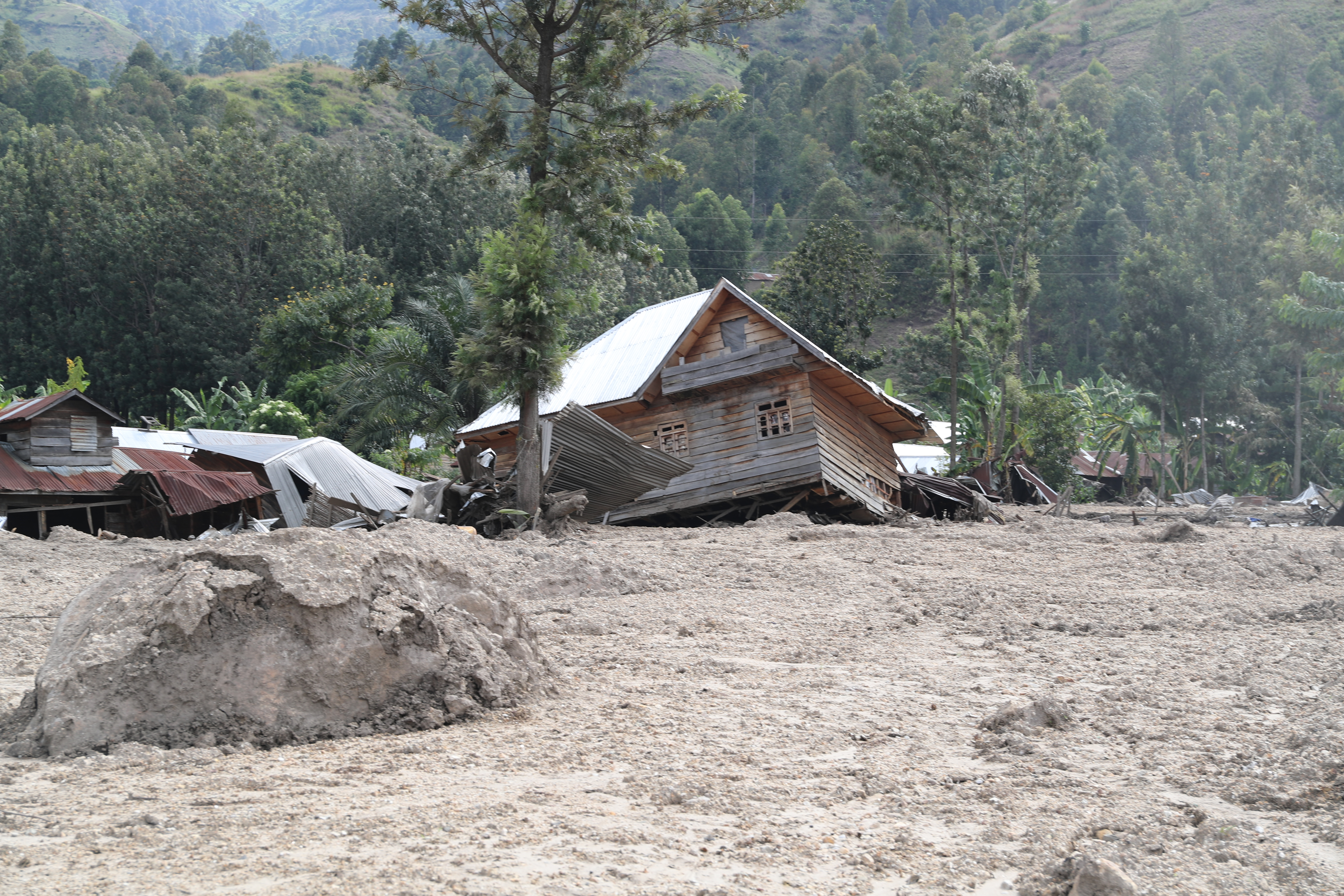
Residential structures in Kalehe Territory affected by landslides

Mbinga-Sud has a tradition of handicrafts that includes brick-making, canoe construction, iron forging, and gate-making. Around the early 2000s, brick-making gained popularity in the groupement, a technique introduced by Hutu and Tutsi communities from Rwanda, which provided the local population with a means of constructing more durable buildings. Brick-making is primarily a seasonal activity, carried out during the dry season, though bricks are sold whenever needed.

By 2016, Mwenyezi Nabudabaga from the Institut Supérieur de Développement Rural de Bukavu (ISDR-Bukavu) noted that canoe construction was declining due to a shortage of suitable trees and a lack of interest or skills among younger generations. Iron forging is also nearly extinct, as most skilled artisans have passed away, and the knowledge has not been passed on to the current generation.
