= Bunyakiri =

Town in Democratic Republic of the Congo

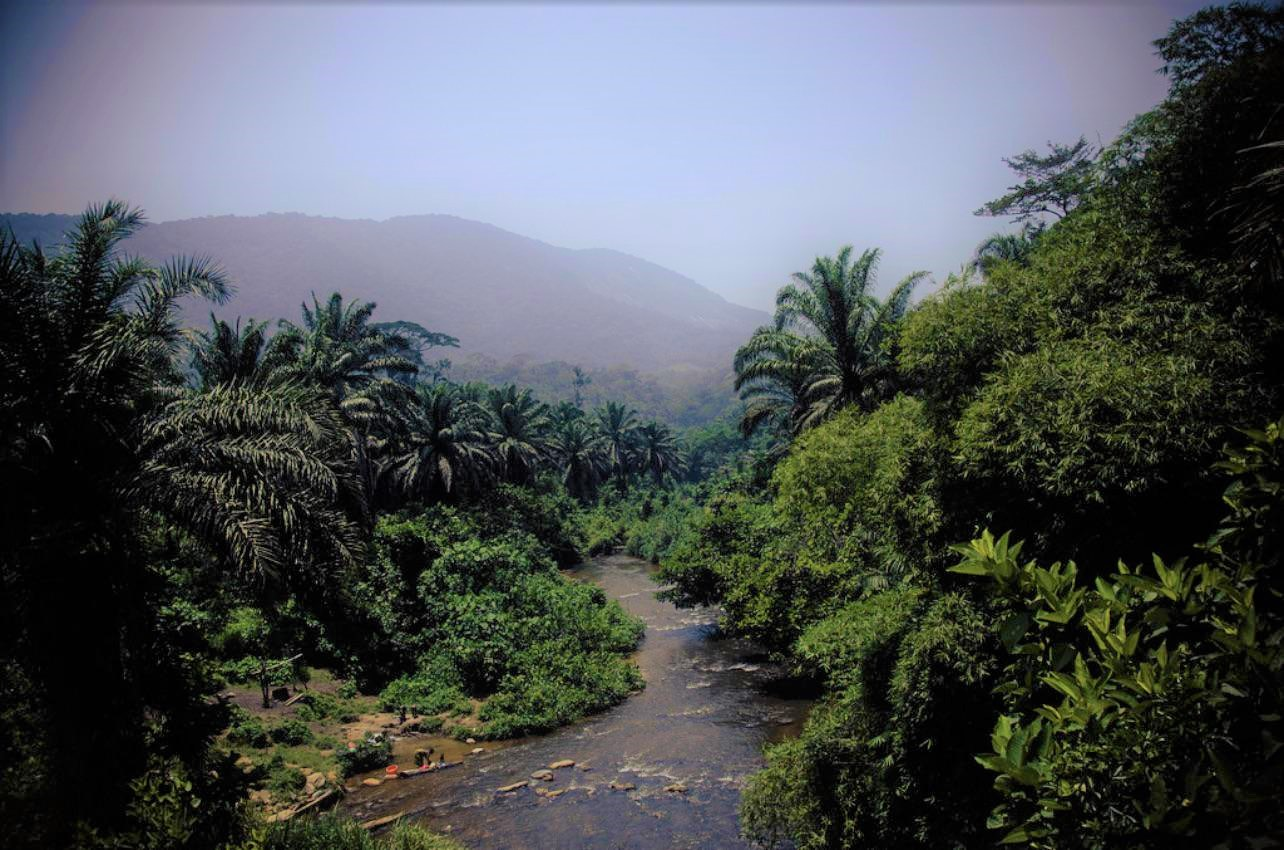
- Nyamirwa River In Bunyakiri, September 2014

- Location within Democratic Republic of the Congo
- Coordinates: 2°5′30″S 28°34′23″E
- Country: Democratic Republic of the Congo
- Province: South Kivu
- Territory: Kalehe
- Time zone: UTC+2 (CAT)

Bunyakiri is a town located in the high plateau of Kalehe Territory in the South Kivu Province in the eastern region of the Democratic Republic of the Congo (DRC). Bunyakiri is nearby the Bulehe and Mulamba villages. It is mainly inhabited by Tembo, Havu (Shi), Twa and Hunde ethnic groups.

The region boasts expansive tracts of fertile land and a favorable climate, making it conducive to agriculture. Local farmers cultivate various crops, including coffee. The region is known for producing high-quality coffee beans. Apart from coffee, other crops grown in the area include maize, beans, potatoes, sweet potatoes, eggplants, bananas, and vegetables.

For over three decades, Bunyakiri has been plagued by persistent violence. Multiple armed groups operate in the region, engaging in illegal mining, extortion, and violence against local communities. By the end of October 2018, the conflict had compelled over 12,000 households of Internally Displaced Persons (IDPs) to abandon their homes, as reported by the World Food Programme.

== History ==
During the persecution of Hutu refugees in the First Congo War by the Alliance of Democratic Forces for the Liberation of Congo-Zaire (AFDL) and the Rwandan Patriotic Army (RPA), Bunyakiri served as a refuge for the Hutu refugees. Additionally, it functioned as a transit point for refugees seeking to move to Walikale Territory. From December 22nd to December 23rd, 1997, AFDL/RPA soldiers brutally killed 22 civilians at the Bulambika commercial center in Bunyakiri.

=== Ongoing conflict (2005–2018) ===
Since the Second Congo War, there has been an ongoing conflict between the FDLR (Democratic Forces for the Liberation of Rwanda) and Raia Mutomboki. The FDLR, composed largely of individuals who were involved in the Rwandan Genocide, has been accused of carrying out various human rights abuses, such as attacks on civilians, illegal mining, and extortion. Raia Mutomboki, on the other hand, is a predominantly Congolese armed group that emerged as a local defense force in response to the FDLR's presence. The conflict between these two groups has resulted in further violence and instability in the region, exacerbating the suffering of local communities.

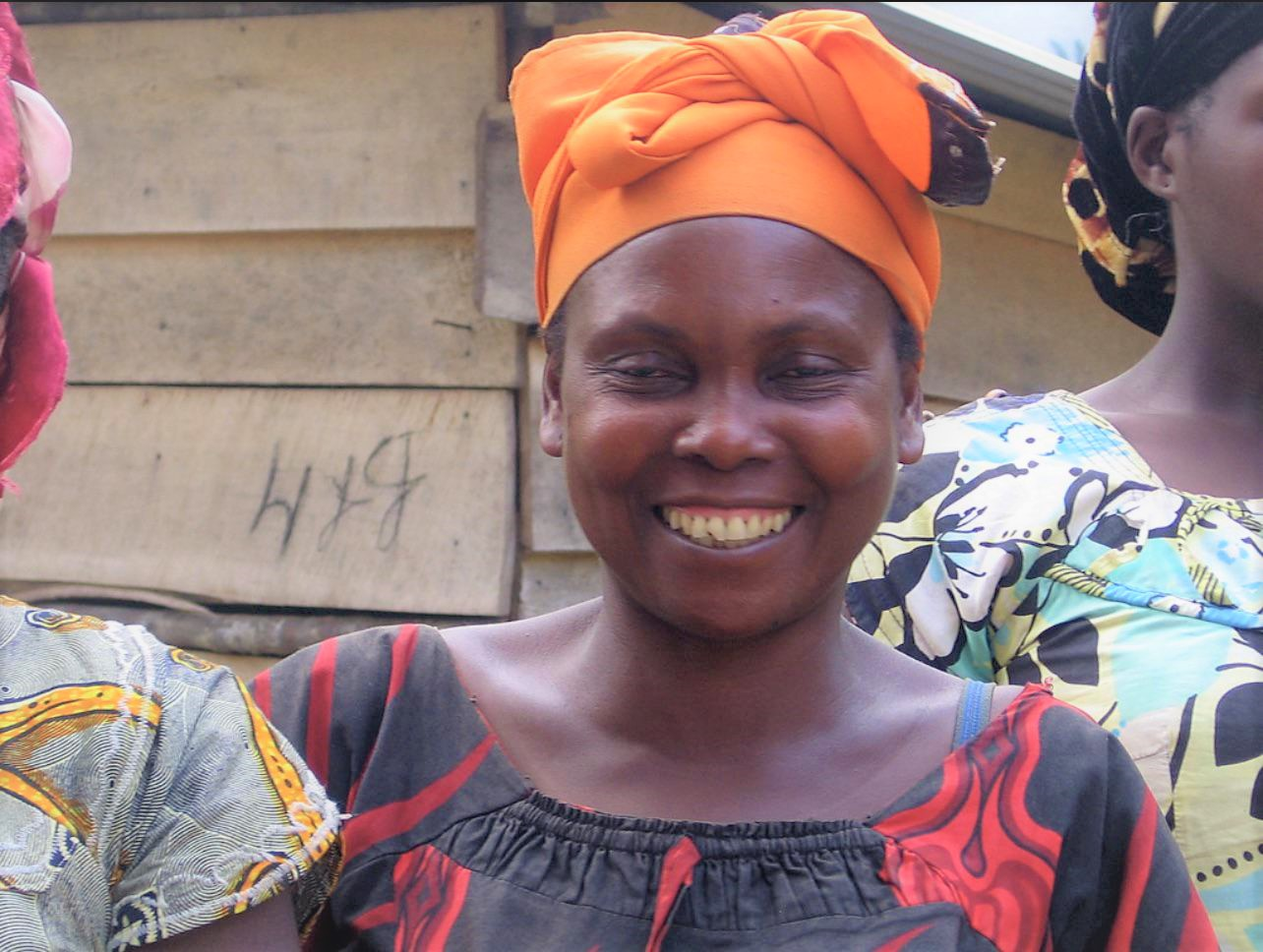
Victims of sexual violence in the town of Bunyakiri, August 2010

In November 2005, the FDLR occupied the villages of Bushi bwa Mbombo, Kiteyala, and Kibiriro in Bunyakiri. Subsequently, the Armed Forces of the Democratic Republic of the Congo (FARDC), operating under the authority of the 10th Military Region, regained control over these three villages. In February 2006, the FARDC launched a counter-offensive against the FDLR rebels in the Kahuzi-Biéga National Park. According to military sources contacted by Radio Okapi, the fighting continued around Manga, near the town of Bunyakiri. Ikingi, which was one of the FDLR bases, came under the control of the FARDC. In March 2006, the FARDC, supported by MONUC, successfully recaptured the villages of Chibiriro and Manga from the FDLR in Bunyakiri.

In March 2008, the FDLR gained control over ten localities in Bunyakiri. Among the localities under FDLR control include Ekingi, Ramba, Manga, Katshiri, and others. By August 2008, 10 FDLR fighters were repatriated to Rwanda. Out of these returnees, 7 from the high plateaus of Uvira, 2 from Bunyakiri, and another who had been detained for several days in the Saio military cell in Bukavu.

In February 2009, 335 FDLR rebels from Bunyakiri, Sange, and Uvira were repatriated to Rwanda. The head of the Disarmament, Demobilization, Repatriation, Resettlement, and Reintegration (DDRRR) of MONUSCO identified 217 Rwandan Hutu combatants and their dependents who are located in various centers. Among them, there were 60 combatants and 157 dependents and civilians. Minister of National Defense Charles Mwando Nsimba announced the commencement of the Kimya II Operation, which aims to track down FDLR rebels in the South Kivu Province.

From May 9th to 10th, 2009, the resurgence of FDLR in Busurungi resulted in 60 casualties and the displacement of a large number of civilians. A multidisciplinary team from MONUSCO uncovered burned huts and charred bodies that had been buried in mass graves. Over 50 injured individuals were evacuated to different health centers and hospitals in the region.

From May 24th to 25th, 2009, the FDLR burned down a hundred houses in various villages of Kalehe Territory. According to eyewitnesses, five people lost their lives, and a few individuals were abducted by the attackers. Over 100 houses were set ablaze by the assailants. Subsequently, on the night of May 25th, another attack took place in Ciriba, lasting until Tuesday, May 26th. Consequently, a large number of people were displaced, with residents fleeing from villages such as Mubugu, Museni, Musunguti, Mulongwe, and Bitale. In July 2009, the High Commission for Refugees office in Bukavu repatriated 255 Rwandan refugees to Rwanda.

On April 12, 2011, a dozen people were abducted by the FDLR in Bunyakiri. According to CENI (National Independent Electoral Commission), the head of the identification center for the revision of the electoral register in Kahunzu, along with his daughter and the identification officer, were among those kidnapped. Furthermore, between April 16 and 17, a FARDC position in Bunyakiri was attacked. According to Okapi, the attack led to the death of two Congolese army personnel and left four civilians injured.

In June 2011, Nindja, one of the two chiefdoms in the Kabare Territory, came under the control of FDLR rebels following the withdrawal of FARDC soldiers for regiment training in the Walungu Territory. The incident resulted in the loss of one life, with four people sustaining injuries and seventeen individuals being kidnapped.

On August 8, 2011, a dozen FDLR fighters were prosecuted for crimes against humanity, including rape, pillaging, murder, possession of weapons of war, and kidnapping. According to Radio Okapi, two fighters, including a commander, appeared in court. Additionally, six other militiamen who had been on the run were tried in the same case. These FDLR combatants were arrested in Bunyakiri in the Kalehe Territory in 2010.

On May 14, 2012, 11 MONUSCO peacekeepers were injured by elements of the Raïa Mutomboki in Kamananga, located 8 km from Bunyakiri. The rebels surreptitiously infiltrated a gathering of protesters who had gathered at the MONUSCO mobile operations base in Kamananga to demonstrate against an attack perpetrated by the FDLR rebels, which killed thirty-two people. Additionally, other protesters erected barricades on the Bunyakiri-Ombo road. According to MONUSCO, some demonstrators discharged firearms at the Blue Helmets. In response, UN forces fired shots into the air to disperse the crowd. The militants assert that they were defending Congolese villages against foreign incursions from the FDLR.

From June 16 to June 19, 2012, Mamadou Ndala, the former commander of the 42nd Battalion, led the FARDC in the South Kivu Province. During this time, the FARDC eliminated 12 Mai-Mai militiamen in the localities of Lusololo, Kirungu, and Kitundu. Two FARDC soldiers were wounded by bullets. Mamadou Ndala reported that his soldiers dispersed the militiamen and subsequently set fire to their strongholds. Incidentally, they also freed a soldier from the 42nd Battalion who had been kidnapped by unknown individuals.

On June 19, 2012, the FARDC captured a Mai-Mai militia leader in Ramba, located 22 km northeast of Bunyakiri in the South Kivu Province. According to local sources, the leader was apprehended while the Mai-Mai rebels were reclaiming positions vacated by the 1003rd Regiment of the FARDC. On the morning of Friday, June 22, 2012, the 902nd FARDC Regiment pursued the Raïa Mutomboki, who had arrived to launch an attack on the Mai-Mai forces in the vicinity of Lumbishi.

In January 2013, over 3,000 FDLR rebels from Kalehe, Bunyakiri, Kashehi, Kitumba-Ninja, and Luyuyu arrived at the Luhago Center in Kabare Territory in the South Kivu Province. They conveyed their aspiration to relinquish their weapons and repatriate to Rwanda.

In July 2014, Désiré Majagi, the president of the civil society of Kalehe Territory, reported the presence of three operational armed groups in the Kalonge groupement: the Raia Mutomboki, the Red Army, and the Mai-Mai Ntakaba. Furthermore, a fourth armed group, known as the Raia Atashinda, operated in the Bunyakiri groupement under the leadership of an "unidentified colonel."

On August 11, 2014, four Raia Mutomboki militiamen were killed, and several others were injured during clashes with the FARDC in Bulambika, Kambegeti, and Kambale villages in Bunyakiri. In the evening, approximately forty Raia Mutomboki attacked the FARDC positions of the 902nd Regiment in Bulambika, Kambageti, and Kambale villages. The head of the Kambale locality was kidnapped by Raia Mutomboki and taken to an unknown destination. Incidentally, the militiamen also took hostage six bodyguards of the commander of the Congolese National Police in Bunyakiri Center. Seven people were found dead in Chifunzi village, Kalehe Territory, including four soldiers, the wife of a soldier, and two children. The clashes caused a significant displacement of the civilian population, with some seeking refuge in the bush and others heading to Bunyakiri Centre.

In March 2018, APC initiated a ceremony to honor demobilized combatants. During the event, twenty Raia Mutomboki combatants voluntarily relinquished their weapons and expressed their willingness to reintegrate into civilian life. The APC's commendable initiative was supported by Swiss cooperation, who provided financial assistance amounting to US$450,000 over a three-year period. The Swiss ambassador to the DRC, the vice-governor of the province of South Kivu, provincial ministers, deputies, and MONUSCO delegates, actively participated in the ceremony, emphasizing the importance of reintegrating ex-combatants into their social environment.

== Hangul teaching ==
The sister of a Twa leader from eastern Democratic Republic of Congo visited Korea in 2015 for a cultural exchange event. She learned that Hangul was used for the Cia-Cia language in Indonesia, and thought it would help her people, who speak the Chitembo language, estimated to be spoken by 500,000 to 700,000 people. Korean linguists developed a version of the alphabet for Chitembo over the next few years, which previously had no writing system. Korean language teachers in Los Angeles, California taught the alphabet to primary school teachers from Bunyakiri. The school teachers, along with Korean missionaries, taught it to people in the region. They found that children could write their names within half an hour, while adults took longer, but reported that hundreds of them have been able to learn the adapted Hangul.
