= Kasheke =

Coordinates: 2°09′06″S 28°51′22″E

- Groupement capital and village
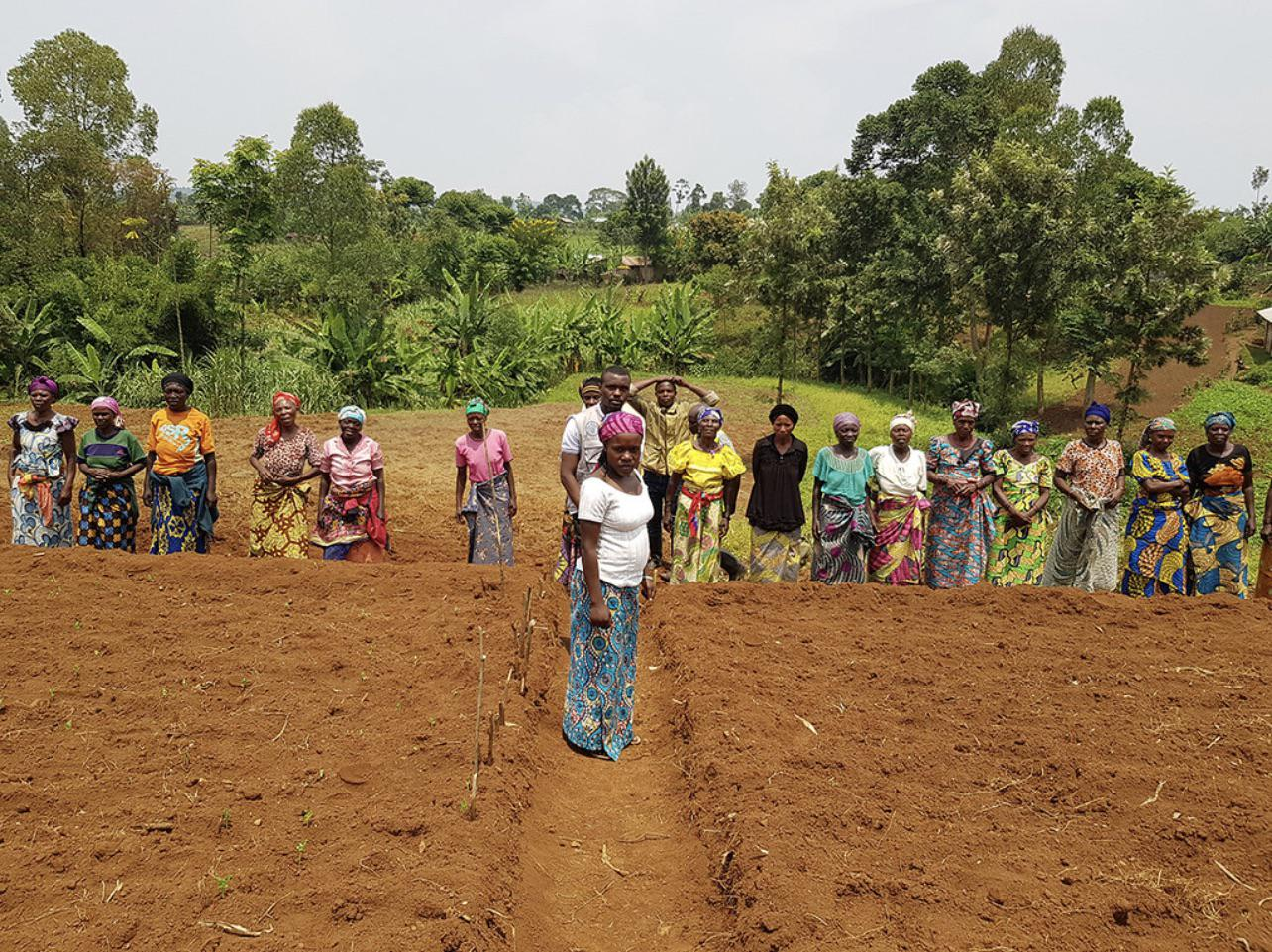
- Kasheke farmer field, March 2023

- Location within Democratic Republic of the Congo
- Country: Democratic Republic of the Congo
- Province: South Kivu
- Territory: Kalehe
- Chiefdom: Buhavu
- Groupement: Mbinga-Sud
- Time zone: UTC+2 (CAT)

Kasheke is a village and capital of Mbinga-Sud groupement of the Buhavu Chiefdom, Kalehe Territory, South Kivu, Democratic Republic of the Congo. Kasheke is 1,475 meters above sea level and is close to Bulengo, Kamabale, Tchofi, and Kabamba villages. The village is mainly occupied by Bahavu clan of the Bashi people, Batwa, Batembo, Barega, Bafuliiru, Babembe, Bahunde, Bakusu, Bangala, Banyarwanda, and Barundi.

Known for its cultivation of maize, cassava, banana, and rice, agriculture serves as the primary regional economy. Despite its agricultural potential, there is currently no agro-industry, although preliminary foundations exist, particularly in coffee and palm oil.

== History ==
Kasheke has long been the ancestral home to a harmonious blend of diverse Bantu ethnic groups. The region was conventionally inhabited by Havu clan of the Shi people.

=== Security and geological problems ===
On 28 May 2011, several houses were looted and several taken hostage in the forest as a result of an attack by alleged elements of the FDLR in Kasheke. On 5 March 2012, at around 10 p.m. local time, FDLR rebels entered Kasheke from Kahuzi-Biéga National Park, abducting seven people, of which four were women and three boys, and seizing nearly all of the village's belongings.

In August 2015, a powerful earthquake measuring at least 5.6 on the scale caused the deaths of a police officer at Katana State Post, over 35 kilometers north of Bukavu, and a woman in Kasheke who was killed when her home collapsed. In September 2019, a FARDC soldier broke into a family's home and killed a mother and two of her children, as well as injuring the father and another son, before fleeing the scene.
