= Cifunzi =

Village in Democratic Republic of the Congo

Cifunzi, also known as Lushenyi, is a populated place in the Kalehe Territory, South Kivu, Democratic Republic of the Congo.

The town was looted by the Democratic Forces for the Liberation of Rwanda (FDLR) in 2009. In retaliation, the Armed Forces of the Democratic Republic of the Congo (FARC) killed a FDLR fighter.

On August 3, 2014, 8 people were killed in a fight between the FDLR and the FARC. As a result, Médecins Sans Frontières discontinued their measles vaccination campaign in the town.
