= Nyambasha =

Village located in the Kalehe Territory

Coordinates: 2°07′48″S 28°52′12″E

Nyambasha is a village located in Kalehe Territory, in the vicinity of Lake Kivu in the South Kivu province in the eastern region of the Democratic Republic of the Congo.

The village is inhabited by the Havu clan of the Bashi people. However, the region has several other ethnic groups, including the Batembo and Barega. There is also a small number of Hutu and Tutsi people.

Nyambasha benefits from favorable climatic conditions and fertile land, which makes it an ideal region for agricultural pursuits. Staple food crops include maize, beans, cassava, sweet potato, yams and potatoes. Farmers also grow a variety of fruits, vegetables, and cash crops. Raising livestock such as cattle, goats, and poultry is another major economic activity.

== 2014 torrential rainfall ==
On 25 October 2014, Nyambasha and other nearby villages, including Bushushu, Rambira, and Nyamukubi, experienced torrential rains that deluged homes and devastated crops. Among the affected areas, Bushushu village was particularly devastated, with over 40 houses collapsing, including the Community of Christ in Congo (CCC) church, where 100 choir members were gathered. According to the World Food Programme, the disaster claimed nearly 400 deaths, destroyed 3,000 houses, and left 200 people missing.
