= Kalehe Territory =

Territory in South Kivu, DR Congo

Kalehe Wilaya ya Kalehe (Swahili)
- Territory
- Territoire de Kalehe
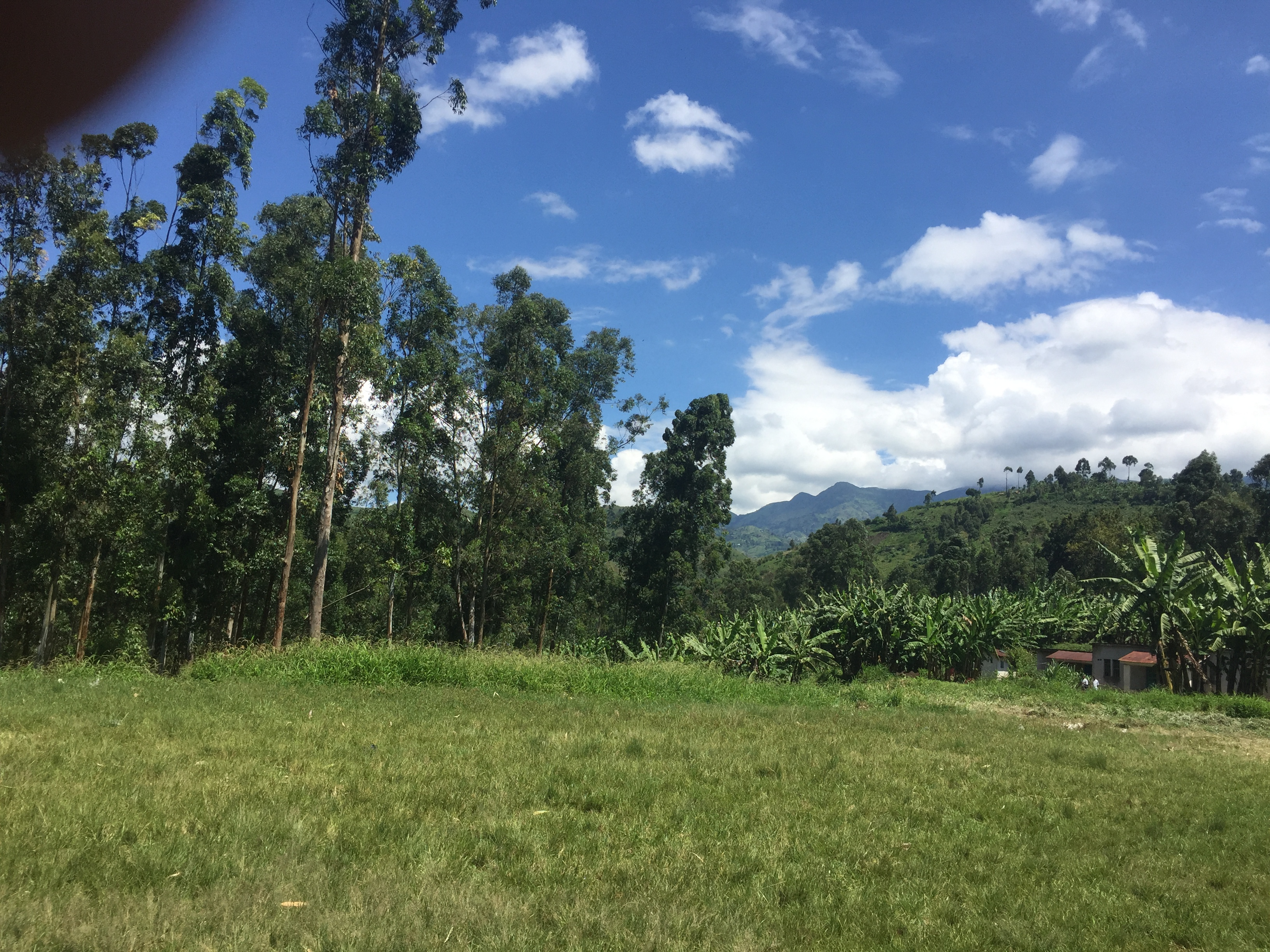
- Minova, Kalehe Territory
- Interactive map of Kalehe
- Location within Democratic Republic of the Congo
- Coordinates: 02°06′15″S 28°27′30″E
- Country: DR Congo
- Province: South Kivu
- Seat: Kalehe

Area
  - Total: 5,057 km^{2} (1,953 sq mi)

Population (2016 est.)
  - Total: 933,181
  - Density: 184.5/km^{2} (477.9/sq mi)
- Time zone: UTC+2 (CAT)
- Official language: French
- National language: Swahili

Kalehe Territory is a territory in South Kivu, Democratic Republic of the Congo. Covering an area of 5,057 square kilometers, it is located northwest and northeast of the provincial capital, Bukavu, and has a population of 933,181 as of 2022. The territory is bordered by Idjwi Territory and Lake Kivu to the east, Shabunda Territory and the Irhambi-Katana groupement of Kabare Territory to the west, Mbinga-Nord groupement, Goma and Masisi Territory to the north, and Kabare Territory, and Maniema Province to the south.

Administratively, Kalehe Territory is divided into two chiefdoms: Buhavu and Buloho. Buhavu Chiefdom, situated along the shores of Lake Kivu, consists of seven groupements and is the most populous, primarily inhabited by the Havu people, along with the Tembo, Rongeronge, Banyarwanda communities. Buloho Chiefdom, traversed by National Road No. 3 linking Bukavu and Kisangani and passing through Kahuzi-Biéga National Park, comprises eight groupements and has a similar ethnic composition, with the Baloho clan of the Bashi people being the dominant ethnic group.

== Geography ==
=== Location ===
Kalehe Territory is located in the northern region of South Kivu Province, in the eastern Democratic Republic of the Congo, with its topography dominated by the Mitumba Mountains in the east. Positioned northwest and northeast of Bukavu, it is part of the "Mountainous Kivu" region, where the Mitumba Mountains form a natural divide between the lowlands of the East African Rift Valley. This area constitutes the middle section of the Great East African Rift, extending 1,400 km in length with an average width of 40 km. The rift valley is divided into three major zones, dominated by Lake Tanganyika in the south, Lake Kivu in the center, and Lake Edward in the north. Kalehe Territory is among the territories linked to the Lake Kivu basin, along with Masisi, Nyiragongo, Idjwi, Kabare, Walungu, Uvira, and Fizi territories. These areas are characterized by high-altitude landscapes ranging from 1,500 to 2,200 meters.

The territory shares its northern border with the city of Goma (through the Katiruzi Strait) and Masisi Territory, separated by the Chungiri River. To the south, it borders Kabare Territory along the Nyawarongo River. Its eastern boundary is defined by Lake Kivu, which extends for more than 86 km from north to south, forming a significant tectonic fault. To the west, it borders Shabunda Territory, as well as parts of Idjwi Territory and Irhambi-Katana groupement of Kabare Territory. The eastern sector of Kahuzi-Biéga National Park, a UNESCO World Heritage Site, is partially located within Kalehe Territory and extends along its borders with Shabunda and Kabare.

=== Climate ===
Kalehe Territory experiences a mountainous climate, with altitudes ranging from 1,300 to 2,000 meters. It has two distinct seasons: a long bimodal rainy season lasting nine months (September to May) and a short dry season of three months (June to August). Annual temperatures range between 18 °C and 22 °C, while precipitation varies from 1,300 to 1,680 mm per year. The highest peak in the territory is Mount Kahuzi, located in Buloho Chiefdom, rising to an altitude of 3,308 meters.

=== Geology, vegetation and hydrology ===
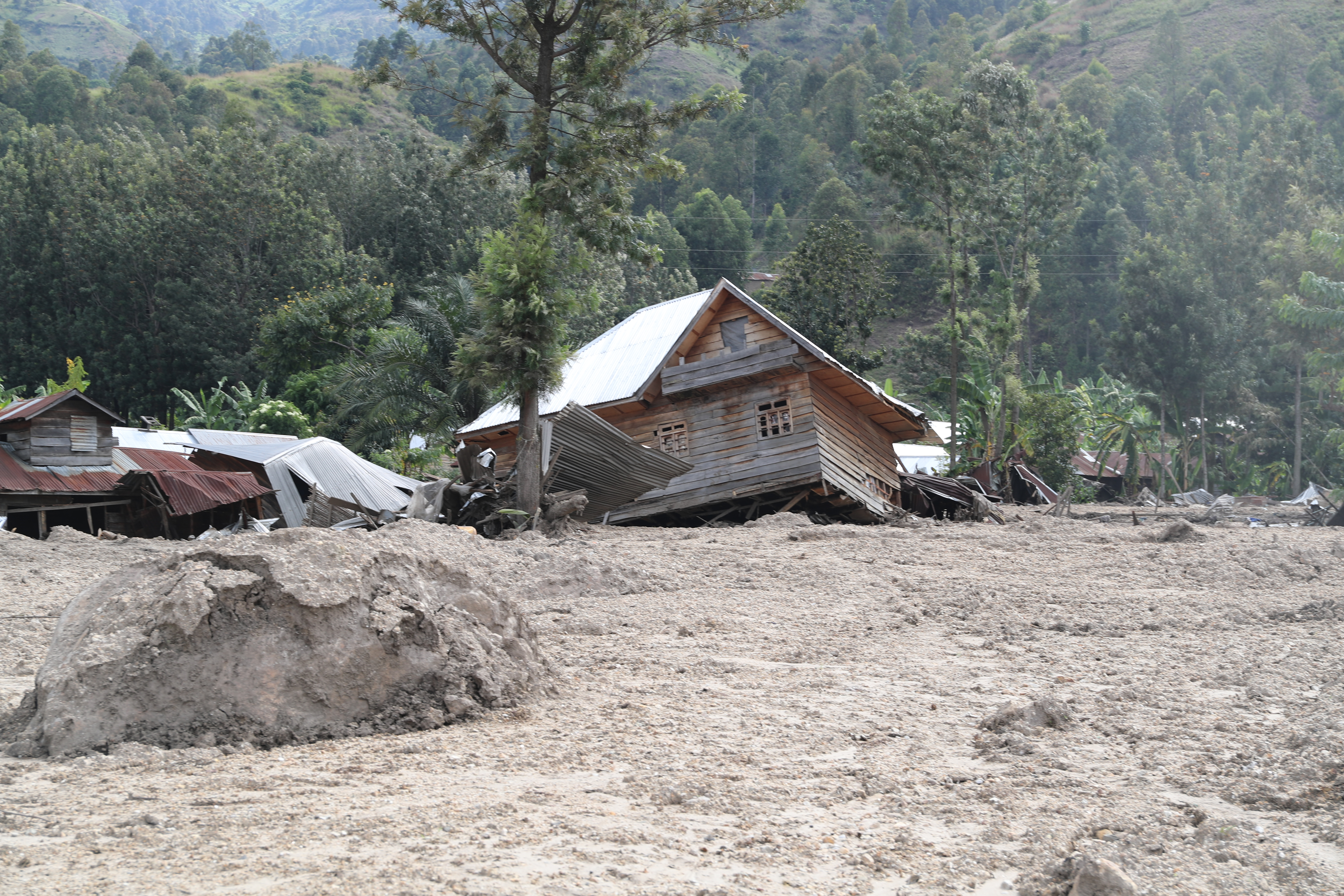
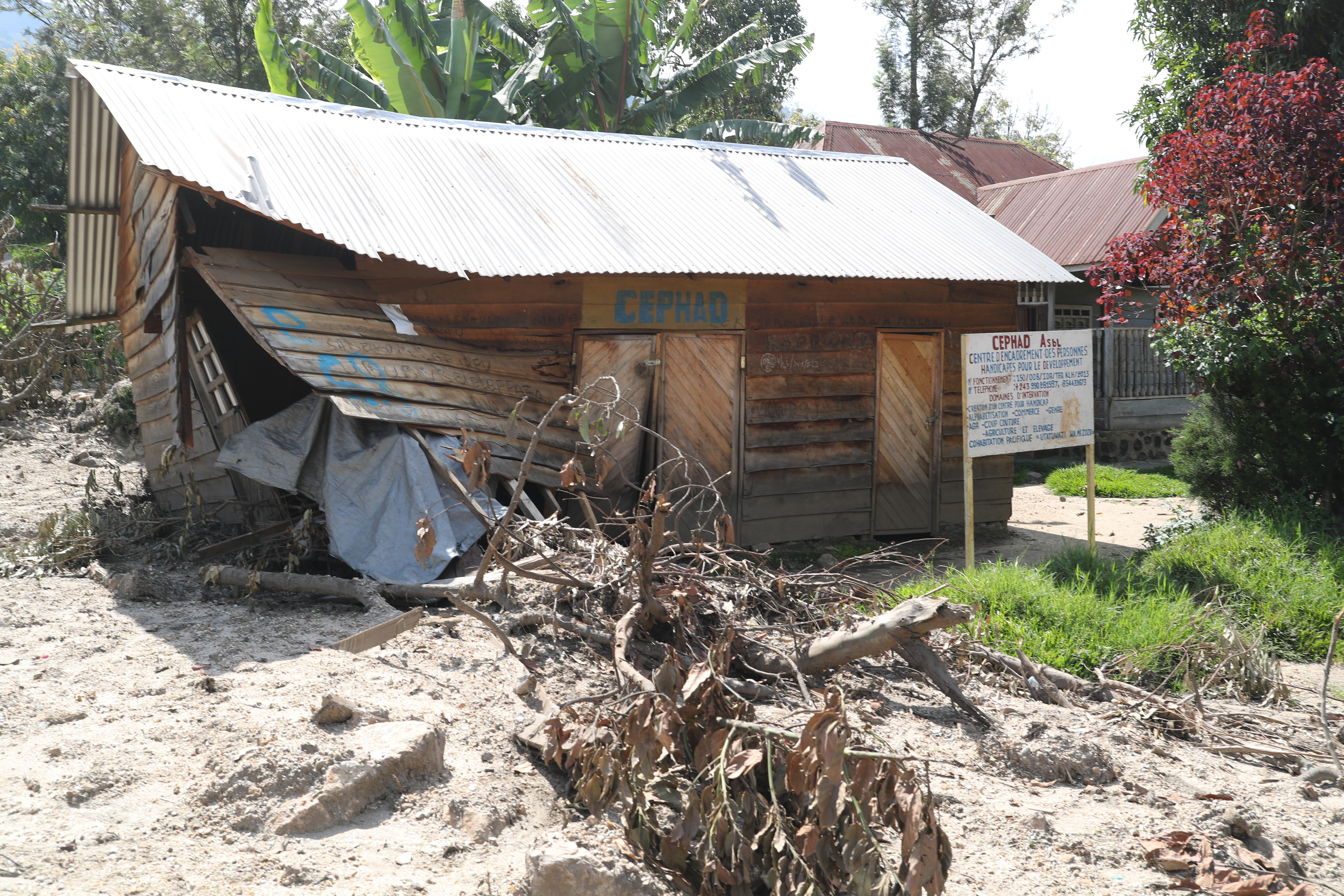
The May 2023 floods and landslides in Kalehe Territory killed more than 400 people.

The soil is predominantly clayey and highly fertile, making it suitable for agriculture and livestock farming. The subsoil of Kalehe is rich in mineral resources, including gold, cassiterite, coltan, tungsten, quartz, muscovite, copper, and tourmaline.

The territory also experiences deep chemical weathering, which contributes to its high susceptibility to erosion and mass wasting. These include hypodermic water circulation (inferoflux), landslides, solifluxion, and terrain slippage. Watersheds such as Nyabarongo, Nyamukubi, and Ndindi exhibit clear signs of regressive erosion, a process that leads to the backward retreat of slopes, particularly in regions with torrential streams. The combination of intense vertical land dissection and steep mountain topography has carved out canyon-like valleys that eventually transform into broad, trough-shaped valleys with low downstream hydraulic gradients (less than 3°). These serve as sediment traps where materials transported from upstream settle, creating a rugged lakeshore landscape with exposed, partially weathered rocks.

The extent of weathering has also given rise to distinct sedimentary formations:

- Sandy zones from the breakdown of metamorphic rocks,
- Clay-rich wetlands formed from the alteration of magmatic rocks.

These diverse zones support a range of ecosystems, including fish nurseries, marshlands, and beaches along Lake Kivu.

Fluvial, rainfall-induced, and surface runoff erosion have collectively rounded rocky ridges and given rise to the convex hill formations that typify Kalehe Territory's landscape. Kalehe Territory is particularly prone to erosion, a characteristic typical of equatorial highland regions. Rampant deforestation and inadequate land-use planning continue to exacerbate the situation, resulting in frequent landslides and severe flooding.

The vegetation is primarily composed of forests, including bamboo and shrubs, though deforestation due to agriculture, charcoal production, firewood collection, timber harvesting, and mining activities has led to significant environmental degradation. Scattered afforestation efforts exist across the territory.

Kalehe Territory is also rich in water resources, with 12 main rivers, in addition to Lake Kivu. The major rivers in the territory include Luhoho, Tchiganda, Mwabo, Nyamunene, Nyawaronga, Ndindi, Nyamasasa, Lwama, Eke, Kahoho, Luhaha, and Lua.

=== Administrative division ===
==== Historical background ====
Kalehe Territory was officially established through General Administration Ordinance No. 10, which implemented the Decree of 28 March 1912 concerning the territorial organization of the Kivu District. Over time, its boundaries were modified by subsequent ordinances, including No. 91/AIMO of 23 April 1933, No. 70/AIMO of 25 March 1945, and Ordinance No. 21/423 of December 1950. The most significant territorial change occurred following Ordinance No. 68/18 of 12 January 1968, which led to the creation of Idjwi Territory in 1974.

==== Chiefdoms and governance ====
The territory is structured into two chiefdoms, Buhavu and Buloho, each led by a customary chief, commonly referred to as the "mwami". The mwami, a direct descendant of the region's traditional rulers, is assisted by an Administrative Secretary and an Accounting Receiver, along with other sectoral service officials. Each chiefdom is subdivided into groupements (groupings), which are administered by groupement chiefs (chefs de groupement). These groupements are further divided into villages (localités), each under the leadership of a village chief. Although the mwami is chosen from the royal family in accordance with customary traditions, he remains subordinate to the territorial administrator, who holds the official hierarchical authority.

Buhavu Chiefdom consists of seven groupements:

- Buzi
- Kalonge
- Kalima
- Mbinga-Nord
- Mbinga-Sud
- Mubungu
- Ziralo

Buloho Chiefdom includes eight groupements:

- Bitale
- Musenyi
- Ndando
- Mulonge
- Lubengera
- Munyandjiro
- Bagana
- Karali

== Security problems ==
=== Interethnic and territorial disputes ===
The territory is composed of two chiefdoms: Buhavu and Buloho, whose boundaries and authority have historically been contested. The Buhavu Chiefdom, which consists of seven groupements, is predominantly inhabited by the Bahavu people, who occupy Buzi, Mbinga-Nord, and Mbinga-Sud. The Batembo control Kalima, Mubuku, and Ziralo, while the Barongeronge reside in Kalonge. Disputes over land ownership and administrative authority have led to tensions between these groups.

A key source of conflict is the demand for autonomy by the Batembo and Barongeronge, who seek administrative independence from the Bahavu. The Batembo, in particular, have sought to reestablish their cultural and political unity, which was fragmented by colonial-era territorial divisions since 1945. However, this aspiration is strongly opposed by the Bahavu, who fear the loss of territory, resources, and economic influence.

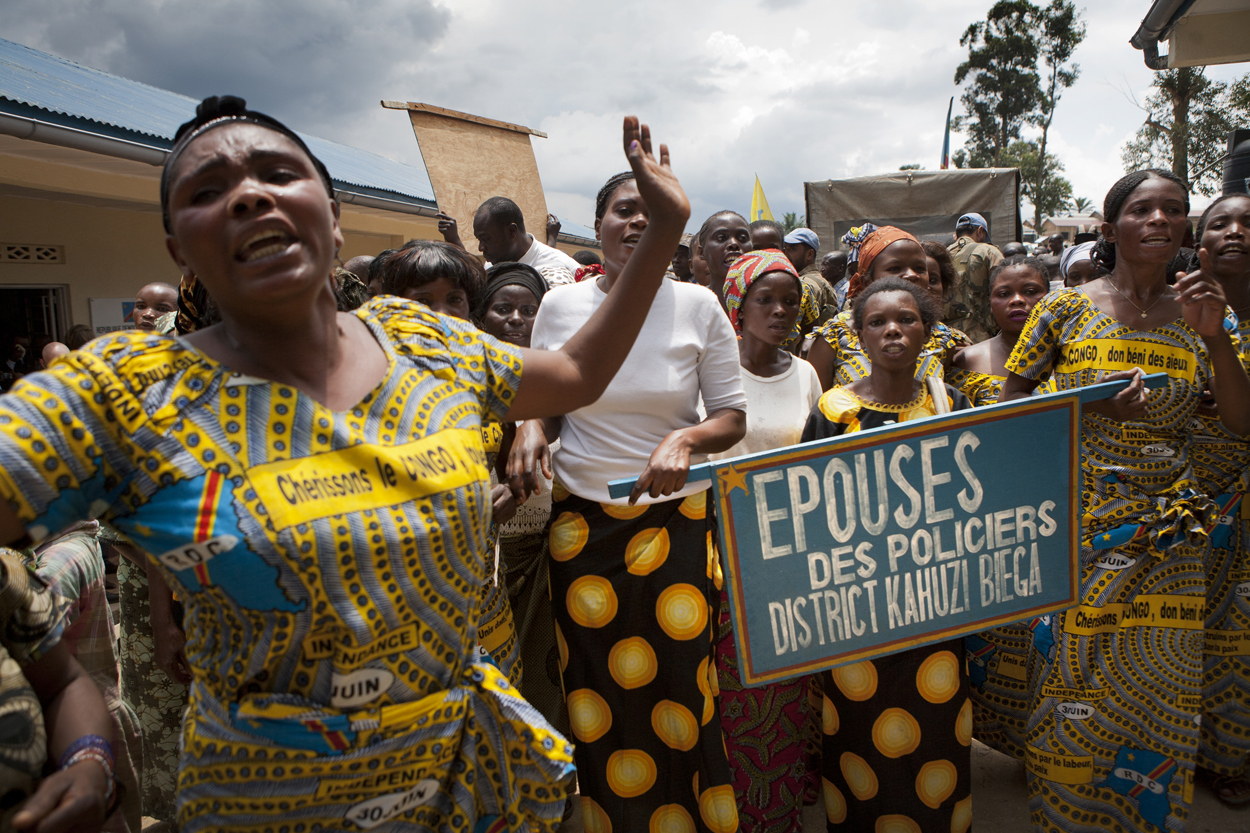
Women of Kalehe Territory marching with a sign that reads, "Wives of the police officers of the Kahuzi-Biega district".

The conflict between the Batembo and Bahavu escalated in 1999 with the occupation of the region by Rwanda and Uganda-backed rebel group Congolese Rally for Democracy (RCD), which was staunchly opposed to the central government in Kinshasa. Under RCD authority, the administrative restructuring of Kalehe Territory culminated in the provisional designation of Bunyakiri as an independent territorial entity, an action that was formally instituted through a departmental decree on 22 July 2002. Its internal subdivisions and boundaries with neighboring territories were defined by decrees dated 7 August and 28 September 2002. This reorganization resulted in the Bahavu losing significant territorial influence and access to mining sites. Beyond the indigenous interethnic rivalries, the Bahavu, Batembo, and Banyarwanda, comprising Batutsi and Bahutu, remain embroiled in long-standing disputes, particularly in the middle and high plateaus of Kalehe Territory. These disputes primarily center on nationality and land ownership. The Bahavu and Batembo have historically regarded the Banyarwanda as foreigners, arguing that their presence in the region dates back only to the migratory waves of 1959, thus denying them land rights and political representation. Banyarwanda presence in the territory dates back to colonial migration policies. In the 1950s, Hutu migrants arrived as part of Belgian efforts to provide labor for plantations in the then-Belgian Congo. Some of these migrants had initially settled in Masisi Territory, North Kivu, before relocating to Kalehe Territory. Customary Bahavu and Batembo chiefs granted them access to unoccupied land in the highlands (Hauts Plateaux). Subsequently, from 1959 onwards, political upheavals in Rwanda led to an influx of Tutsi refugees, who also settled in the territory and acquired land.

Over time, these migration patterns reshaped the territory's social structure, intensifying competition over land and resources. Disputes emerged between migrant Banyarwanda and indigenous communities as well as between Tutsi pastoralists, who required extensive grazing land, and Hutu agriculturalists, who prioritized farmland. During the early 1990s democratization process, Kalehe's land conflicts became increasingly politicized, with identity politics fueling tensions. The citizenship status of Congolese Tutsi became a highly contested issue, with various armed groups in eastern Congo mobilizing around the question of Rwandophone identity. These disputes escalated amid broader ethnic struggles in the region. The Banyarwanda, on the other hand, assert their Congolese identity, emphasizing that they have severed ties with Rwanda and are recognized under the Congolese Constitution of 18 February 2006. They demand administrative recognition, including the establishment of a chiefdom that reflects their presence and customary authority. These demands were reinforced during the RCD's control of the region when the movement established the Buzi highlands as a Banyarwanda-administered chiefdom, which further deepened the ethnic cleavages and hostility among local communities.

=== Regional conflicts and wars ===
==== First Congo War ====
The region has been a theater of conflict, particularly during the First Congo War, when it became a refuge for various armed groups and a battleground for multiple factions. Following the Rwandan genocide in 1994, hundreds of thousands of Rwandan and Burundian Hutu refugees fled into South Kivu. Among them were civilians of all ages who feared reprisals from the RPF or Tutsi civilians, but also leaders of the genocidal organization: former soldiers of the Rwandan Armed Forces (Forces Armées Rwandaises; FAR), gendarmes and Interahamwe militiamen. In response, the Rwandan Patriotic Army (RPA) carried out military operations inside Zaire (now the Democratic Republic of the Congo) to neutralize these forces, who justified their actions by accusing the Zairean government under Mobutu Sese Seko of harboring the perpetrators of the Rwandan genocide. However, reports from the United Nations Security Council and other sources suggest that these interventions also involved systematic looting of Zaire's mineral wealth and large-scale massacres.

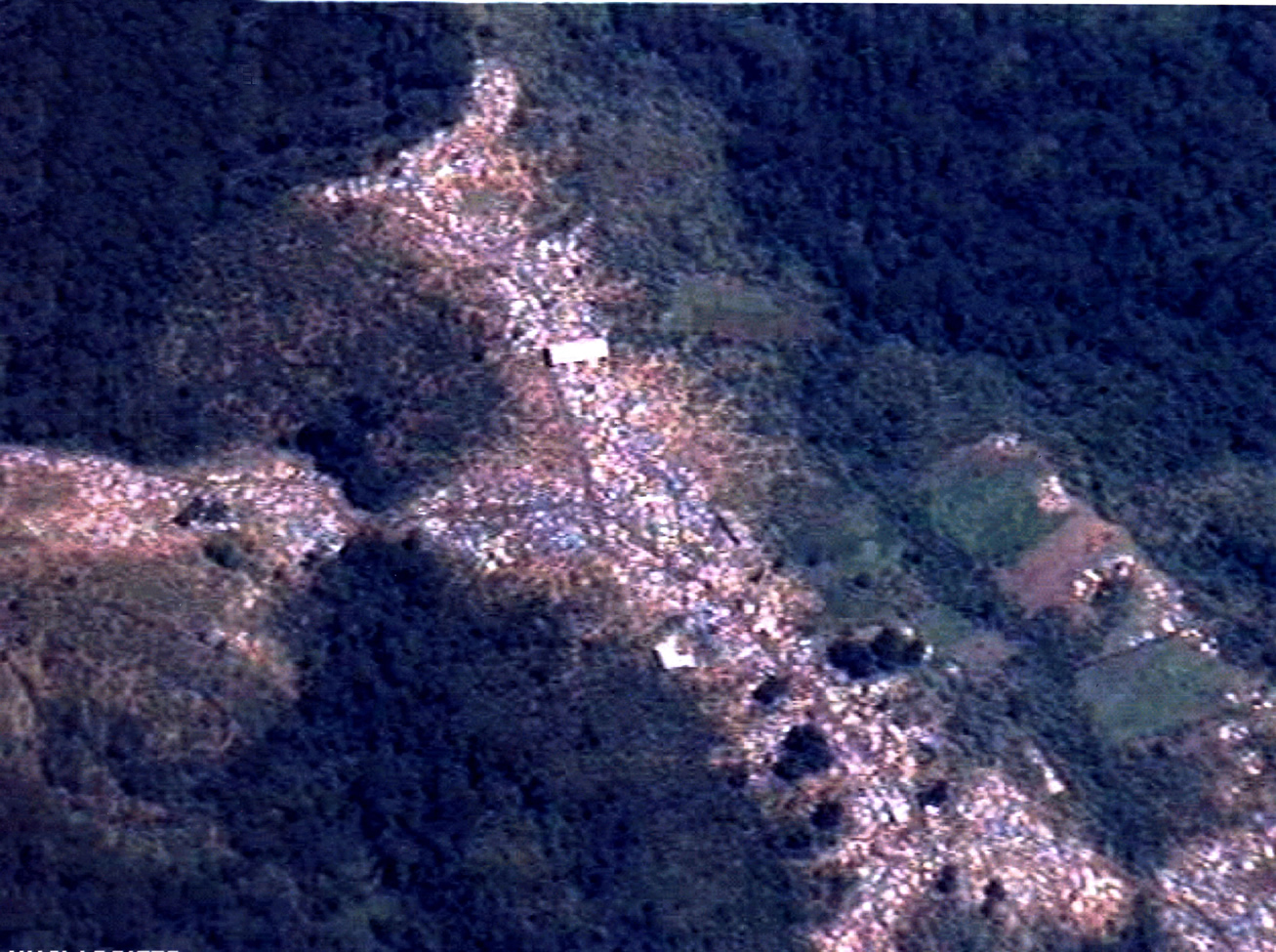
Aerial photograph of a Mihanda, Zaire refugee camp in 1996. Pictured are 500+ tents set up in the Mitumba Mountains.

On 11 April 1995, an attack by around fifty RPA soldiers targeted the Birava refugee camp in Kabare Territory, resulting in the deaths of approximately thirty people and injuries to many others. Similar incidents occurred in April 1996, when Banyamulenge-Tutsi armed units reportedly attacked the Runingu refugee camp in Uvira Territory, killing between eight and ten refugees. The violence escalated after the AFDL-RPA forces captured Bukavu and destroyed refugee camps north of the city. Survivors fled toward North Kivu, with many passing through Kahuzi-Biéga National Park or Nyabibwe. Those who traveled via Nyabibwe were intercepted and massacred by ex-RPA/Interahamwe units in mid-November 1996. The victims, including the sick, elderly, and physically disabled, were killed with rockets or burned alive inside vehicles. Pursued by AFDL-RPA troops, many refugees perished in makeshift camps such as Shanje and Numbi in Kalehe Territory. Two major massacres occurred on 21–22 November 1996. In Shanje and the Rukiga bamboo forest, AFDL-RPA forces killed several hundred refugees, many of whom were shot or struck by shrapnel. Survivors, including children and elderly people, were later executed along the roadside. The following day, a similar attack occurred in Lumbishi, targeting those who had fled from Shanje. Additional killings took place in Kahuzi-Biéga National Park around 2–4 November, as AFDL-RPA forces pursued and killed an unknown number of refugees.

==== Second Congo War and rise of the new armed groups ====
Following the dismantling of the refugee camps, the ex-FAR and Interahamwe reorganized into the Army for the Liberation of Rwanda (ALIR), which later forged an alliance with the forces of Laurent-Désiré Kabila and the indigenous Mai-Mai local defense militias in concerted opposition to the Rwandan and Ugandan-backed Rassemblement Congolais pour la Démocratie (RCD) insurgency during the protracted Second Congo War (1998–2003). In Kalehe Territory, ALIR and, later, the Democratic Forces for the Liberation of Rwanda (FDLR) coexisted and fought alongside the Mai-Mai faction led by General Padiri, occupying vast forested and rural areas, while the RCD maintained control over urban centers. With the signing of peace agreements in 2003 and the establishment of a transitional government that included various belligerents, the FDLR remained active in the region. As the Mai-Mai forces integrated into the national army, the FDLR filled the power vacuum left behind. Although they no longer "constitute a real threat to the power in place in Kigali", they continue to oppose the Kigali government, denouncing it as a "bloody dictatorship" and demanding an inter-Rwandan political dialogue that would grant them political and military representation in Rwanda.

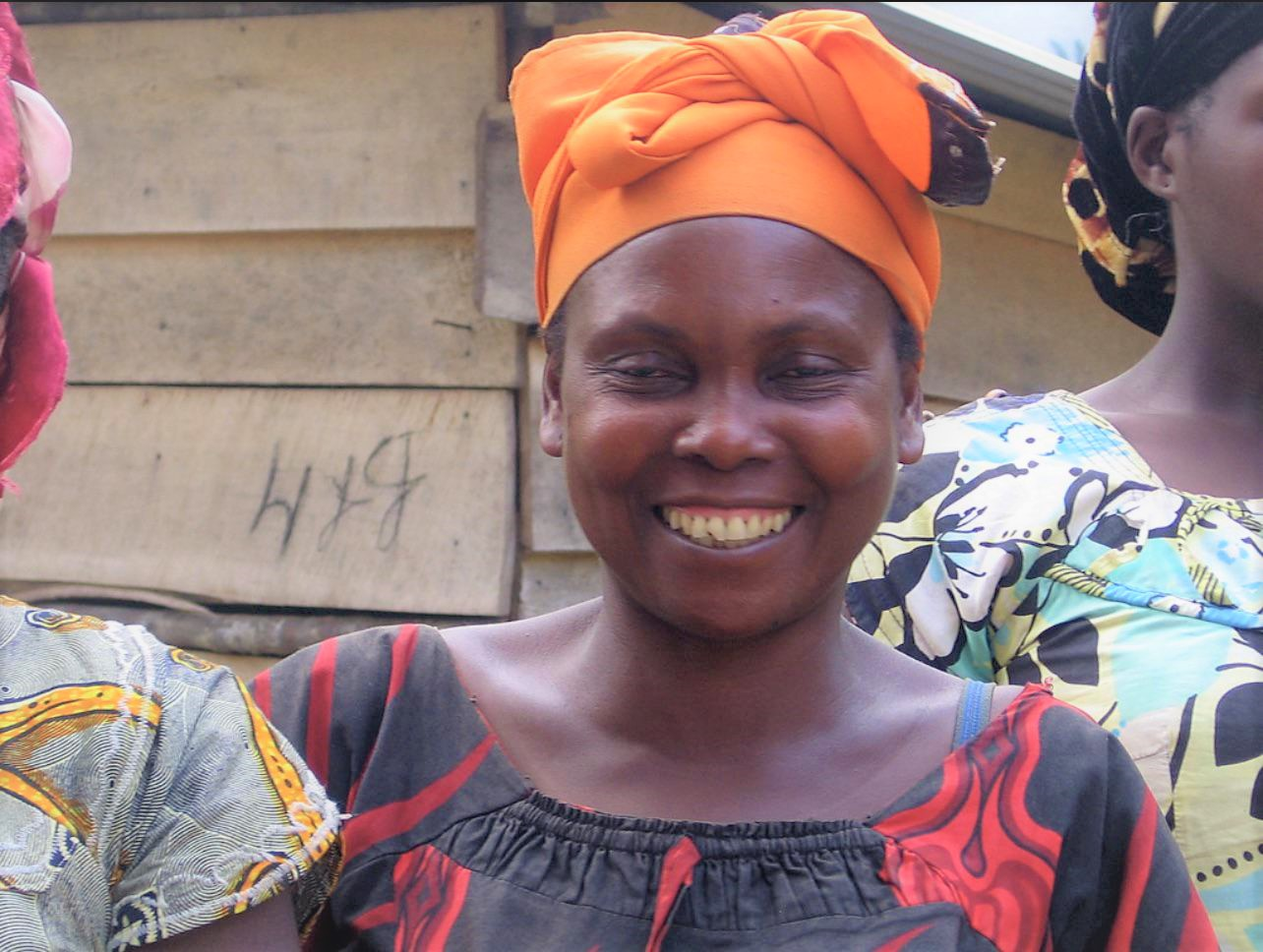
Victims of sexual violence in the town Bunyakiri in the Kalehe Territory

In March 2007, a new armed group, the Patriotes Résistants Congolais (PARECO), emerged in Masisi Territory, comprising Hutu, Tembo, Hunde, and Nande combatants from Masisi, Rutshuru, and Walikale territories. PARECO quickly became one of the most influential self-defense groups in Kivu and was the first major Congolese militia to establish a presence in Kalehe Territory. Initially settling in Ziralo groupement villages like Lumbishi, Shandje, and Chambombo in September 2007, the group expanded to control the high plateaus of Kalehe by 2008. PARECO's primary objective was to combat Laurent Nkunda's CNDP forces, often receiving support from certain elements within the Armed Forces of the Democratic Republic of the Congo (FARDC). PARECO was divided into two main divisions: one in North Kivu and another in South Kivu. The South Kivu division had two battalions: one led by Colonel Matthieu Wegamiye Nzalihande, a former FARDC captain, who controlled the southern Kalehe highlands (Bushaku, Nyamugari, and Nyawaronga), and the other under Colonel Gwigwi Busogi, who managed the northern sector (Shandje, Lumbishi, Ramba, and Chambombo). In Kalehe, PARECO was composed primarily of Rwandophone Hutus, which led to its perception as a militia defending Hutu interests.

Another prominent armed group, the Mai-Mai Kirikicho, emerged primarily among the Batembo communities of Ziralo and Ufamandu in Walikale Territory. The militia was founded by Kirikicho, a former Mai-Mai captain under General Padiri, who rejected his assigned rank of major during the 2003 military integration process. Instead, Kirikicho and his loyal fighters retreated to the forests of Ziralo, organizing and recruiting new members. By 2006, his militia had gained recognition from local development organizations and the 10th Military Region of the FARDC. Although Kirikicho initially agreed to integrate into the army in mid-2007, he later withdrew, citing unfulfilled demands, including security guarantees for Ziralo's civilian population, salary payments for his fighters, and a promotion to a higher military rank. His group continued to operate in the forests of Ufamandu and Ziralo, with its headquarters in Biriko until January 2009. Presently, Kirikicho's forces remain operational within Kalehe Territory.

Beyond these major groups, ongoing conflicts in South Kivu have facilitated the rise of several smaller militias, including Audacieux, Ngumino, Twirwaneho, Batiri, and Bakobwa. The Rwanda-backed M23 rebel movement re-emerged in January 2025.

== Economy ==
=== Agriculture ===
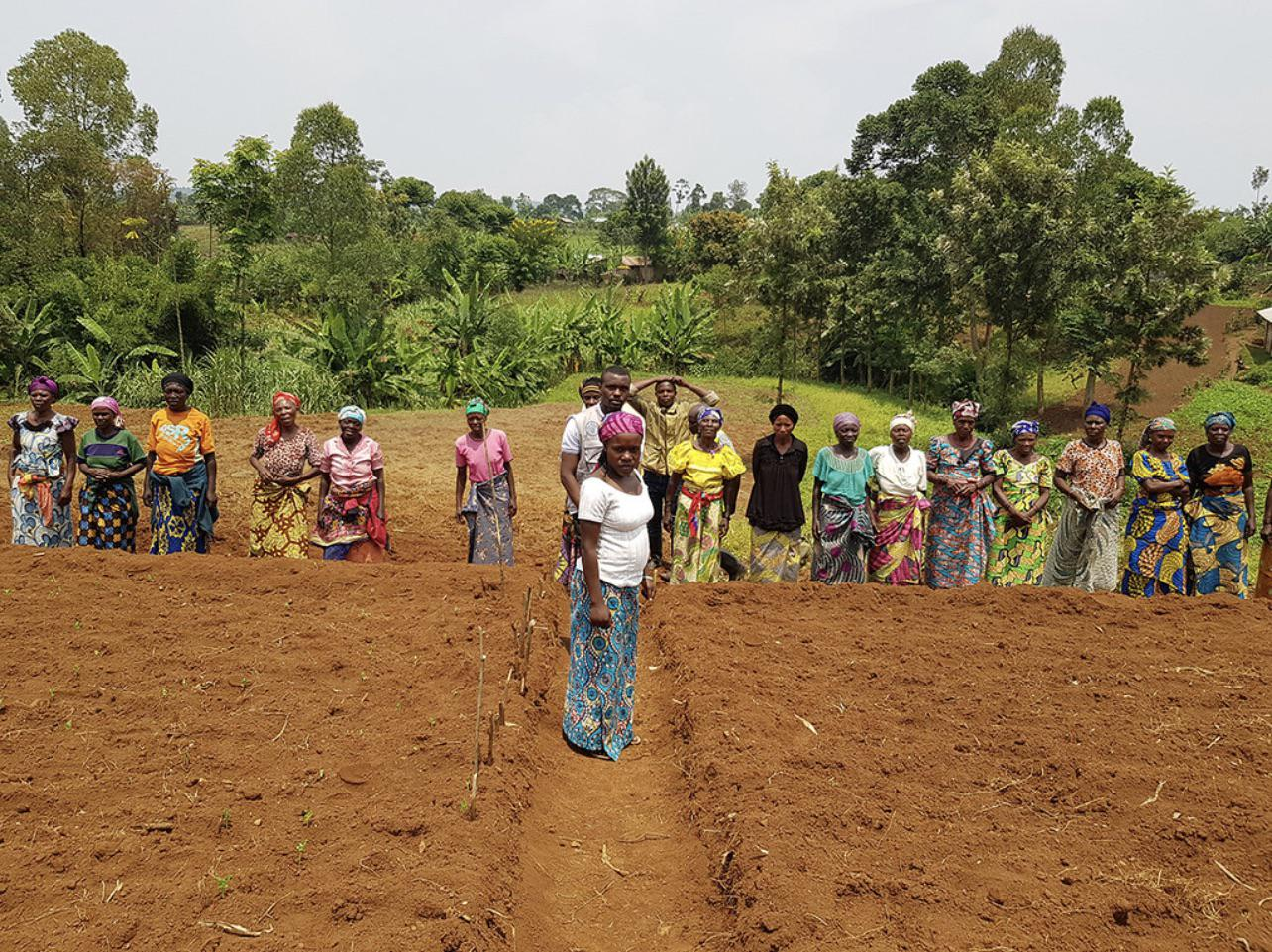
Kasheke farmer field, Kalehe Territory

Kalehe Territory heavily relies on agriculture due to its fertile soils that support significant food production. The area's soil composition, ranging from clayey to sandy clay and water-retentive soils found in marshy valleys and hill basins, are ideal for cultivating staple crops like cassava, beans, maize, peanuts, sorghum, tomatoes, onions, and eggplants, along with various perennial crops. Approximately 75% of the population depends on farming, with small-scale farmers working 56% of the land while large estates rely on sharecropping systems. However, the sector has suffered setbacks, particularly in banana farming, which has shrunk by more than 50% due to the spread of Banana Xanthomonas Wilt (BXW). Meanwhile, the coffee industry experiencing a resurgence, driven by government programs that emphasize quality control, research, infrastructure improvements, and market expansion. The Université Évangélique en Afrique (UEA), in partnership with various organizations, have introduced climate-smart agricultural (CSA) projects in coffee farming, focusing on soil health restoration, agroforestry, the creation of biofertilizers and biopesticides, waste recycling, and water conservation methods.

Livestock farming is practiced mainly in the middle and high plateaus, with small-scale animal husbandry present throughout the territory. Prior to the First Congo War, livestock farming was a thriving sector but has since been severely impacted by insecurity and recurrent conflicts, resulting in significant livestock losses and farm abandonments. Efforts to repopulate livestock are ongoing, and the sector currently accounts for 11% of livelihoods. Fishing, primarily artisanal, is concentrated around the islets and coastal areas but faces challenges due to the perishable nature of fish products and difficulties in marketing.

=== Mining, trade and craft ===
Mining, though largely artisanal, provides livelihoods for 3.5% of the active population. The territory's subsoil is rich in valuable minerals, including gold, cassiterite, coltan, tungsten, quartz, muscovite, copper, and tourmaline. These resources have fueled armed conflicts, with various local and international actors vying for control. Armed groups often exploit these resources to fund their operations, leading to persistent competition for economic dominance.

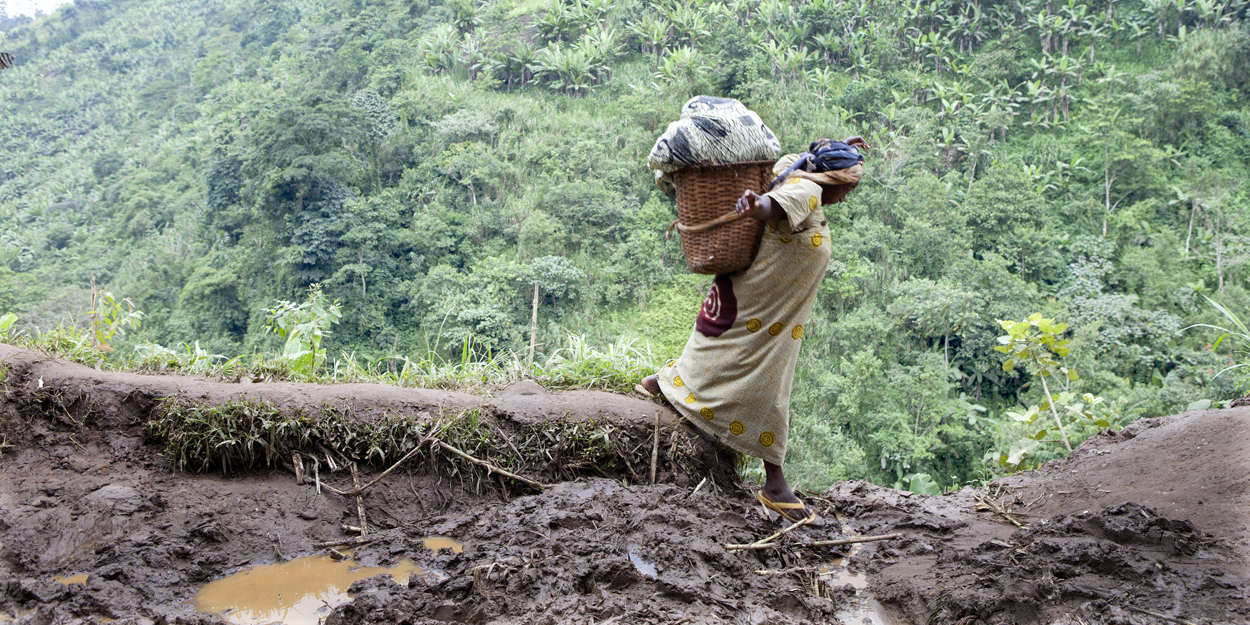
Field visit of the Hombo-Walikale-Masisi-Sake road axis in preparation for rehabilitation by MONUSCO, UNOPS, and DFID

Trade is facilitated by its strategic location and connections to neighboring countries. Commercial activities range from wholesale and retail trade of agricultural products and manufactured goods, such as powdered milk, sugar, soap, and mineral water, to the sale of pharmaceuticals, construction materials, and Bralima products. Trading hubs are mainly concentrated in the north, including Mudaka, Miti, Kavumu, and Katana, as well as in the southern areas of Mumosho and Nyatende. The territory is traversed by National Road No. 3, which serves as a crucial supply route for Bukavu's food markets. However, trade is frequently disrupted by poor transportation infrastructure, especially in remote areas such as Kalonge, Bushaku, Shanje, Numbi, Murambi, Mubugu, and Ziralo, as well as by insecurity in certain regions.

The craft industry faces significant limitations due to a lack of market access. Many artisanal products, particularly those made by the Pygmy communities, struggle to find buyers, as the absence of dedicated sales structures prevents artists from obtaining fair prices.

=== Infrastructure and tourism ===
Kalehe Territory has 346 roads and is crossed by two national roads, National Road No. 2 (RN2) and National Road No. 3 (RN3), spanning 100 km from Kabumbiro-Kasheke to Minova, and the Miti-Hombo road (93 km). The territory has six wooden bridges, 13 concrete bridges, and four metal bridges, and is also accessible by lake using boats and canoes. The lake is navigable throughout the year, connecting Goma, Kalehe, and Bukavu, as well as Bukavu, Kalehe, and Goma, and also Kalehe and Idjwi.

The territory's telecommunications sector is served by Africell, Airtel, Orange, Tigo, and Vodacom. While most networks function reliably, coverage weakens in remote areas. Mobile money services such as Tigocash, M-Pesa, Airtel Money, and Orange Cash facilitate local commerce through SIM card sales, phone credit, and electronic transactions.

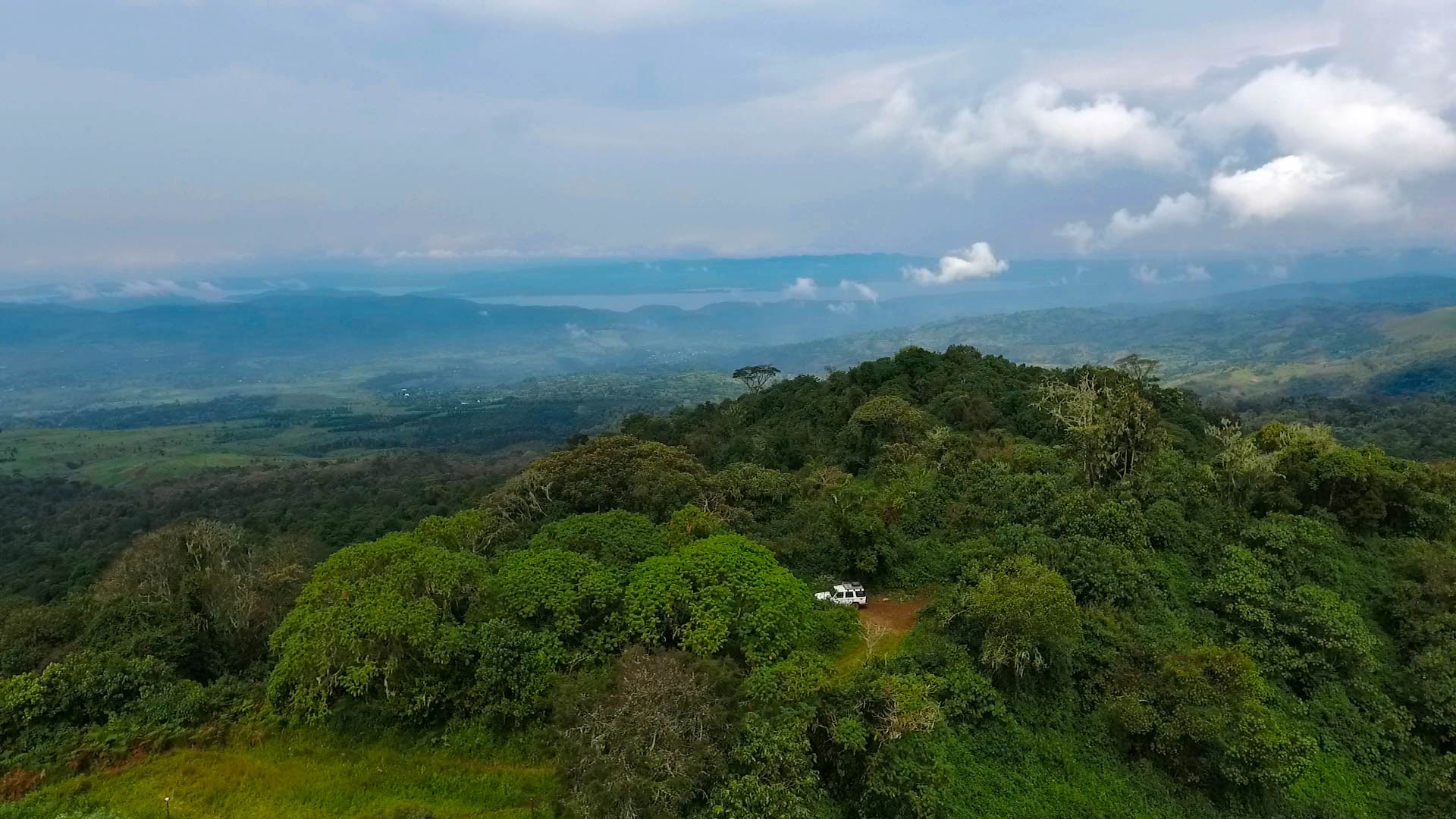
Kahuzi-Biéga National Park

The territory also holds significant tourism potential, particularly with Kahuzi-Biéga National Park, part of which is located within Kalehe. The park is home to eastern lowland gorillas, along with elephants, chimpanzees, and the Prunus africana tree species. Other notable tourist attractions include Mount Kahuzi (3,308 meters), Nyamunene Hill in Mubuku groupement, and several waterfalls, including Maliba Waterfall, known for its hot water, located on the Muhyuza River in Nyamukubi. Additionally, Lutumba Waterfall has the potential to provide hydroelectric power to a significant portion of the territory.

== Demographics ==
As of 2022, Kalehe Territory has an estimated population of 933,181 and is ethnically diverse, predominantly inhabited by Bantu-speaking people, including Havu, Tembo, Rongeronge, Twa, Hutu, and Tutsi communities. The Havu people form the dominant ethnic group in Buhavu Chiefdom, followed by the Tembo, Rongeronge, Hutu, and Tutsi. Within Buhavu, the Havu primarily inhabit Buzi, Mbinga Nord, and Mbinga Sud groupements, while the Baloho clan of the Bashi people reside in Kalima, Mubuku, and Ziralo. The Rongeronge predominantly occupied Kalonge, which was transferred from Kabare Territory to Kalehe Territory in the post-colonial period. In Buloho Chiefdom, the Baloho clan represents the majority. The Hutu and Tutsi settled in the region after territorial subdivisions were drawn and other ethnic groups had already established claims to autochthony.

=== Language ===
Swahili serves as the lingua franca. It is primarily spoken by merchants, travelers, and the upper class, particularly those who interact with non-native visitors. Kihavu is the most widely spoken mother tongue, with 70% of the population using it as their primary language. Kinyarwanda, spoken by 10% of the population, is concentrated in the highland areas inhabited by Rwandophones (Hutu and Tutsi).

=== Education and public services ===
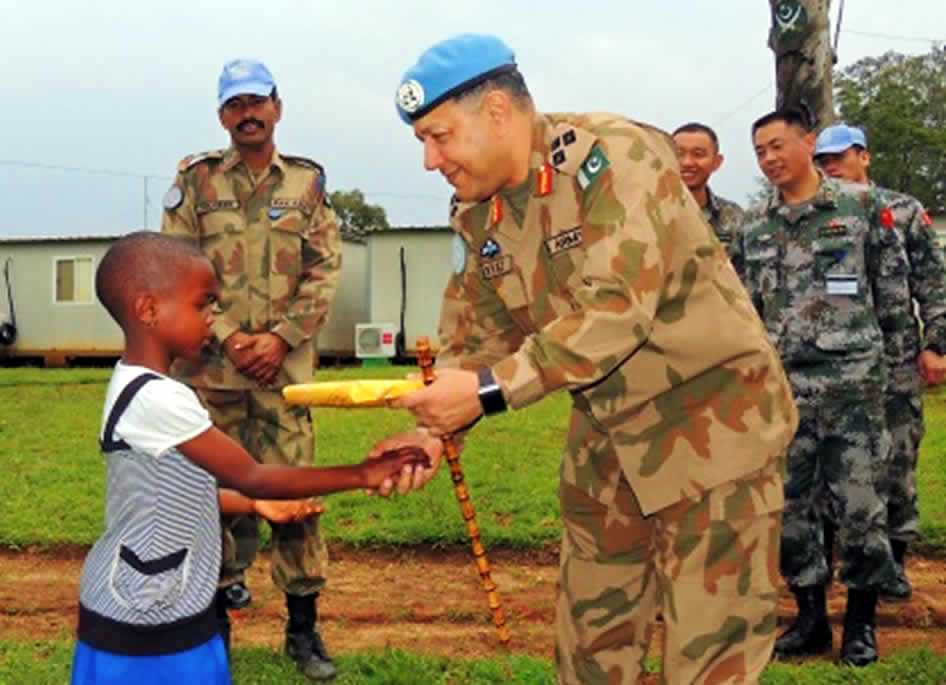
MONUSCO Commander of the South Kivu Brigade meeting and presenting a gift to a local school child at their Operational Base in Kalehe Territory.

Education is supported by various non-governmental organizations (NGOs), including APED (Aides aux Personnes Démunies), GALE, and PED of the 8th CEPAC (Communauté des Églises de Pentecôte en Afrique Centrale), with assistance from Norwegian Church Aid (NCA). While schooling is valued and financially supported by parents, financial constraints continue to pose challenges. The territory has a range of primary and secondary schools. Healthcare infrastructure includes hospitals, health centers, health posts, and pharmacies. Judicial institutions in the area include the Kalehe Peace Court (Tribunal de Paix de Kalehe) and two prisons: Kalehe Centre Prison and Bunyakiri Prison.

== Natural disasters ==
Some natural disasters that affected Kalehe Territory (April 2013 to May 2023):

| Date | Localités (Village) | Human losses | Material damage | Observations |
|---|---|---|---|---|
| 29–30 April 2013 | Nyamasasa | 7 deaths, 7 injured | 10 houses and several fields destroyed | A torrential rainstorm struck Nyamasasa, causing deaths, disappearances, and major material damage. |
| 19 February 2014 | Bunyakiri | 14 deaths, 8 missing | Fields washed away, houses damaged | Landslide |
| 21 September 2014 | Chigoma/Bunyakiri | 3 deaths | No significant damage | Emission of CO or CO_{2} gas |
| 24–26 October 2015 | Nyambasha, Luzira, Rambira, Nyamukubi | 5 deaths, 126 missing | Several houses and fields destroyed | A torrential rainstorm caused many deaths, disappearances, and major material losses. |
| 28 November 2015 | Bushushu | 3 deaths | 19 houses completely destroyed, 30 partially damaged | On 28 November 2015, a violent storm struck the village of Bushushu around 6 p.m. |
| 8 May 2016 | Bushushu and Minova | 3 deaths, 1 injured | Over 245 houses washed away, many fields devastated, 66 houses damaged, 3 school classrooms destroyed (EP Mabula) | Another heavy downpour struck Kalehe Territory, causing deaths and heavy property damage. |
| 15 April 2019 | Mukwidja | 13 deaths, over 150 missing | Boat destroyed, goods and other valuable items lost | On the night of 15–16 April 2019, a boat owned by Soleil de Mukwidja was hit by a large wave on Lake Kivu. Of those on board, 37 survived. President Félix Tshisekedi visited Mukwidja on 18 May 2019 to offer his condolences. |
| 19 September 2021 | Nyakalende/Buzi | 2 deaths, 13 missing from passenger manifest | Boat destroyed, goods and cargo lost | Out of 42 passengers, only a few were confirmed to have boarded from the villages of Makelele, Bubale, and Kasunyu. Final death toll remains unknown. |
| 12 November 2021 | Mushenyi and Nyamukubi | 8 deaths, 20 missing | Boat destroyed, goods lost | A violent wave broke a boat in two, drowning passengers traveling from Mushenyi to Nyamukubi. |

Source: Investigations compiled by Bernard Halimana Hangi with the provincial disaster risk management service of South Kivu, 2023.

=== May 2023 ===
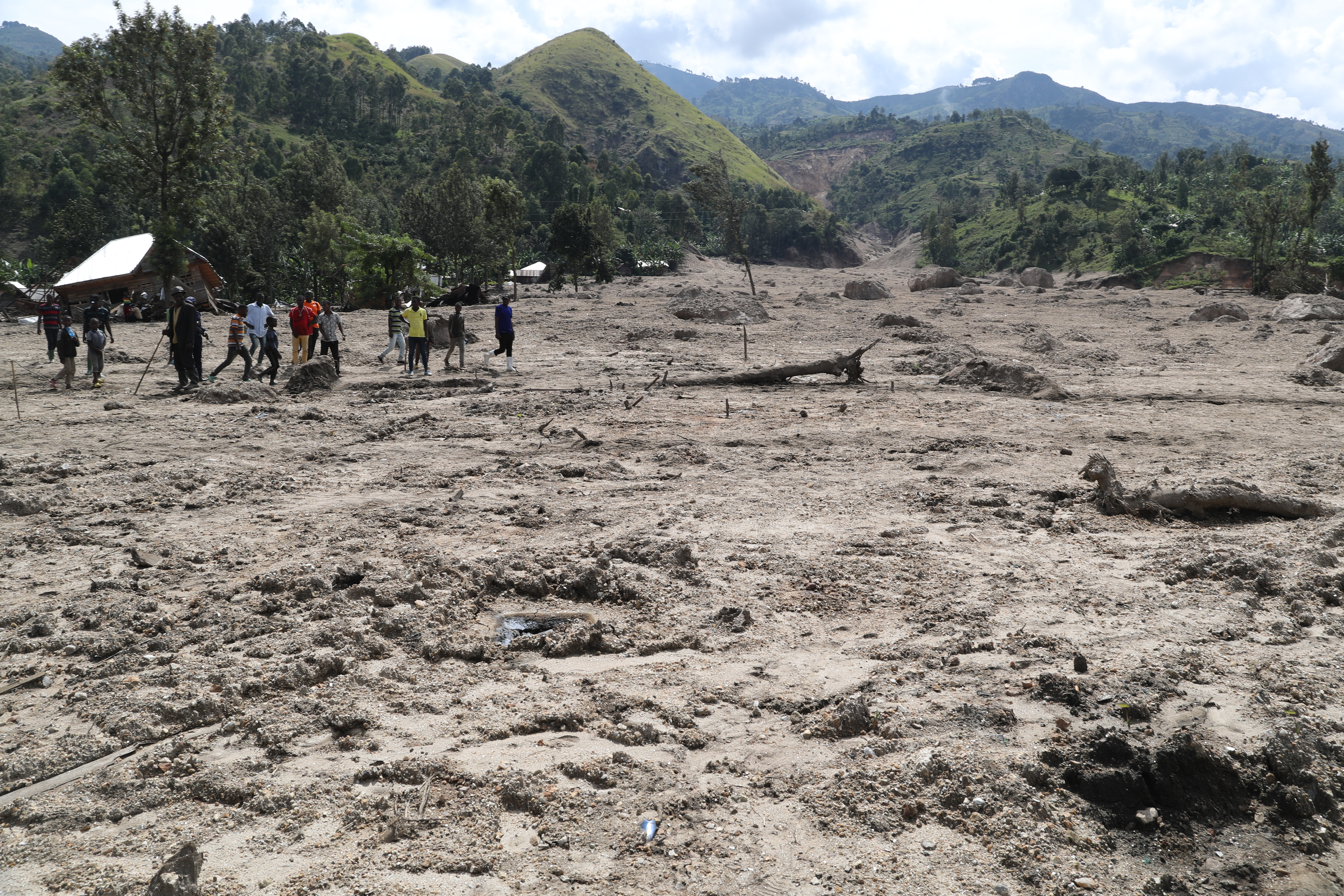
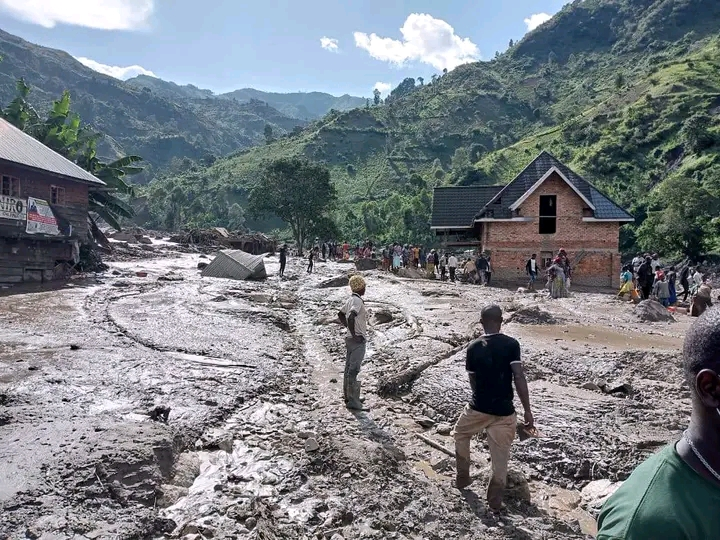
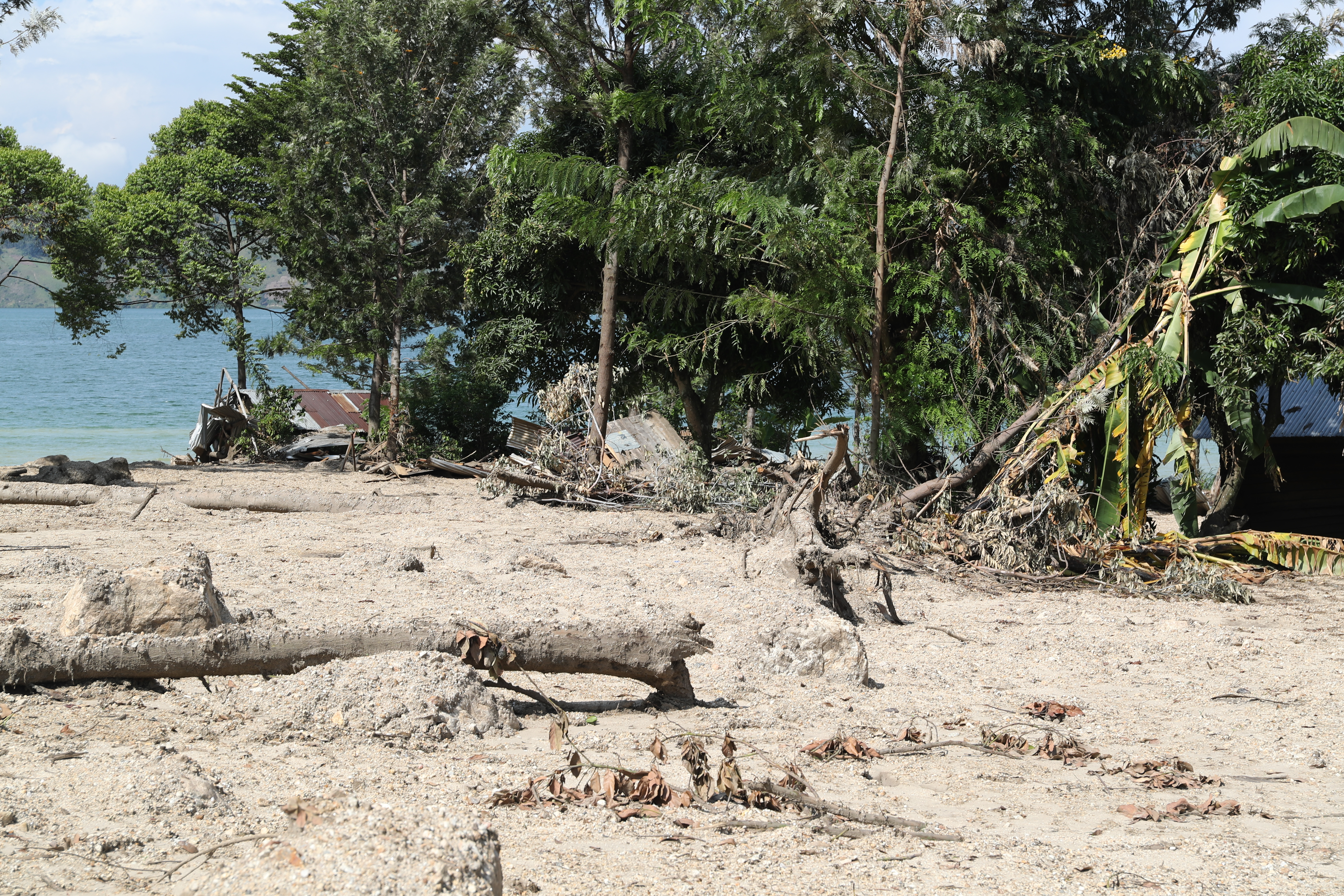
The Kalehe floods

Between 4 and 5 May 2023, heavy rainfall caused the Lwano and Nyamukubi rivers to overflow, which triggered major floods, mudslides, and rockfalls in the Mbinga-Sud groupement of the Buhavu Chiefdom. The disaster affected two health zones, Bushushu and Nyamukubi, with Nyamukubi experiencing the worst impact, leading to the displacement of its population. Official reports confirmed 438 deaths, while more than 5,000 people remained missing, and thousands were affected. The floods destroyed 1,425 homes in Bushushu, along with 425 houses in Nyamukubi, which left hundreds injured and worsened the humanitarian crisis. The disaster also inflicted severe damage to infrastructure. Several segments of National Road No. 5, including Luzira, Bushushu, Nyabibwe, Kiniezire, Mokelele, and Minova, were severed, and multiple bridges in Mbinga Sud, Mbinga Nord, and Buzi groupements were destroyed. Agricultural losses were significant, with 344 fields in Nyamukubi and 257 in Bushushu wiped out. Additionally, 207 cows were swept away, food stocks and agricultural stores were destroyed, and essential equipment such as mills and Mayan fishing nets was lost in Lake Kivu. Some local organizations, such as Appui aux Femmes Démunies et Enfants Marginalisés (AFEDEM), provided emergency medical and food aid, though coordination of relief efforts remained insufficient. The United Nations Office for the Coordination of Humanitarian Affairs (OCHA) initiated an assessment mission to update casualty statistics and support response coordination among local authorities and humanitarian actors. Studies indicate that 92% of affected households struggled to meet basic needs, 91% lived below the poverty line, and 71% experienced losses in family, employment, or means of livelihood. Recovery efforts remain stalled due to challenges such as lack of startup capital, restricted access to credit, and the loss of agricultural land.

== See also ==
- 2002 Kalehe earthquake
