= Kamananga =

Village in Democratic Republic of the Congo

Kamananga is a village in South Kivu, Democratic Republic of the Congo. It was the site of a massacre on 13 May 2012 in which thirty-two people were killed.
