= Orange RDC =

Telecommunications company operating in the Democratic Republic of the Congo

- Company type: Private
- Industry: Telecommunications
- Founded: 2001 (as Congo Chine Télécoms)
- Headquarters: Kinshasa, Democratic Republic of the Congo
- Services: Mobile phone and Internet access
- Number of employees: 100
- Parent: Orange S.A.
- Website: www.orange.cd

Orange RDC (formerly Congo Chine Télécoms or CCT) is a telecommunications company operating in the Democratic Republic of the Congo. The company was originally a joint venture of Chinese company ZTE, who owned 51%, and the Congolese state, who owned 49%. The company's mobile network began operating in 2001. Its head offices are located in Kinshasa. Orange RDC has about 100 employees. In October 2011 France Télécom (now Orange S.A.) acquired 100% of the company and was renamed Orange RDC on 5 December 2012.

== Operations ==
Orange RDC offers telephony, mobile phone and internet service.

As of December 2012, Orange RDC has 1.8 million mobile customers.

== Localization ==
Orange RDC markets a set of localized menus ("Kit A12+") in Lingala, Tshiluba, French, Kongo, and Swahili.
