= Kabare Territory =

Territory in South Kivu, DR Congo

Kabare Territory Wilaya ya Kabare (Swahili)
- Territory
- Territoire de Kabare
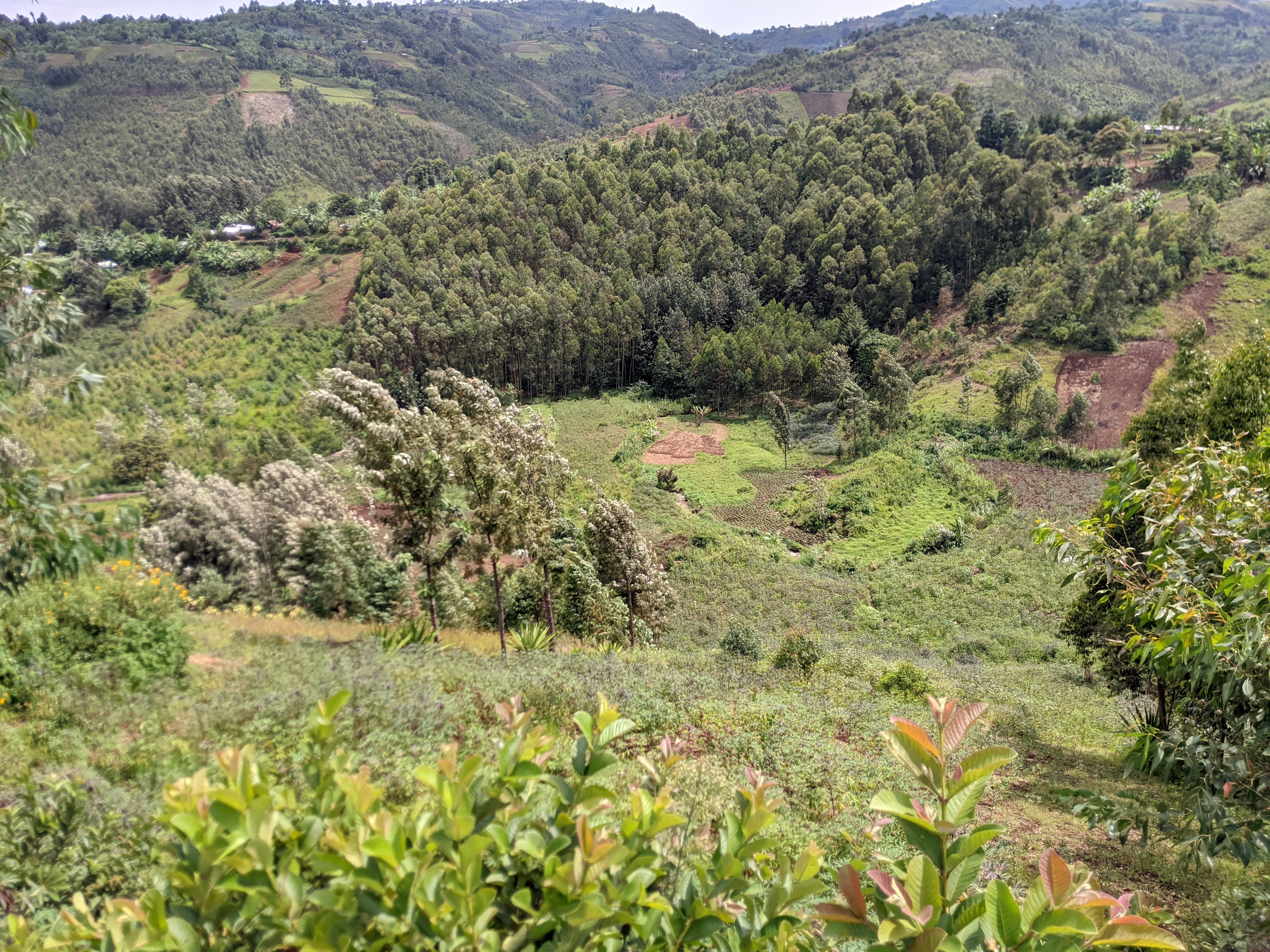
- Interactive map of Kabare Territory
- Location within Democratic Republic of the Congo
- Coordinates: 2.5°S 28.8°E
- Country: DR Congo
- Province: South Kivu

Area
  - Total: 1,960 km^{2} (760 sq mi)

Population (2008 est.)
  - Total: 535,114
  - Density: 273/km^{2} (707/sq mi)
- Time zone: UTC+2 (CAT)

Kabare Territory is a territory in South Kivu, Democratic Republic of the Congo, on the western side of Lake Kivu. Covering an area of approximately 1,960 square kilometers and with an estimated population of 535,114 as of 2008, it is bounded to the north and northwest by Kalehe Territory, to the south by Walungu Territory, to the east by Rwanda and the city of Bukavu, and to the west by Shabunda Territory.

Established on 12 January 1923, Kabare Territory originally encompassed the principal chiefdoms of the Shi people, including Kabare, Kalonge, Nindja, Burhinyi, Kaziba, Luhwindja, and Ngweshe, as well as smaller Pygmy-speaking ethnic groups in the north. However, administrative restructuring led to the division of the original Kabare Territory, formalized by Edict No. 4 of 10 October 1961 passed by the Provincial Assembly of Kivu and later confirmed by Ordinance No. 67-221 of 3 May 1967 under the Republic of Zaire. Kabare Territory is composed of 17 groupements distributed across Kabare and Nindja chiefdoms. The territorial headquarters is located at Nyacibimba, within the Cirunga groupement of Kabare Chiefdom, about four kilometers northwest of Bukavu.

The Shi people constitute the majority of the population. A significant portion of the Kahuzi-Biéga National Park, a UNESCO World Heritage Site known for its biodiversity and mountain gorillas, lies in the territory.

== Geography ==
=== Relief and topography ===
Kabare Territory lies in the southern part of the Kivu Graben, in the southwestern zone of Lake Kivu. It extends between 28°30′ and 29° east longitude and 2° to 2°30′ south latitude. The territory's relief is shaped by the morphology of the tectonic rift valley that defines the Kivu Graben. From west to east, beginning at the shores of Lake Kivu, the landscape rises progressively toward the upper Ruzizi Plain, where a succession of stepped terraces forms a distinct geomorphological pattern. The first terrace, situated at an altitude of approximately 1,600 meters, borders the lake and extends from Bukavu to Katana. It consists of the tabular peninsulas of Kageshe, Nirunga, and Katana, and is bounded on its western side by a steep escarpment leading to the second platform, the Kabare plateaus, which average 1,900 meters in elevation. This plateau, in turn, is dominated by another escarpment that culminates at the Musisi level, around 2,400 meters above sea level. The Musisi plateau contains broad, nearly continuous marshy expanses, remnants of an ancient lake once drained by the upper Luka River, and includes a network of interconnected swamps such as Lushanja and Musisi.

The Musisi level lies at the base of the "Mur Fault" escarpment, along which stand the Kahuzi-Biéga volcanoes. These three major terraces merge northward into a single steep slope known as the "Mur Fault cliff", which rises above the Bay of Kalehe Territory. These superimposed steps, vestiges of the former graben floors, are geologically ancient, their elevated altitudes indicating their considerable age. Kabare Territory's landscape is dominated by rolling hills, often separated by flat-bottomed or marshy valleys. Deep valleys are rare, as the flow of torrents and small rivers is generally insufficient to erode them deeply. The slopes are typically steep but short.

=== The Nindja highlands and hydrography ===
The Nindja Chiefdom in the territory is a mountainous area of moderate altitude characterized by rugged terrain and limited accessibility. Numerous mountain chains, including Bugari, Mushabati, Mushwere, Mulume-Munene, and Kabuye, rise above 2,000 meters, forming the hydrographic divides between the main rivers Lugulu, Kanoso, Kalugwe, and Lubimbe. The general slope descends eastward from these mountain ranges, defining the natural drainage pattern of the region. While the Shangugu and Ndolero-Lubimbe valleys have been almost entirely deforested and converted into pastureland, the greater part of Nindja Chiefdom remains covered with dense transitional forests, a type of vegetation that forms an ecological bridge between the western lowland rainforests and the eastern montane ombrophilous forests.

Kabare Territory's hydrographic network is part of the Lake Kivu and Ruzizi River basin. The rivers are predominantly torrential, originating in the mountainous watershed that surrounds the Kivu depression. The main waterways include Nyawarongo (also spelled Nyabarongo), Lwiro, Langa, Mushunva, Mpungwe, Murhundu, Nyaciduduma, Nyakave, Mulehe, Cigongo, Lugulu, Kanoso, Kalugwe, and Lubimbe. During the dry season, most streams partially dry up, though they remain capable of rapidly swelling with water following heavy rainfall.

=== Vegetation ===
Kabare Territory has three main species distributed across four dominant botanical families, Poaceae, Fabaceae, Asteraceae, and Commelinaceae. Among these, Poaceae species such as Digitaria abyssinica, Brachiaria ruziziensis, and Tripsacum andersonii are the most prevalent. Species belonging to the Fabaceae family include mainly Crotalaria spinosa and Desmodium intortum.

=== Administration and governance ===
Kabare Territory, officially established on 12 January 1923, is one of the eight decentralized territorial entities that constitute South Kivu Province. At its establishment, the territory encompassed all major Shi traditional chiefdoms of Kabare, Kalonge, Nindja, Burhinyi, Kaziba, Luhwindja, and Ngweshe, along with a small number of Pygmy populations in the northern part of the territory who shared the Shi language and culture. The territory's first administrator, Mr. Terlinden, presided over its early colonial governance. Initially vast and unified, Kabare Territory's administrative boundaries were later reduced through a formal division enacted by Edict No. 4 of 10 October 1961 passed by the Provincial Assembly of Kivu, which separated Kabare and Walungu into two distinct territories. This division was legally reinforced by Ordinance No. 67-221 of 3 May 1967, promulgated by the President of the Republic of Zaire, which then confirmed the present territorial structure.

Kabare Territory is organized into two traditional chiefdoms: Kabare Chiefdom and Nindja Chiefdom, comprising a total of 17 groupements, each also subdivided into multiple localités (localities or villages). The administrative leadership of the territory is entrusted to a Territorial Administrator, assisted by two Deputy Territorial Administrators. These officials are appointed by the President of the Republic upon the recommendation of the Minister of the Interior and Security, Decentralization, and Customary Affairs, following proposals from the Provincial Governor. Acting as the representative of the State and the Province, the Territorial Administrator and their deputies are also vested with the powers of judicial police officers with general jurisdiction, enabling them to mobilize state services when required for public interest. Their duties include maintaining public order, executing government policies, and overseeing local development projects. Periodic administrative and statistical reports are submitted to the Provincial Governor, who subsequently forwards them to the national Ministry of the Interior and Security, Decentralization, and Customary Affairs.

==== Kabare Chiefdom ====
No.	Groupement	Population
1.	Bugobe	28,487
2.	Bushwira	44,741
3.	Bugorhe	61,968
4.	Bushumba	44,437
5.	Cirunga	54,804
6.	Irhambi-Katana	53,513
7.	Ishungu	7,689
8.	Kagabi	37,822
9.	Luhihi	25,435
10	Lugendo	18,011
11	Mudaka	39,815
12	Mudusa	62,452
13	Mumosho	38,602
14	Miti	17,613
Total		536,114

==== Nindja Chiefdom ====
No.	Groupement	Population
01	Ihembe	13,407
02	Irhega Barhonyi	7,943
03	Luhago	8,000
Total		29,350

Source: Administrative Office of Kabare Territory, Annual Report 2008.

== History ==
Kabare Territory's history is closely linked with that of Bushi, a cultural region inhabited mainly by the Shi people. According to oral tradition, the origins of the Kabare dynasty trace back to a legendary matriarch named Namuhoye, who is said to have given birth to eight children: Kabare, Narhana, Kalunzi, Naburhinyi, Lubobolo, Nnaninja, Kadusi-Ngombe, and Nyibunga, the only daughter. Although little is known about Namuhoye herself, tradition places her life and lineage within the present-day Mwenga Territory, particularly in Luindi Chiefdom, from where her sons dispersed to found distinct dynasties across the Bushi region. The Bushi dynasty, regarded as the cradle of several Shi chiefdoms, originated with Kabare, Namuhoye's eldest son. It was from this lineage that the Ngweshe dynasty later emerged when one of Kabare's descendants established a separate domain.

Some versions of the oral tradition recount that Kabare himself fled to the Bunyoro Kingdom (in present-day Uganda), which was then overpopulated, before migrating westward with his followers and possessions to found new settlements. Scholarly interpretations, notably those of Professor Bishikwabo Chubaka, provide a historical framework for understanding these traditions by explaining that the Bushi region historically consisted of two principal blocs, Kabare in the north and Ngweshe in the south, both governed by customary chiefs descending from a common ancestor named Nabushi, regarded as the ancient mwami of Bushi. Despite their shared lineage, Kabare and Ngweshe evolved into politically independent entities, each governed by its own royal line. As for Nabushi's origins, two principal theories exist: one contends that he migrated from the eastern shores of Lake Kivu, crossing the Ruzizi River before settling in the Bushi region, while the other asserts that he originated from the western side of the lake and later expanded into the same territory. In either case, Nabushi and his descendants are believed to have displaced earlier inhabitants, pushing them into forested areas and consolidating control over the fertile highlands. It was within this process of territorial consolidation that Kabare emerged as a dominant polity, and until the 19th century, the mwami of Kabare retained recognition as the sovereign ruler of all Bushi.

Administratively, Kabare Territory was formally established under colonial rule on 12 January 1923. At its creation, the territory encompassed the principal Shi chiefdoms, Kabare, Kalonge, Nindja, Burhinyi, Kaziba, Luhwindja, and Ngweshe, along with small Pygmy-speaking ethnic groups in the north. Its first recorded administrator was Mr. Terlinden, appointed during the early Belgian colonial administration. As population and governance structures evolved, the vast territorial unit proved unwieldy, prompting its division into smaller administrative areas. This process was initiated by Edict No. 4 of 10 October 1961, passed by the Provincial Assembly of Kivu, which officially separated Kabare and Walungu into distinct territories. The decision was subsequently ratified at the national level by Ordinance No. 67-221 of 3 May 1967, issued by the President of the Republic of Zaire.

On 7 August 2015, the 2015 South Kivu earthquake, a magnitude 5.8 earthquake, struck 35 km (22 mi) north northeast of Kabare at a depth of 12.0 km (7.5 mi).

== Economy ==
=== Agriculture ===
Agriculture constitutes the main livelihood for the vast majority of inhabitants in Kabare Territory, where the agrarian structure is predominantly based on smallholder family farming, with most households cultivating less than one hectare of land. Within Kabare Chiefdom, 43.9% of farmers operate plots smaller than 0.5 hectares, whereas only 17.3% control landholdings exceeding 2 hectares, typically belonging to plantation owners and local elites. The average farm size across the territory is estimated at 0.78 hectares. Land is primarily obtained through inheritance, accounting for 53.2% of cases, followed by purchase at 32.6%, and sharecropping at 12%. These tenure systems have entrenched disparities in land distribution, concentrating vast tracts in the hands of influential figures and religious institutions, while the majority of smallholders are left with minimal and fragmented plots. This imbalance has contributed to excessive land use, soil depletion, and recurring disputes over property boundaries and inheritance rights.

Production is centered on subsistence crops, such as cassava, maize, beans, potatoes, and sweet potatoes, complemented by modest production of perennial crops like coffee and bananas. Farmers mainly employ traditional methods, characterized by continuous cultivation without fallow periods, limited fertilizer use, and inadequate soil conservation measures. Consequently, agricultural yields are insufficient to satisfy household food demands, giving rise to chronic food shortages. Many families depend on local markets, the nearby city of Bukavu, and imports from Rwanda to supplement their diets. The primary imported foodstuffs include maize flour (35%), cassava flour (24%), beans (17%), potatoes (8%), and sweet potatoes (3%).

==== Land tenure and rural inequality ====
Land in Kabare Territory is governed by customary and statutory systems, which often overlap and generate ambiguity. While the national Land Law No. 73-021 of 20 July 1973, amended by Law No. 80-008 of 18 July 1980, declares that all land is State property, the rural populations within the territory's chiefdoms largely continue to regard the mwami as the legitimate authority in matters of land distribution. This coexistence of systems has encouraged informal land dealings and frequent conflicts. Only about 24% of cultivators hold official land titles, primarily large plantation owners, while most farmers rely on customary tenure or informal "purchase receipts" that lack legal recognition.

The absence of effective land registration services, compounded by poverty and illiteracy, discourages land formalization. As a result, land disputes are widespread, 53% concerning boundaries between neighbors, and 30% involving inheritance issues, while other cases stem from fraudulent sales and land grabbing by influential local elites. These challenges have perpetuated a vicious cycle of poverty and dependency, forcing many villagers to work as day laborers on plantations for less than 0.31 USD per day, while others turn to petty trading to survive. Once a major food-producing area, Kabare Territory has now become a net importer of basic agricultural products.

=== Livestock ===
Smallholder extensive systems dominate livestock production. These systems rely heavily on communal grazing and continuous grazing without rotation, as well as intensive systems, which emphasize stall feeding and managed paddocks. The principal livestock species include goats, cattle, and sheep, with goats being the most prevalent, present on about 75% of farms due to their resilience and adaptability. Average herd sizes vary by territory, with the Uvira Territory leading with 25 Tropical Livestock Units (TLU), followed by 2.7 in Kabare Territory and 2.6 in Walungu Territory. Cattle, although less numerous, account for over 90% of the total feed demand.

== Infrastructure ==
Kabare Territory's transport network is anchored by National Road No. 2 (RN2), which serves as the main link between Bukavu and Goma. The territory is traversed by other major national routes, National Road No. 3 (RN3), and National Road No. 5 (RN5). Situated near RN2, Lake Kivu functions as the province's principal navigable waterway that offers significant potential for the continuous transport of agricultural goods throughout the year. In addition to boats, transportation within the territory relies on trucks for freight, cars for passenger travel, and motorcycles and bicycles for small-scale movement of people and goods. Kabare Territory also hosts Kavumu Airport, the province's main airport, with routes connecting to Kinshasa, Goma, Lubumbashi, Namoya, Kindu, Kalemie, Minembwe, Kongolo, Shabunda, Lulimba, Lulinga, Kasese, Kalima, and even to Uganda and Rwanda. Despite this multimodal access by road, air, and lake, the territory's agricultural service roads, storage and processing facilities, and utilities such as water and energy infrastructure are severely deteriorated.
