= Tembo language =

Bantu language spoken in Democratic Republic of the Congo

Tembo
- Kitembo
- Chitembo
- Native to: Democratic Republic of the Congo
- Region: Kivu
- Ethnicity: Tembo, Great Lakes Twa
- Native speakers: 500,000 to 700,000 (2023)
- Language family: Niger–Congo?: Atlantic–Congo; Benue–Congo; Bantoid; Bantu; Northeast Bantu; Great Lakes Bantu; Shi–Havu; Tembo
- Writing system: Latin, Hangul (Twa)

Language codes
- ISO 639-3: tbt
- Glottolog: temb1270
- Guthrie code: JD.531

Tembo – in the language itself Chitembo and in Swahili Kitembo – is a Bantu language spoken by people in the eastern part of the Democratic Republic of the Congo, in the Kivu provinces just to the west of Lake Kivu.

== Writing System ==
Two scripts have been adapted to Tembo.

=== Latin alphabet ===
A Latin Tembo alphabet was devised by Belgian missionaries for the general Tembo-speaking population.

Latin alphabet
a	aa	b	ch	e	ee	f	h	i	ii	k	l	m	mb	mv	n
nd	ng	nj	ny	nz	o	oo	p	r	s	sh	t	u	uu	w	y

=== Hangul alphabet ===
A Hangul Tembo alphabet was designed specifically for the Twa community.

In 2015, the sister of a Twa leader visited South Korea for a cultural-exchange event organized by Korean missionaries in the Congo. She learned that the Korean Hangul alphabet had been adapted for the Cia-Cia language in Indonesia, and thought it could help her people, who had been expelled from their land with the expansion of the Kahuzi-Biéga National Park and were mostly illiterate. Four Korean linguists developed a Hangul alphabet for Chitembo over the next few years. Teachers from a Hangul school in Los Angeles, California, taught that alphabet to primary-school teachers from Bunyakiri, eastern Congo. Those school teachers, along with the missionaries in the region, in turn taught it to members of the Twa community. As of 2023, they reported that 40 adults and 300 children had been taught the Hangul alphabet. Children could write their names within half an hour, but the adults took months to do the same.
