= Ngweshe Chiefdom =

Chiefdom in Walungu Territory, South Kivu

- Chiefdom
- Chefferie de Ngweshe
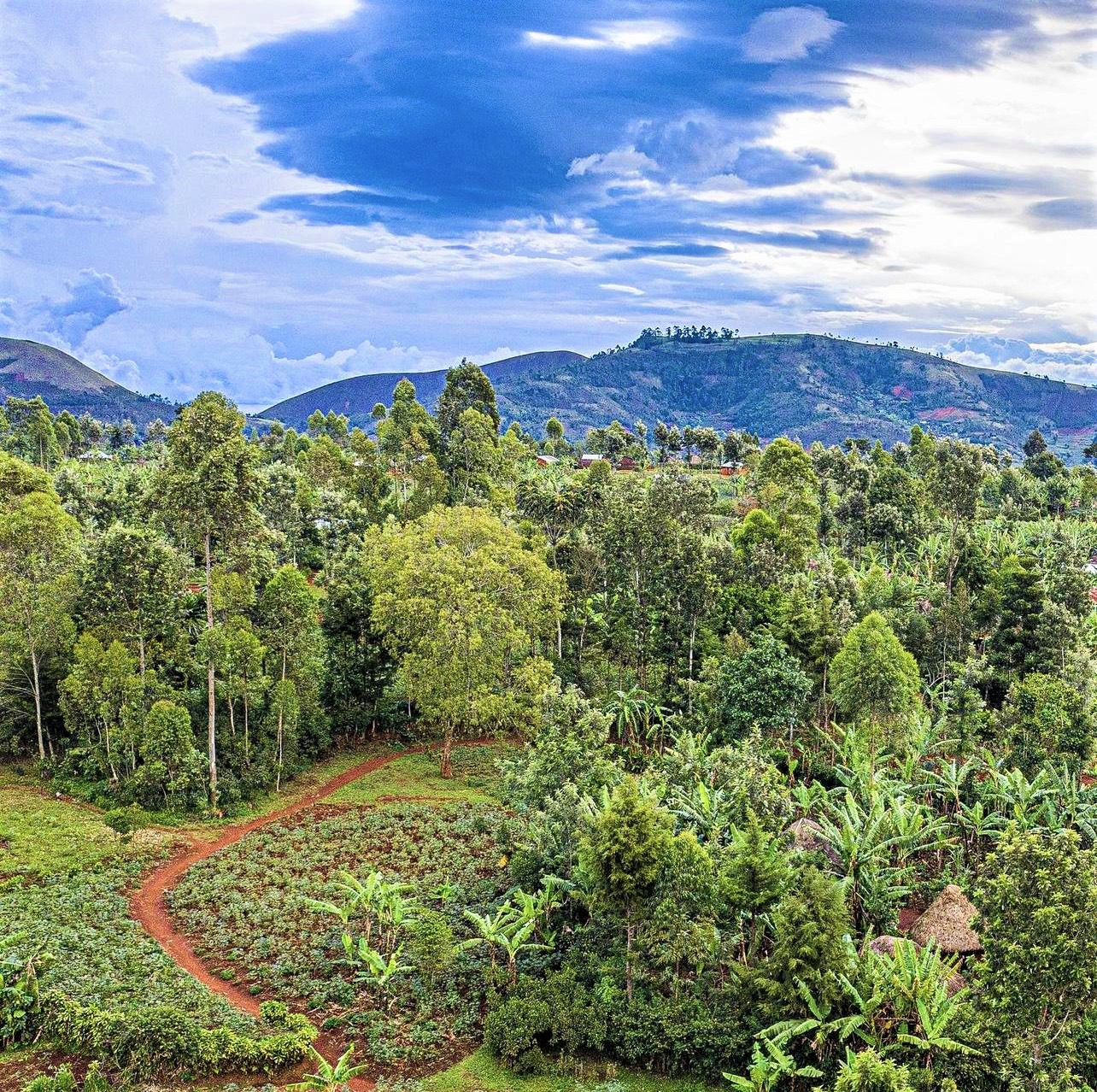
- The landscape view of Ngweshe Chiefdom
- Country: Democratic Republic of the Congo
- Province: South Kivu
- Territory: Walungu

Government
  - Mwami: Pierre Ndatabaye Weza III

Area
  - Total: 1,599 km^{2} (617 sq mi)

Population (2018)
  - Total: 672,436
- Time zone: UTC+2 (CAT)
- Official language: French
- National language: Kiswahili

The Ngweshe Chiefdom (French: Chefferie de Ngweshe) is a chiefdom located in Walungu Territory, within the South Kivu province of the Democratic Republic of the Congo. Covering an area of 1,599 square kilometers, it shares borders with Kabare Territory to the north, Rwanda and Burundi to the northeast, Mwenga Territory and Shabunda Territory to the south, and Kaziba Chiefdom to the east. According to the territory's 2018 annual report, the chiefdom has an estimated population of 672,436.

Ngweshe is administratively divided into 16 groupements, which are further subdivided into villages (localités). The Bashi people form the majority population, alongside smaller communities of Barega, Bafuliiru, and Bavira. The chiefdom is governed by a traditional leader known as the Mwami. The most widely spoken language is Mashi, while French serves as the official language and Kiswahili as a national lingua franca. Ngweshe Chiefdom has been regarded as a major agricultural hub of South Kivu, with an economy based on subsistence and industrial farming, livestock breeding, and trade. Among the Bushi chiefdoms, Ngweshe Chiefdom and Kabare Chiefdom are considered the most prominent in terms of land area, population, and cultural influence.

== Geography ==
=== Location ===
Ngweshe Chiefdom is located within Walungu Territory in the South Kivu province of the Democratic Republic of the Congo. Geographically, it is delineated by several natural features. To the north, it is bordered by the Kazinzi, Bishanyi, and Nyakabongola rivers, as well as the summit of Kampuse, which separates it from Kabare Chiefdom. To the south, it is bounded by the Luzinzi and Kadubo rivers, forming natural frontiers with the Bafuliiru, Kaziba, Burhinyi, and Luhwindja Chiefdoms. To the east, the chiefdom is bordered by the Ruzizi River, which serves as an international boundary with the Republic of Rwanda, particularly at the locations of Karhongo-Nyangezi and Kamanyola. The western boundary is established through Nindja Chiefdom, across the Luzinzi River.

=== Topography and elevation ===
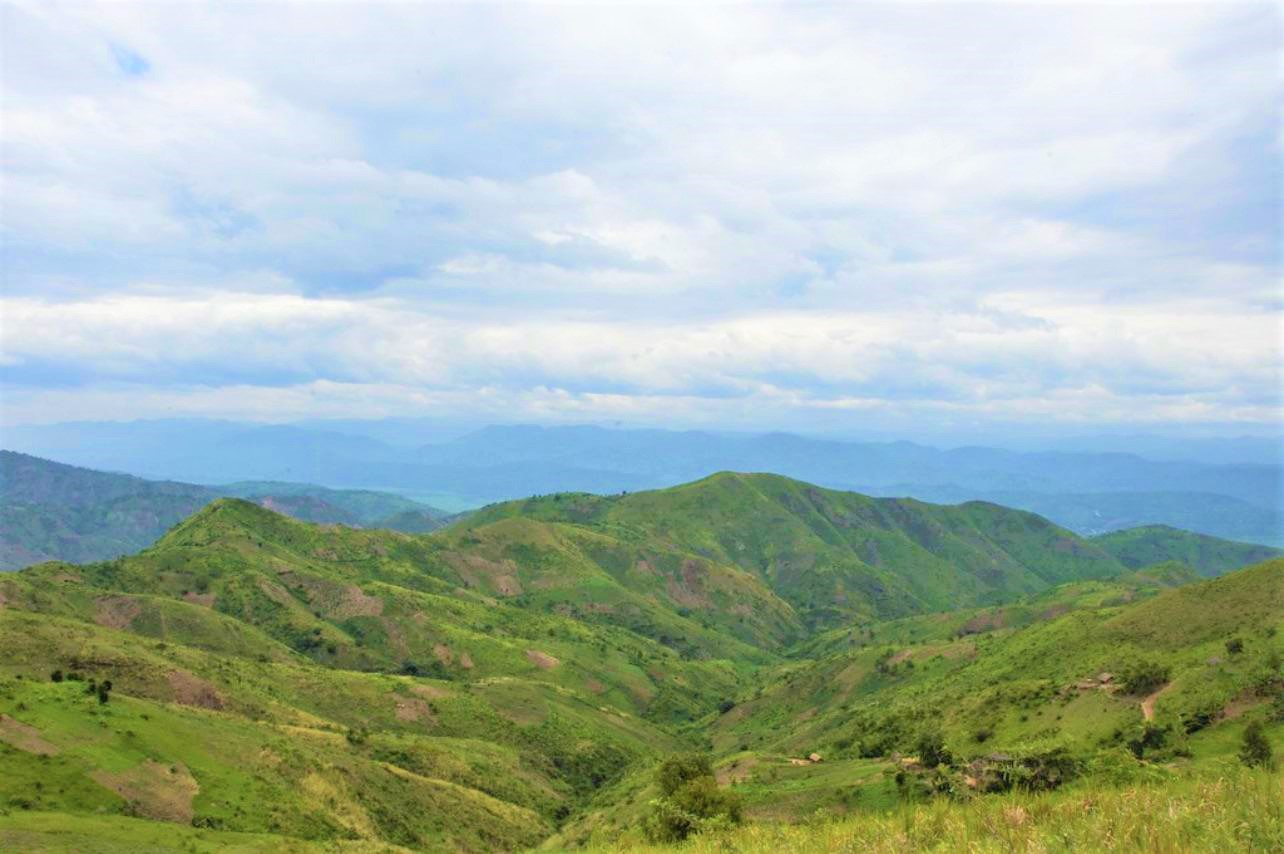
Kamanyola high plateau situated in the Ruzizi Plain within the Ngweshe Chiefdom, April 2023

Ngweshe Chiefdom is situated within the mountainous region of Kivu, characterized by an average elevation ranging between 1,800 and 2,000 meters above sea level. The chiefdom's elevation varies significantly, with the lowest point at Kamanyola reaching 1000 meters and the highest peak, Nidunga, standing at 2900 meters. The topography is notably rugged, dominated by mountains, hills, plateaus, and deep valleys. These mountainous formations are an extension of the Mitumba Mountain Range. A significant portion of the chiefdom lies within the Ruzizi Plain, which forms part of the western branch of the East African Rift, specifically the Albertine Rift. This region, located between the Mitumba Mountains and the Ruzizi River, includes important agricultural zones such as Kamanyola, Burhale, Kaniola, Mulambi, Ngando, Irongo, and Karhongo. Prominent peaks in Ngweshe Chiefdom include Nidunga (2900 meters), Mirhumba (2600 meters), Mulume Munene (2600 meters), Bisinzu (2520 meters), and Bangwe (2400 meters). Several groupements within Ngweshe feature steep and rugged terrains, notably Kaniola, Izege, Luciga, Karhongo, Rubimbi, and Mushinga. In contrast, the lowland areas of the chiefdom are characterized by extensive marshlands, which serve as vital agricultural zones. Major marshes include Nyamubanda in Karhongo-Nyangezi (1,050 hectares), Nyalugana in Lurhala (900 hectares), Cidorho in Mulamba-Burhale (450 hectares), Cisheke in Walungu, and Ibere in Burhale. These wetlands support the cultivation of a variety of crops, including beans, cassava, sorghum, sweet potatoes, and vegetables.

=== Geology and soil types ===
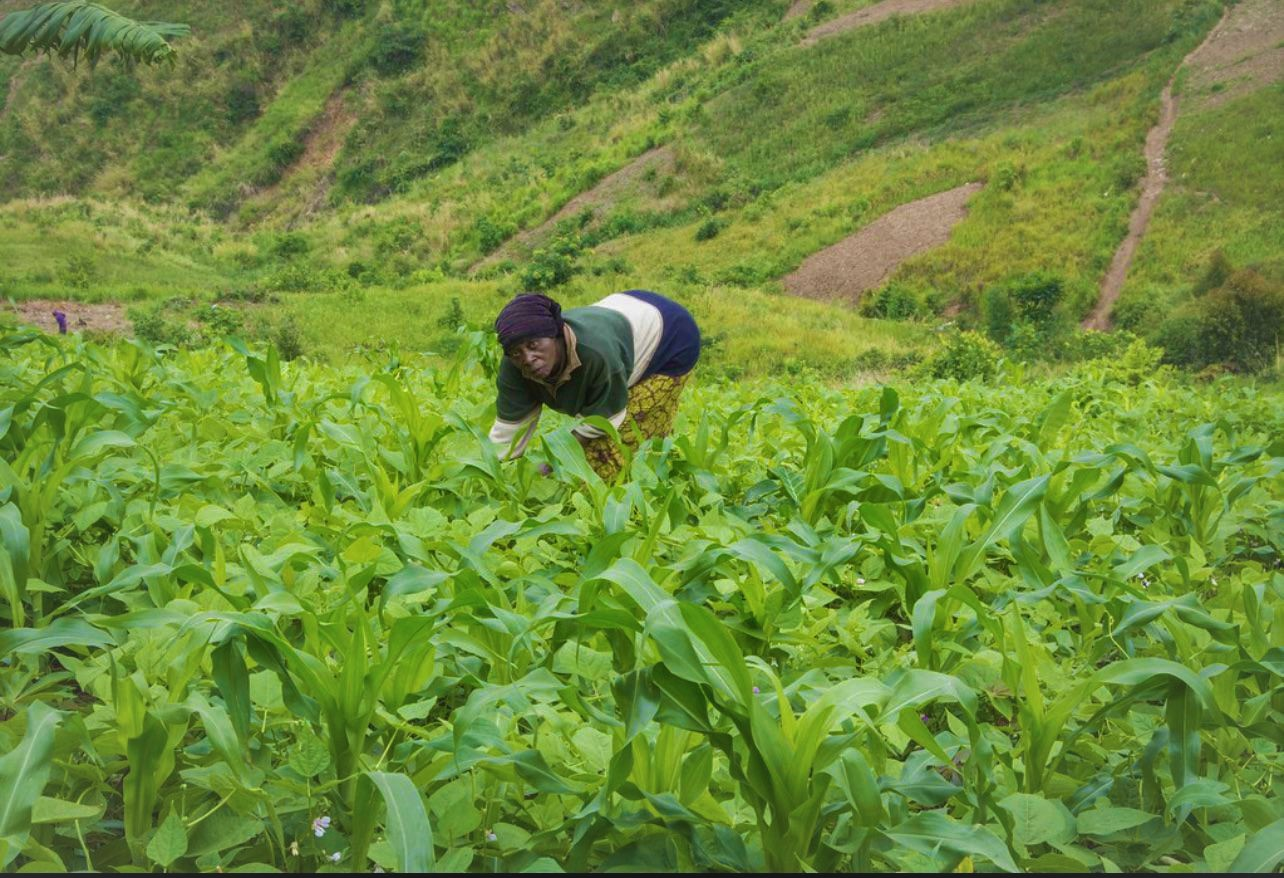
A farmer in Kamanyola

Ngweshe Chiefdom includes a variety of soil types that differ based on geographical features—steep mountainous areas, plateaus, and lowlands adjacent to watercourses. The central part of the chiefdom, encompassing Walungu, Izege, Ikoma, Burhale, and Lurhala groupements, predominantly features four soil formations. The alteration of basaltic materials has resulted in red or red-brown clay soils, varying with the degree of rock decomposition. The typical soil profile consists of a slightly humus-rich horizon, which can reach depths of 40 cm, resting on a compacted transitional layer measuring 10 to 20 cm in thickness. These soils exhibit a sand content of approximately 10%, with fine elements composing between 85% and 90%. Erosion significantly influences soil composition, especially in plateau regions where the humus-rich layer can be eroded away.

Soils derived from schists and quartzites found in the reddish-brown hills are generally less clayey and compact than their basalt counterparts. The old alluvial soils present in the lowlands are typically heavy and very clayey, with common colors including blue, yellow, and gray. These alluvial soils have agricultural significance, particularly due to their shallow water table during the dry season; however, controlled drainage is necessary during the rainy season. The alluvium varies greatly in profile, with a higher content of coarse elements.

Marshy areas, which are currently underutilized, are composed of mineral layers rich in partially decomposed organic matter and can reach depths of less than 50 cm. Underlying these layers is an organic horizon that can be as deep as 2 to 3 meters in certain locations. The pressure of population density and livestock has led to the degradation of these marshlands through bushfires and erosion, resulting in a loss of the once-present humus layer. As a result, the soils are characterized as compact and poorly permeable to rainwater, leading to runoff rather than infiltration.

=== Hydrology ===
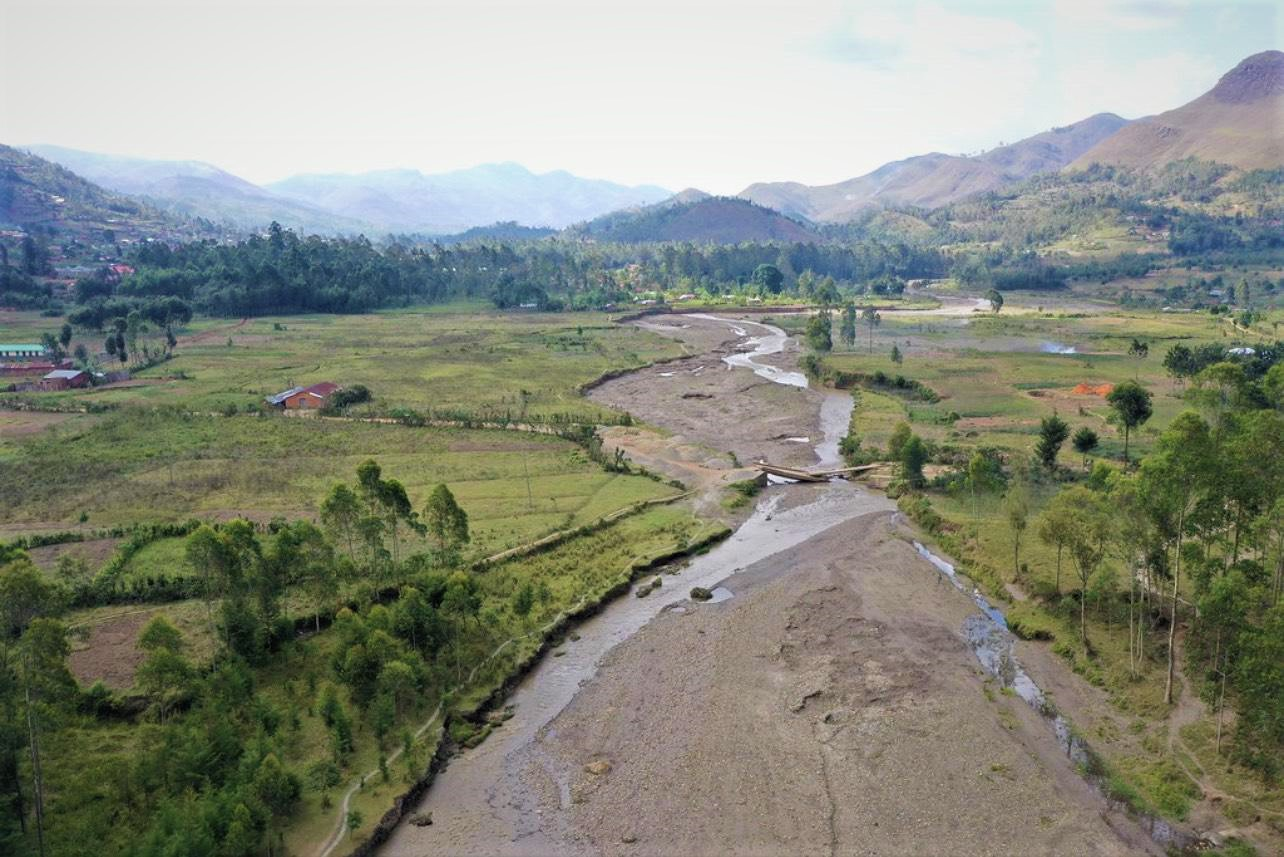
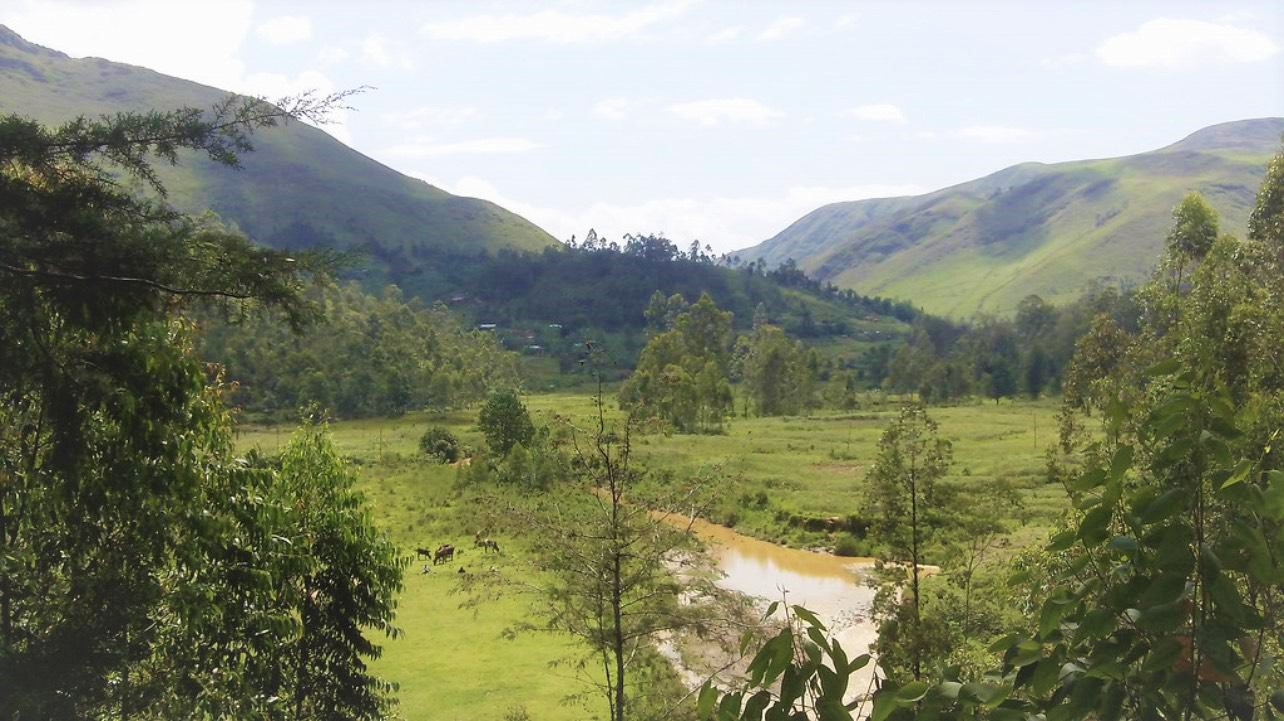
The Luzinzi River is a significant watercourse situated in the Ruzizi River Basin

The chiefdom's waters belong to two key watersheds: the Ulindi River Basin and the Ruzizi River Basin.

- Ulindi River Basin: This basin channels the waters of 13 groupements, including Walungu, Burhale, Mulamba, Tubimbi, Kaniola, Izege, Ikoma, Lurhala, Irongo, Luchiga, Lubona, Mushinga, and Nduba. Significant rivers in this basin include the Mubimbi (or Nkombo) River, which originates in the Mulume Munene massif and receives tributaries from the Walungu, Burhale, and Tubimbi regions before flowing into the Ulindi River. The Kahungwe River arises in Lurhala and flows through Irongo and Mushinga before discharging into the Nkombo River. The Kadubo River forms a natural boundary with Luhwinja and traverses Mushinga, eventually flowing into the Elila River.
- Ruzizi River Basin: This basin drains water from the Kashenyi (or Kamanyola), Karhongo (or Nyangezi), and Kamisimbi groupements. Key rivers include the Mugera, sourced in the Nyanfunze Mountains and draining waters from Karhongo, including thermal waters from Mahyuza; the Mugaba River, rising in the Kaziba Chiefdom; and the Luzinzi River, which crosses Kaziba Chiefdom and collects the majority of its water from the region. Additional rivers include the Boga River, originating in the Ngali village of the Karhongo groupement.

Ngweshe Chiefdom also features numerous smaller rivers, streams, and marshes in nearly every valley. Despite many water sources being untapped, humanitarian efforts by various non-governmental organizations have led to the development of important springs and water supply systems in groupements like Walungu, Burhale, Mushinga, and Karhongo. These initiatives have contributed significantly to reducing waterborne diseases within the chiefdom, particularly cholera.

=== Vegetation ===
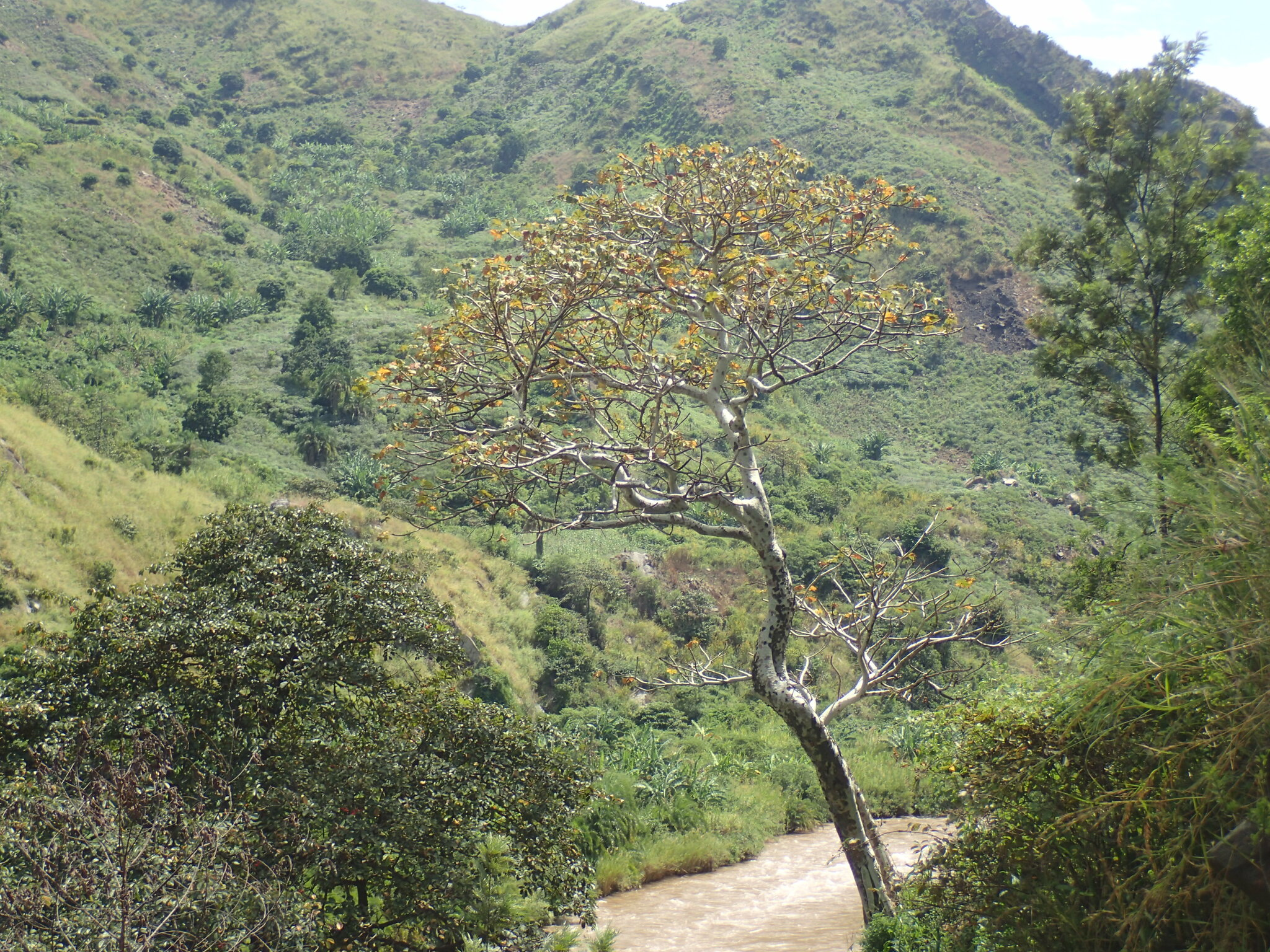
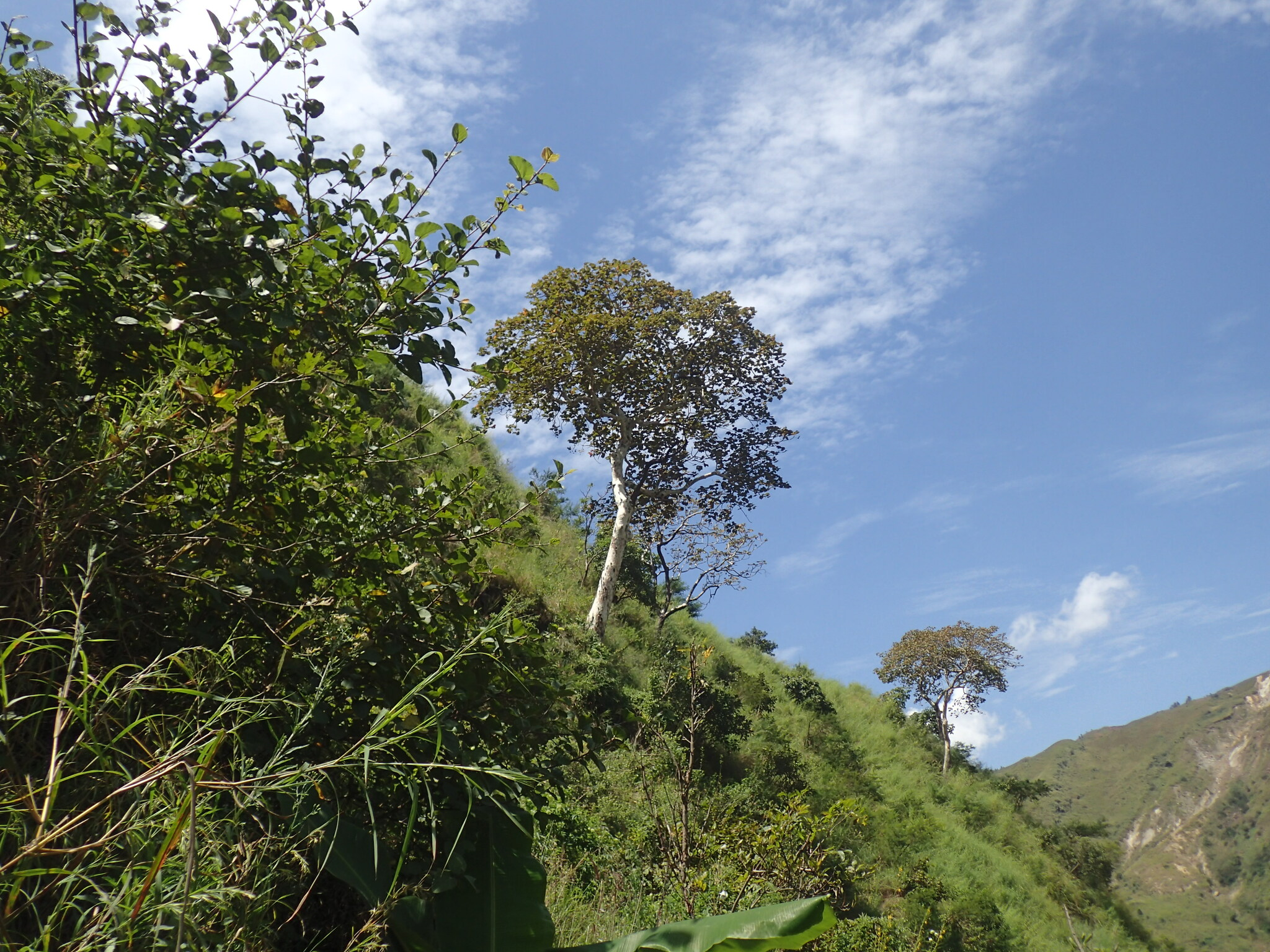
Large-leaved star-chestnut (Sterculia quinqueloba) in Ngweshe Chiefdom

The chiefdom is characterized by two main types of vegetation: natural and artificial. Natural vegetation can be found throughout the forests of Kaniola (Lushoze and Mugaba), Tubimbi, and Kabugi, alongside scattered grasslands. Artificial vegetation is represented by plantations and woodlands comprising eucalyptus, pine, grevilleas, cinchona, coffee, and tea trees. Notable plantations include those in Okra, Irabata, Muleke, Cibeke, Isingo, Nduba, and Muzinzi (Kaderhe, Nyangezi). A significant aspect of Ngweshe Chiefdom's environment is the deforestation of much of the mountain and hill areas, previously subjected to reforestation efforts during the Belgian colonial period. Regions such as the Businga hills (Nyangezi), Cibeke (Burhale), and the "Mise en garde" escarpment overlooking the Tubimbi Commercial Center have experienced severe erosion, leading to a loss of forest cover.

=== Climate ===
The Ngweshe Chiefdom experiences a humid subtropical climate with distinct dry and rainy seasons. The dry season is characterized by elevated temperatures and a limited amount of rainfall.

During this period, the weather tends to be hot and arid, with a scarcity of precipitation. The dry season provides favorable conditions for certain agricultural practices, particularly the cultivation of marshy areas. Farmers take advantage of the reduced water levels in these regions to engage in activities such as rice farming or other crops that thrive in drier conditions. The average annual temperature in Ngweshe falls within the range of 19 °C to 23 °C, providing a generally mild and comfortable climate throughout the year. However, during the dry season, temperatures can rise to higher levels, with occasional heatwaves that further contribute to the aridity of the region. In contrast to the dry season, Ngweshe experiences a significant amount of rainfall during the rainy season. This period is characterized by increased humidity and more frequent precipitation. The rains rejuvenate the landscape, replenishing the water sources, and nourishing the agricultural fields. The region's flora and fauna also thrive during this time, benefiting from the abundant moisture. The specifics of the rainy season, such as its duration and intensity, may vary from year to year.

=== Governance and administrative division ===
Ngweshe Chiefdom is officially recognized as a Decentralized Territorial Entity (Entité Territoriale Décentralisée, ETD) under the terms of the Constitution of the Democratic Republic of the Congo, adopted on 18 February 2006. The chiefdom is governed through a dual system that combines traditional authority with decentralized administrative structures. At the head of the chiefdom is the Mwami (customary chief), who holds both customary and statutory powers. The Mwami is appointed according to local traditions and is supported by three Chief Aldermen (Notables), who assist in the execution of administrative duties.

The territorial boundaries of the chiefdom are established by a decree of the Prime Minister, upon the recommendation of the Minister of Internal Affairs and with the approval of the Provincial Assembly. The administrative structure of the chiefdom comprises two main governing bodies: the Chiefdom Council and the Chiefdom Executive College.

- The Chiefdom Council serves as the chiefdom's deliberative body. Its members, known as Chiefdom Councillors, are elected by direct and secret universal suffrage in accordance with the national electoral law. Councillors are entitled to a fair remuneration that guarantees their independence and dignity. The council is led by an elected Bureau composed of a President, a vice-president, and a Rapporteur. The internal regulations of the Council provide guidelines for the election of its leadership, including measures to ensure gender representation where applicable.
- The Chiefdom Executive College is responsible for managing the affairs of the chiefdom and implementing the decisions made by the Chiefdom Council. It consists of the Mwami and three Aldermen appointed by him, selected on the basis of competence, credibility, and representativeness of the community. These appointments require the approval of the Chiefdom Council. Although the Mwami is not accountable to the council for his actions, none of his decisions are valid unless co-signed by an Alderman, who assumes full responsibility before the council. In the event of the Mwami's death, resignation, incapacity, or legal disqualification, the Aldermen collectively manage the chiefdom's affairs until a new Mwami is appointed. In cases of temporary absence or impediment, the presiding Alderman serves as interim leader.

Administratively, Ngweshe Chiefdom is subdivided into groupements (groupings), each led by a chef de groupement (grouping chief), who serves as the direct representative of the Mwami. These groupements are further divided into localités (villages), each governed by a chef de localité (village chief), also appointed according to customary practices. Both levels of local leadership play a central role in governance, conflict resolution, and the maintenance of customary law within their respective jurisdictions.

==== Groupements ====
As of 2018, the Ngweshe Chiefdom comprised 16 groupements (groupings):

- Burhale
- Ikoma
- Irongo
- Izege
- Kamanyola
- Kamisimbi
- Kanyola/Kaniola
- Karhongo
- Lubona
- Luchiga
- Lurhala
- Muchinga
- Mulamba
- Nduba
- Rubimbi
- Walungu

== History ==
The history of the Ngweshe Chiefdom is rooted in myth, genealogy, and evolving administrative recognition. According to oral tradition, the origins of the Ngweshe dynasty trace back to a legendary matriarch named Namuhoye, who is said to have given birth to eight children: Kabare, Narhana, Kalunzi, Naburhinyi, Lubobolo, Nnaninja, Kadusi-Ngombe, and Nyibunga — the only daughter among them. Although little is known about Namuhoye's personal history, her narrative is believed to be centered in the region that today corresponds to Mwenga Territory. From Luindi Chiefdom, her sons dispersed to establish various dynasties. The Bushi dynasty, from which the Ngweshe lineage ultimately descends, originated with the eldest son, Kabare. Tradition posits that it was Kabare's descendent who seceded and established the Ngweshe dynasty.

Genealogy of the Bami of Ngweshe Chiefdom

| Year | Name of the Mwami | Wife(s) | Children |
|---|---|---|---|
| | Kagweshe Bagweshe | M'Nakaya | Muhive, Bugabo and Nakwezi (girl) |
| 1697 | Muhive | M'Chokola, M'Niganda | Kwibuka |
| 1700 | Kwibuka | M'Mude, M'Chocha, M'Ntambirhi, M'Bahizi, M'Bushengwa | Kaserere, Birali, Kalangiro, Kayumpa, Muzuka, Chishanjaga, Mushengezi, and Nfumba |
| | Kaserere | M'Bushengwa, M'Ntambirhi | Weza, Lunjwire, Cibibi, Kirherero, Nchuranganya, Nshasi, Kahu, and Cishanjaga |
| 1740 | Weza Ler | M'Malibwe, M'Bugarha, and M'Wansinda | Bicinga, Muyangwa, Mwaga, Murhandikire, Miga, Mpango, Murhole, Ndeko, Bihinda, Cidurha-Mazi, Zagabe, Ntabana, and Nanzobe (F) |
| 1766 | Bicinga | M'Mugula, M'Nalwindi | Chirimwentale, Chizihira, Irenge, Bagweshe Barhahera, Maramuke (F), Nanzobe (F) |
| | Chirimwentale | In Chibangu, in Kahunzi- Kasigwa | M'Chibangu, M'Kahunzi-Kasigwa |
| | Chirhahongerwa | M'Naluganda, M'Nabushi Makombe Namwigamba, M'Baderha, M'Mugwa, M'Nyalembe, and M'Kahunza | Rugenge, Nyangezi Kasole Lukula, Masonga, Bingane, Ruhoya, Kasaza, Nkinzo, Rusengo, Lubarhuza, Chiherano Engombe, and Chiruzi |
| 1863–1887 | Rugenge | M'Musiwa, M'Nfizi, M'Bwanishi, M'Cishanjaga, and M'Munandi | Lushamba, Rubenga, Namukama, Machumu, Makungu, Murhesa, Mutijima, Muchiga, Mutuzi, Cirimwami, Nduru, and Kahwijima |
| Died in 1886 | Lushamba | M'Kasholero Nakaliza, M'MuyangwaI M'MuyangwaII M'Rugina, M'Chibogo, and M'Mutebuka | Lirangwe, Ntonde, Karhibula, Bizimana, Cinegena, Mulimba, Muliri, and Kalunga |
| 1888 | Lirangwe | M'Ciragira-Niganda Nakese, M'Bihinda, and Mugenye M'Ciroyi ca Mushengezi | Ruhongeka, Lulanga, Bahirwe, Muhyahya, Cirezi, and Namunene |
| 1891 | Ruhongeka Matabaro | M'Karholero Elisabeth, M'Ntogosa, M'Kasha, M'Cibibi, Njimbi M'Mutalemba, M'Chiraba, M'Nakalonge, M'Lukula lwa Kahu, and M'Rudahindwa | Mafundwe, Lwanwa, Kasigula, Rutega, Vuningoma, Charangoma, Kamwami, Bamanyirwe, Ntabikunzi, Ntangano, Chitunga, Chikalasha-Balagizi, Bashige, and Mushengezi |
| 1913–1937 | Mafundwe Weza II | M'Rudahindwa, M'Kasha, M'Namushiha, M'Muganga, and M'Nyampumba | Muhigirwa, Mutaga, Byumanine, Nvanamirihyo, Bachiganze, Kurhengamuzimu, and Lwambirhe |
| 1937 | Muhigirwa | M'Mugaruka Astride, M'Bugarha bwa Wasinda, M'Makungu, and M'Malekera | Ndatabaye Pierre, Bigirinama Herman, Mamimami, Nyakasane Juvenal, Namunyere Benedicta (F), Cizigire Philomène, Mbonwa Willermine, and Ntakwinja |
| 1933 | Ndatabaye Pierre Weza III born in 1930. | M'Bshizi Lusiko, M'Ndegesi, M'Rudahindwa, M'Katindigiri, and Elite | Mubalama Safari Claude, Patrick, Abraham, Mitima Erindangabo Kurhengamuzimu, Aganze Moise, Sara, Roxane Ayagirwe, Paola, Philomène Ashokole, Pamela, Annuciata, and Atukuzwe Naweza |

Source: This data comes from Alphonse Ntawigena Mwene Cishunjwa and is derived from a compilation of information provided by Paul Masson, Burume Lwigulira, and other oral sources.

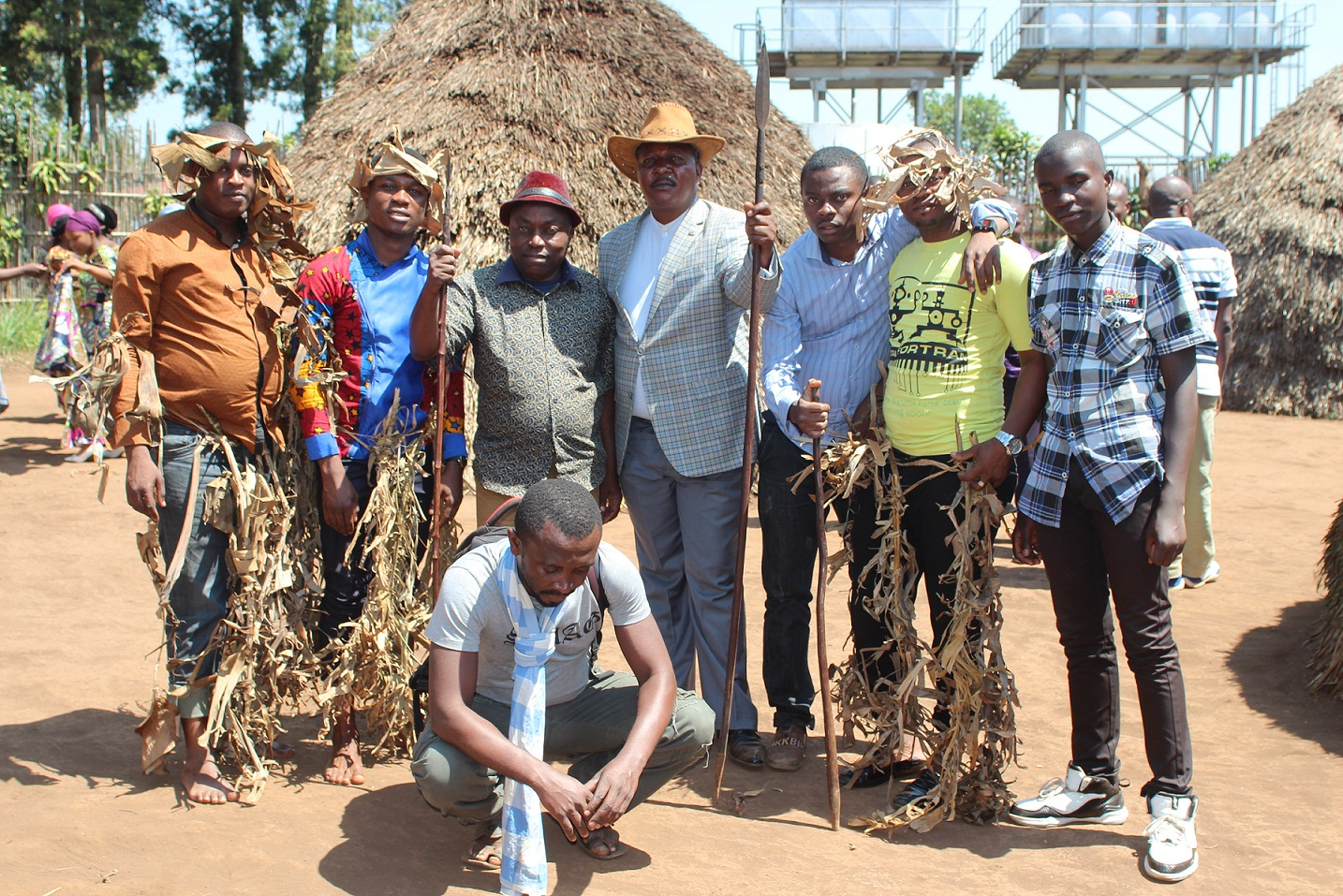
The Royal Court of Kabare Chiefdom, located in the neighboring Kabare Territory, is also under the chieftaincy of the Bashi, who predominantly reside there

The genealogical structure of the Ngweshe Chiefdom is characterized by polygyny, with each mwami reportedly marrying an average of five wives. Royal genealogy follows a patrilineal system, in which male descendants are documented while female descendants are often omitted. For instance, among approximately 106 children recorded across fifteen royal generations, only 14 were female, and this exclusion aligns with a Hebraic-style lineage archetype that emphasized male primacy in matters of inheritance, familial legacy, and royal authority. This gender asymmetry, historically pervasive throughout the chiefdom, engendered ramifications for women's societal status, inheritance prerogatives, and socioeconomic development, but substantial advancements have been realized in recent decades, as daughters may inherit from their parents, especially when no male heirs are present, a shift from earlier practices in which daughters from sonless households were often sent to the royal court as attendants following their father's death. The progressive evolution of women's roles within the chiefdom is closely linked to increased exposure to Western social frameworks, particularly through Christian missionary activity and formal education, which have actively challenged traditional gender norms and contributed to shifts in family dynamics and attitudes toward women and daughters.

The formal administrative recognition of Ngweshe Chiefdom by the colonial government began with Decision No. 54, issued on 20 October 1920 by District Commissioner Beau de Ghiuste, which was subsequently fortified by an additional decree dated 23 September 1944, under the jurisdiction of District Commissioner Ryck. The chiefdom's status was later revalidated in the post-independence era through Ordinance-Law No. 82-006 of 25 February 1982, which defined the chiefdom as a "generally homogeneous group of traditional communities organized on the basis of custom and headed by a traditional chief invested by public authorities". This legal framework formally integrated Ngweshe Chiefdom into the administrative structure of the Republic of Zaire, and it continued under subsequent Congolese governments. Presently, the chiefdom functions as a recognized Decentralized Territorial Entity (Entité Territoriale Décentralisée, ETD), as instituted by the 2006 Constitution of the Democratic Republic of the Congo.

=== Armed conflict and humanitarian crisis ===
==== First Congo War ====
Ngweshe Chiefdom has endured persistent armed conflict, militia activity, and intercommunal violence for over three decades with this prolonged instability resulting in extensive human rights violations, large-scale displacement of civilians, and widespread insecurity. The region was a significant theater during the First Congo War (1996–1997), a conflict rooted in the aftermath of the 1994 Rwandan genocide. Following the genocide, the Rwandan Patriotic Front (RPF), led by Paul Kagame, seized control of Rwanda, overthrowing the regime of Juvénal Habyarimana. However, the RPF was accused of committing mass killings against Hutu civilians. A report by Robert Gersony, a consultant for the United Nations High Commissioner for Refugees (UNHCR), indicated that RPF forces may have executed between 5,000 and 10,000 Hutus per month during the spring and summer of 1994. According to these reports, the killings often followed a disturbing pattern in which civilians were assembled under the pretense of attending "peace and reconciliation meetings" and were subsequently executed.

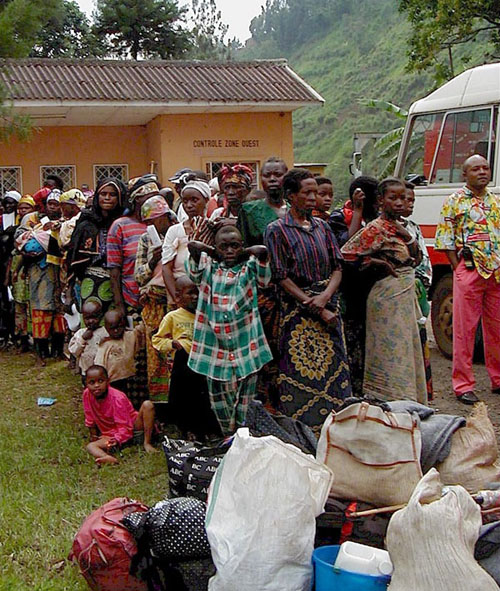
Rape victims who have been successfully reintegrated into their communities assemble in a "peace hut" near Walungu Territory

In the immediate aftermath of the genocide, over two million Rwandan Hutus—including civilians and Interahamwe militia members—fled into eastern Zaire (now the DRC), especially into North and South Kivu. During this period, the Zairean state under President Mobutu Sese Seko had significantly weakened, rendering it unable to effectively control its eastern territories. As tensions rose in early 1996, the Rwandan Patriotic Army (RPA), Ugandan forces, and the Burundian Armed Forces (Forces Armées Burundaises, FAB) provided support to Banyamulenge and other Tutsi-aligned armed groups. In South Kivu, UNHCR estimated that approximately 307,499 refugees were housed in 26 camps spread across Walungu, Kabare, and Kalehe Territories—collectively referred to as the "Bukavu camps". These camps included Kamanyola, Izirangabo, Karabangira, Nyangezi (Mulwa), Nyantende, Muku, and Mushweshwe south of Bukavu; Bideka, Chimanga (Burhale), Bulonge (not recognized by UNHCR), Nyamirangwe, and Chabarhabe to the west; Panzi, Nyakavogo, Mudaka/Murhala, INERA, ADI-Kivu, Kashusha, Katana, Kalehe, and Kabira to the north; and Chondo, Chayo, Bugarula, Maugwere, and Karama on Idjwi Island. As troops from the Alliance of Democratic Forces for the Liberation of Congo-Zaire (AFDL) and the Rwandan Patriotic Army advanced toward Bukavu, they destroyed many of the makeshift camps established by genocide survivors, particularly in the Ruzizi Plain (Uvira Territory) and west of Bukavu. Upon leaving Nyantende village, AFDL-RPA forces split into two columns: one advancing toward Bukavu via Buhanga, Mushweshwe, Comuhini, Chabarhabe, Ciriri, and Lwakabirhi; the other moving toward Walungu-Centre through Muku, Cidaho, and Cidodobo.

On 20 October 1996, AFDL-RPA units launched an attack on the Kamanyola refugee camp from Bwegera and the Rwandan town of Bugarama. An unknown number of refugees and local civilians were killed, with some victims' bodies disposed of in latrines. The following day, on 21 October, additional killings occurred in Nyarubale in the Kalunga hills, approximately two kilometers from Kamanyola. Refugees attempting to flee to Bukavu were intercepted at checkpoints and targeted based on their accents when responding to greetings in Swahili. Those identified as Rwandan or Burundian were summarily executed. On 22 October, in anticipation of the advancing forces, refugees from the Nyangezi and Nyantende camps fled north toward Bukavu. Between 26 and 28 October, AFDL-RPA units launched coordinated attacks on the camps located to the south and west of the city. Although many camps had already been evacuated, large numbers of refugees had regrouped at other locations, including the Kashusha, INERA, ADI-Kivu, and Chimanga camps. On 26 October, AFDL-RPA forces set fire to the Muku camp, located approximately ten kilometers from Bukavu. That same day, hundreds of refugees fleeing along roads from Nyantende to Bukavu and Walungu-Centre were intercepted and killed. Witnesses reported that victims, many of whom were women, children, and the elderly, were shot, stabbed with bayonets, or killed by shrapnel. An estimated 200 to 600 people were killed in these incidents. On 28 October, five additional refugees were killed in the village of Lwakabiri, thirty kilometers west of Bukavu.

After the capture of Bukavu on 29 October, AFDL-RPA units continued their operations against refugee concentrations in the north. On 2 November, they attacked the Kashusha/INERA camp in Kabare Territory using heavy weaponry, resulting in the deaths of hundreds of refugees. During this assault, AFDL-RPA forces reportedly opened fire indiscriminately on the Forces Armées Zaïroises (FAZ), ex-FAR/Interahamwe fighters, and civilian refugees. The Zairean security contingent assigned to the camp (Contingent Zaïrois pour la Sécurité des Camps, CZSC) fled, followed by a portion of the refugee population. Around 22 November, AFDL-RPA forces entered the Chimanga camp, approximately 71 kilometers west of Bukavu. Upon arrival, soldiers instructed the refugees to gather for a meeting, promising food and safe return to Rwanda. The refugees were organized by their region of origin, but a prearranged signal triggered a coordinated assault. Soldiers encircling the camp opened fire on the assembled population, killing an estimated 500 to 800 people. In January 1997, AFDL-RPA units conducted a combing operation along the Bukavu–Walungu road. Approximately sixteen kilometers from Bukavu, they arrested and killed at least 30 Rwandan and Burundian refugees, using knives in most cases. Reports indicate that the victims were often subjected to torture and mutilation prior to being executed.

==== Second Congo War ====
The eruption of the Second Congo War in 1998 further destabilized the chiefdom, compounding the insecurity that had taken root during the First Congo War. The conflict originated from the deteriorating alliance between President Laurent-Désiré Kabila and his former Rwandan and Ugandan backers, who had supported his rise to power in 1997. Once in office, Kabila faced accusations of marginalizing Tutsi factions within his government while favoring allies from his native Katanga region. Allegations also emerged that the United States had provided military assistance to Rwanda before the war, purportedly to secure access to the Democratic Republic of the Congo's vast natural resources. In this context, the U.S. Army deployed a Rwanda Interagency Assessment Team (RIAT) in July 1998 to provide training to Rwandan forces. Investigative reports by journalist Keith Harmon Snow implicated American actors, including Roger Winter of the U.S. Committee for Refugees and Immigrants, in supporting anti-Kabila insurgencies.

Tensions escalated significantly in July 1998 when President Kabila, fearing a coup d'état, dismissed Rwandan General James Kabarebe as Chief of Staff of the Congolese army and ordered the withdrawal of all RPA personnel from Congolese territory. This move provoked swift retaliation. Rwanda and Uganda responded by supporting the formation of a new rebel coalition, the Rassemblement Congolais pour la Démocratie (RCD), which launched a rebellion on 2 August 1998. The uprising was announced via the state broadcaster in Goma by Congolese troops allied with the RPA, the Ugandan People's Defence Force (UPDF), the FAB, and remnants of the former Zairean army (ex-FAZ). In a matter of weeks, the RCD and its allies had seized control of key towns in North and South Kivu, Orientale Province, and northern Katanga, and advanced into Équateur Province. However, the rebel advance into Bas-Congo (now Kongo Central), and Kinshasa was repelled due to the intervention of Angolan and Zimbabwean forces backing Kabila. The conflict led to the de facto division of the country. One zone remained under Kabila's government, supported by the Zimbabwe Defence Forces (ZDF), the Angolan Armed Forces (FAA), the Namibia Defence Force (NDF), the Chadian National Army (ANT), and Sudan. The opposing zone was dominated by the RCD's armed wing, the Armée Nationale Congolaise (ANC), supported by the RPA, UPDF, and FAB. The war's complexity increased as Kabila established alliances with Mayi-Mayi militias, the Burundian Hutu rebel group Forces pour la Défense de la Démocratie (FDD), and Hutu armed factions including the ex-FAR and Interahamwe, later reorganized as the Armée de Libération du Rwanda (ALiR), to counter RCD and Rwandan influence in the eastern provinces. Uganda, meanwhile, supported the creation of the Mouvement pour la Libération du Congo (MLC), led by Jean-Pierre Bemba, to administer territories it had seized in Équateur Province. Internal divisions within the RCD emerged in March 1999 due to strategic disagreements between Rwanda and Uganda, resulting in the formation of two rival factions: RCD-Goma, aligned with Rwanda, and RCD-Mouvement de Libération (RCD-ML), backed by Uganda.

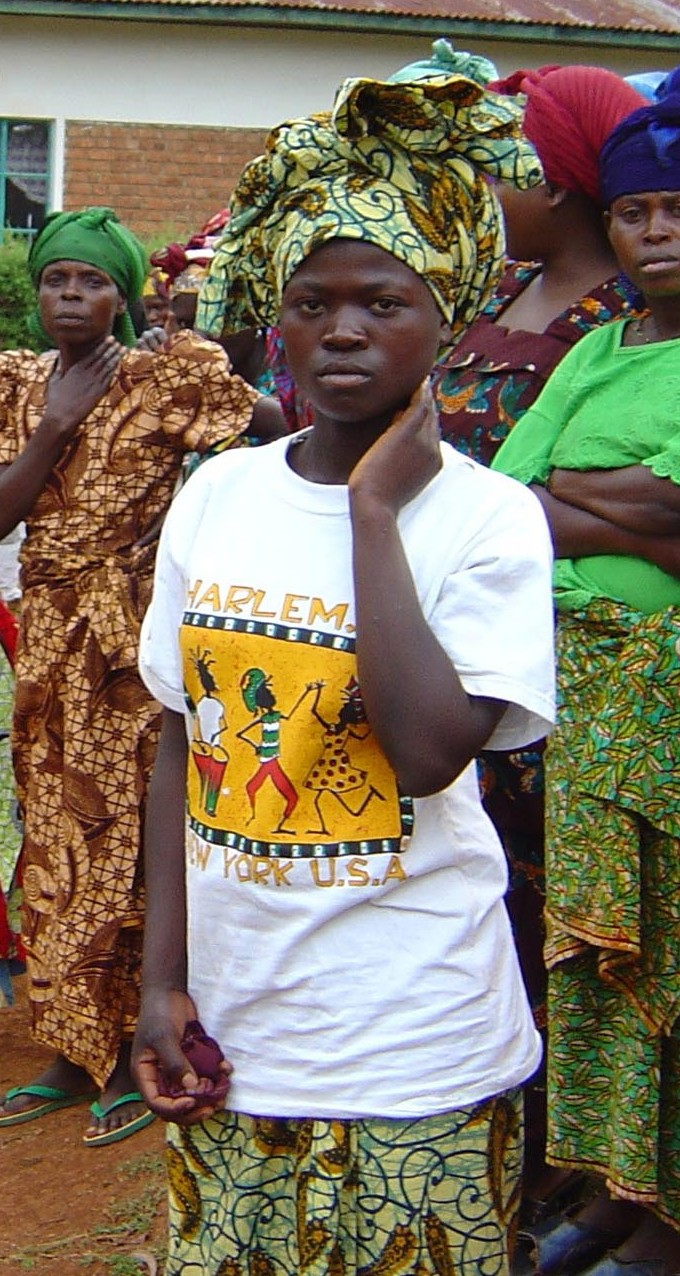
Rape survivor near Walungu Territory

In South Kivu, RCD-Goma's military wing, the ANC, quickly occupied major urban centers with assistance from the RPA and FAB. However, these forces encountered sustained resistance in rural areas, particularly from Mayi-Mayi militias. The RCD's association with Tutsi and Banyamulenge communities, coupled with its dependence on foreign military support and its troops' involvement in violent abuses, alienated much of the local population. As a result, numerous local youths joined Mayi-Mayi groups or helped establish new militias, including Mudundu 40 in Walungu Territory. Some of these groups allied with ALiR, ex-FAR/Interahamwe fighters, and the Burundian Hutu rebel movement CNDD-FDD. While certain Mayi-Mayi factions—such as General Padiri's forces in Bunyakiri and Colonel Dunia's Forces d'Autodéfense Populaires (FAP) in Shabunda Territory—received arms and logistical support from the Kabila government, the majority operated autonomously. In retaliation for persistent Mayi-Mayi resistance, ANC, RPA, and FAB troops launched aggressive counterinsurgency operations. These operations were marked by widespread human rights abuses, including systematic sexual violence, mass killings, and the targeting of civilian populations.

On 3 August 1998, Banyamulenge rebels and elements of the RPA executed at least 38 Force Aérienne Congolaise (FAC) officers and approximately 100 FAC soldiers at Kavumu Airport, north of Bukavu. The victims, who had resisted the initial outbreak of the rebellion, were captured following the arrival of RPA reinforcements. After being disarmed, they were ordered to lie on the runway before being executed. According to reports, the attackers forced Kadogo (child soldiers) within the captured ranks to carry out the killings. In the same month, ANC-RPA forces conducted two operations—referred to as Musako—in Bukavu, targeting alleged arms caches. During these operations, an unknown number of civilians were killed or subjected to sexual violence, with most of the documented rapes occurring in the Kadutu and Ibanda communes. Between 28 December 1998 and 5 January 1999, clashes between ANC-RPA forces and a coalition of FAC, ALiR, and Mayi-Mayi fighters led to civilian casualties in the villages of Mubumbano, Mudirhi, and Ntondo/Mubumbano, located in Walungu Territory. On 12 January 1999, ANC-RPA units reportedly killed several civilians along the road connecting Burhale to Mushinga-Lubona.

==== Post-assassination developments and continued conflict in South Kivu ====
The assassination of President Laurent-Désiré Kabila on 16 January 2001 signaled a significant turning point in the DRC's turbulent history, with Joseph Kabila stepping in to lead a peace-oriented phase. Efforts toward peace began with preliminary steps for military disengagement and the convening of the Inter-Congolese Dialogue (ICD). Beginning in March 2001, the United Nations Organization Mission in the Democratic Republic of the Congo (MONUC) deployed military observers along the frontlines to support the ceasefire process. However, hostilities persisted in the eastern provinces, particularly in North and South Kivu, where Mayi-Mayi militias, the FDD, and the ALiR continued to engage in armed conflict against the RCD-Goma's armed wing, the ANC, supported by RPA forces. In an attempt to solidify its influence in South Kivu and weaken the Democratic Forces for the Liberation of Rwanda (FDLR), RCD-Goma organized an inter-Kivu dialogue in September 2001. During this forum, it offered separate peace agreements to local Mayi-Mayi factions. However, most of these groups, encouraged by the Kinshasa government, rejected the initiative. Only the Mudundu 40 militia entered into negotiations. The dialogue was also boycotted by numerous civil society organizations, undermining its legitimacy.

Despite these peace efforts, violence continued into 2002. ANC and RPA forces were implicated in massacres, including one in the village of Kaboke II in Fizi Territory, where between 17 and 20 civilians—among them a baby and two minors—were killed. Some were shot upon return to the village, others while hiding in the bush, and several were burned alive when their homes were set on fire. In the same period, a rebellion broke out within the Banyamulenge community in Minembwe, led by former ANC commander Patrick Masunzu. His rebel group, the Forces Républicaines et Fédéralistes (FRF), allied with Mayi-Mayi forces in Mwenga, Uvira, and Fizi Territories. With backing from the central government in Kinshasa, they launched coordinated attacks on ANC and RPA positions. Amid this turmoil, the Inter-Congolese Dialogue officially began on 25 February 2002 in Sun City, South Africa. On 19 April 2002, Joseph Kabila and Jean-Pierre Bemba announced a framework agreement for power-sharing. Although the accord received broad support, RCD-Goma and certain unarmed opposition parties, including the Union for Democracy and Social Progress (UDPS), refused to endorse it. On 30 July 2002, the DRC and Rwanda signed the Pretoria Accord, committing to the withdrawal of Rwandan forces from Congolese territory in exchange for the disbandment of Hutu militias, including ex-FAR/Interahamwe elements within the FDLR. A similar agreement was reached with Uganda in Luanda on 6 September 2002, leading to the withdrawal of Ugandan troops and efforts to stabilize the volatile Ituri Province. By September, the military disengagement of forces from Rwanda, Uganda, Zimbabwe, Angola, and Namibia had begun.

As Rwandan Defence Force (RDF) withdrew, Mayi-Mayi and FDLR elements reasserted control over various areas of South Kivu. In response, the ANC and RDF launched counter-offensives to reclaim lost territory. Under significant international pressure, the various Congolese factions signed the Global and All-Inclusive Agreement in Pretoria on 17 December 2002. This accord paved the way for the integration of armed factions into a unified national army and the creation of transitional governing institutions. Simultaneously, negotiations were held between RCD-Goma and the political wing of Mudundu 40, led by Odilon Kurhenga Muzimu and Patient Mwendanga. The objective was to facilitate the withdrawal of Rwandan troops from Walungu Territory in exchange for political cooperation and the dismantling of Mudundu 40's military wing, commanded by Albert Kahasha (alias Foka Mike). However, despite Mwendanga's appointment as Governor of South Kivu in December 2002, the military wing—reinforced by Padiri Mayi-Mayi forces—refused to disband and instead solidified its positions in the Burhale groupement. The failure of this rapprochement led to Mwendanga's dismissal in March 2003, followed by an ANC-RDF offensive against Mudundu 40 forces in Walungu Territory. Despite ongoing military confrontations in North and South Kivu, increasing insecurity in North Katanga, and militia violence in Ituri, the Inter-Congolese Dialogue concluded with the ratification of the Global and All-Inclusive Agreement in Sun City on 1 April 2003. A supplementary memorandum detailed the integration of various armed groups into a new national army. Transition institutions were formally established on 30 June 2003.

Between 5 and 13 April 2003, ANC and RDF forces launched a major offensive on Mudundu 40 headquarters in Mushinga, targeting the villages of Mwegerera, Lukumbo, Karhundu, and Izirangabo. These operations resulted in several civilian deaths, the rape of at least 27 women, and the disappearance of six individuals. Villages were systematically looted, and mass graves were later identified in Izirangabo, Butunza, and Kibirira. In retaliation for perceived local support for Mudundu 40, ANC forces deliberately destroyed schools and health centers in southern Walungu Territory. Despite the official conclusion of the war, South Kivu remained plagued by violence. Armed groups continued to operate from the high plateaus and eastern hills, obstructing efforts to establish lasting peace and security in the region.

== Economy ==
=== Agriculture ===
Ngweshe Chiefdom's economy is primarily based on agriculture, livestock farming, trade, and small-scale mining. Agriculture constitutes the backbone of the local economy, encompassing both subsistence and industrial practices. Subsistence farming dominates rural livelihoods, with key crops including bananas, cassava, sweet potatoes, beans, maize, sorghum, yams, peas, soybeans, sugarcane, peanuts, and various vegetables. Market gardening, particularly in marshy areas, supplements household food supplies. Tubimbi groupement was historically known for cassava exports to Bukavu, although production has since declined, leading to a cessation of exports.

Associations in Ngweshe Chiefdom by Groupement

| No. | Groupement | No. | Field of activity |
|---|---|---|---|
| 1. | Burhale | 22 | Agriculture, rural hydraulics, and depathologization cooperatives |
| 2. | Ikoma | 54 | Grouped into two collectives: Nyamugo and Mparanyi |
| 3. | Irongo | 16 | Agriculture, literacy, and livestock farming |
| 4. | Izege | 6 | Agriculture and anti-erosion control |
| 5. | Kamisimbi | 19 | Market gardening and livestock farming |
| 6. | Karhongo (Nyangezi) | 14 | Reforestation, agropastoral, training in cultivation techniques, and brickmaking |
| 7. | Kaniola | 7 | Crafts, agriculture, and livestock breeding |
| 8. | Lubona | 11 | Agriculture, livestock, brickworks, and housing |
| 9. | Luchiga | 6 | Agriculture, drainage, habitat, and animation |
| 10. | Mulamba | 10 | Forge, household appliance repairs, and agropastoral |
| 11 | Mushinga | 14 | Agropastoral and literacy |
| 12 | Nduba | 10 | Agropastoral, brickyard, and mutual aid |
| 13 | Tubimbi | 2 | Agropastoral |
| 14 | Walungu | 18 | Agropastoral, housing, and household promotion |
| 15 | Kamanyola | 13 | Agropastoral and transport |
| 16 | Lurhala | 9 | Agropastoral and crafts |
| Total | | 239 | |

Source: Ngweshe Chiefdom Development Office, January 2011.

Due to increasing population pressure, arable land has become scarce, prompting farmers to cultivate marshlands, which are typically under the customary authority of local chiefs or the mwami.

Marshes exploited by Ngweshe Chiefdom's peasants

| No. | Marsh | Groupement or village | Area in hectares | Number of operators | Average area exploited per person (in ares). |
|---|---|---|---|---|---|
| 1. | Nyalugana | Ciherano/Lurhala | 914 | 5,877 | 15 |
| 2. | Nyamubanda | Karhongo | 1,050 | 4,322 | 24 |
| 3. | Chisheke | Walungu | 496 | 2,316 | 21 |
| 4. | Cidorho | Burhale/Mulamba | 1,276.7 | 2,167 | 58 |
| 5. | Kanyantende | Karhongo | 555 | 1,750 | 28 |
| 6. | Mirhumba | Mulamba | 162 | 816 | 12 |
| 7. | Cibabo | Nyangezi | 5 | 500 | 1 |
| 8. | Kalangve | Mulamba/Burhale | 2 | 168 | 1 |
| 9. | Nyabunkungu | Nduba | 3.5 | 115 | 3 |
| 10 | Ishakishe | Ibona/Izege | 14 | 121 | 11 |
| 11 | Kamirandaku | Mulamba | 7.8 | 71 | 10 |
| 12 | Misheke | Mulamba | 6 | 52 | 11 |
| 13 | Bunkungu | Lurhala/Boya | 5 | 43 | 11 |
| 14 | Chihando | Mulamba | 5 | 43 | 11 |
| 15 | Kabosa | Mulamba | 5 | 38 | 13 |
| 16 | Kashenge | Burhale | 3.5 | 34 | 10 |
| 17 | Chama | Ibona/Izege | 2 | 22 | 9 |
| 18 | Cigogo | Kaniola | 2 | 19 | 10 |
| 19 | Nakanywera | Burhale | 2 | 15 | 13 |
| 20 | Buliri | Mulamba | 1.5 | 14 | 10 |
| | Total | 20 | 4,518 | 18,701 | 24 |

Source: Report of the Bushi Inter-Marsh Committee (Comité inter marais du Bushi) in 2010.

These marshes cover approximately 4,518 hectares and support around 18,701 people, each cultivating an average of 24 ares.

Industrial agriculture is concentrated on tea, cinchona, and timber cultivation. Active companies in this sector include Pharmakina, Irabata, Plantations Gombo, and Cibeke, with local individuals also participating in the cultivation of these crops, placing a notable emphasis on cinchona.

==== Environmental challenges and loss of plantations and Its ripple effects ====
Ngweshe Chiefdom has faced dramatic deforestation and soil deterioration, which can be partially linked to colonial practices that prioritized large-scale plantation agriculture over the subsistence farming of the indigenous population. Under Belgian rule, vast tracts of land were allocated to foreign settlers to cultivate cash crops such as quinine and tea, which undermined local agricultural practices. This focus on monoculture, alongside a lack of crop rotation and fallow periods, has led to a significant decline in soil fertility. The challenges in agriculture have been compounded by crop diseases, such as cassava mosaic disease, which have severely impacted the production of staple foods like cassava, beans, and bananas. This agricultural crisis has contributed to rising poverty levels, making it difficult for families to sustain their livelihoods. As a result, many children are forced to abandon education due to financial constraints, leading to a cascade of social issues, including increased street crime, prostitution, and migration of youth to urban areas such as Bukavu.

The decline of agriculture is symptomatic of broader economic deterioration. Only the Pharmakina and Gombo plantations show remnants of the plantation economy. The collapse of local plantations like Kinaplant, Irabata, the Commission Agricole du Kivu, Gombo, Bukina, Cinomyo, Kashongero, Sengiyunva, Cibeke, and others has led to widespread unemployment, particularly affecting young men and women who used to find work in areas ranging from planting to agricultural product processing. The absence of these enterprises has stripped the chiefdom of essential economic opportunities. As plantations vanished, local resources became scarce. Formerly abundant eucalyptus and cinchona trees, once utilized for construction materials, have also disappeared.

=== Livestock farming, commerce and mining ===
Cattle, regarded as a symbol of prestige, dominate the livestock sector. Other domesticated animals include goats, sheep, pigs, rabbits, guinea pigs, chickens, ducks, and pigeons, which contribute to both food security and local trade.

In response to land scarcity and limited agricultural output, many residents have turned to small-scale commerce. Informal vending has given rise to local shopping centers and periodic markets throughout the chiefdom. Prominent commercial hubs include Walungu, Burhuza, Mugogo, Kamanyola, Munya/Nyangezi, Mashango/Burhale, Tubimbi, Madaka/Mushinga, Kaniola, and Nzibira/Kaniola. Additionally, weekly markets operate across all groupements, facilitating the exchange of agricultural goods and household items. Trade extends beyond internal markets to neighboring territories and urban centers, particularly the city of Bukavu. There are also commercial exchanges with mining-rich areas in Mwenga Territory and Shabunda Territory, where the Bashi supply essential goods.

The subsoil of Ngweshe Chiefdom is rich in mineral resources, including gold (notably in Mulamba, Mushinga, Kaniola, and Tubimbi groupements), cassiterite, iron, and other unexploited minerals. During and after Belgian colonization, the Société Minière et Industrielle du Kivu (Sominki) exploited minerals in the chiefdom, with a major operational base formerly located in Luntukulu, Mulamba. Mining activities continue to influence local livelihoods. An estimated 40% of young men from the chiefdom migrate to Mwenga Territory and Shabunda Territory in search of gold, coltan, and cassiterite, often leaving their families for extended periods. These migratory patterns have also fostered cultural assimilation between the Bashi of Ngweshe Chiefdom and the Barega populations of the mining regions.

== Demographics ==
=== Population ===
Ngweshe Chiefdom is predominantly inhabited by Bashi, who constitute the chiefdom's main ethnic group. However, there is some ethnic diversity within its boundaries. In the groupements of Mulamba and Tubimbi, small hamlets are inhabited by the Barega, while in Kamanyola groupement, pockets of Bafuliiru and Bavira communities are also present. Linguistically, the area is rich and varied: Mashi is the most commonly spoken local language, while French serves as the official language used in administration and education. Kiswahili functions as a national lingua franca and is widely spoken in both formal and informal settings.

According to a 2011 official census, Ngweshe Chiefdom had a population of 601,306 people.

Population Distribution by Groupement and Social Categories as of 31 December 2011

| No. | Groupement | Men | Women | Boys | Girls | Total |
|---|---|---|---|---|---|---|
| 1. | Lurhala | 14,088 | 16,261 | 21,297 | 22,173 | 73,819 |
| 2. | Kaniola | 9,079 | 11,744 | 16,840 | 19,054 | 56,717 |
| 3. | Karhongo | 8,573 | 10,367 | 14,208 | 16,219 | 49,367 |
| 4. | Walungu | 8,175 | 10,398 | 13,658 | 16,878 | 49,109 |
| 5. | Kamanyola | 8,390 | 10,564 | 13,690 | 14,133 | 46,777 |
| 6. | Burhale | 7,659 | 10,746 | 12,057 | 12,094 | 42,556 |
| 7. | Kamisimbi | 6,334 | 7,829 | 11,342 | 11,756 | 37,261 |
| 8. | Mulamba | 7,464 | 8,768 | 10,299 | 10,438 | 36,969 |
| 9. | Ikoma | 6,749 | 8,415 | 10,291 | 11,117 | 36,572 |
| 10. | Izege | 4,199 | 5,011 | 9,890 | 9,985 | 29,085 |
| 11. | Luchiga | 5,634 | 6,155 | 10,362 | 6,635 | 28,786 |
| 12. | Irongo | 5,010 | 5,525 | 7,591 | 7,830 | 25,956 |
| 13. | Mushinga | 4,469 | 6,188 | 7,251 | 7,504 | 25,412 |
| 14. | Nduba | 4 110 | 4,963 | 7,263 | 7,150 | 23,486 |
| 15. | Tubimbi | 4,779 | 5,579 | 5,609 | 5,981 | 21,948 |
| 16. | Lubona | 3,079 | 3,558 | 5,343 | 5,506 | 17,486 |
| | Total | 107,791 | 132,071 | 176,991 | 184,453 | 601,306 |

Source: Fourth Quarter 2011 Report of the Civil Registry of the Ngweshe Chiefdom.

The most populated groupement at the time was Lurhala, with 73,819 inhabitants, while Lubona had the smallest population, totaling 17,486. By 2018, the territory's annual report estimated the population had grown to 672,436.

The population structure of Ngweshe is notably youthful. The 2011 census indicated that individuals aged 0–19 years accounted for 393,852 people, while those aged 65 and above numbered 27,278. Together, these age groups comprised 70% of the population, classified as the dependent population. The active population, defined as those between 20 and 64 years old, represented only 30% of the total, or 180,176 people. However, the actual proportion of economically active individuals is likely lower due to the inclusion of the sick, elderly, or otherwise inactive within this demographic.

=== Religion ===
Ngweshe Chiefdom, like much of Walungu Territory, has been heavily influenced by Christianity. Catholic evangelization began in 1906 in Nyangezi, with the arrival of Belgian missionaries. They established South Kivu's first Catholic parish in Nyangezi, followed by another in Burhale in 1921. The early missionaries sought to eliminate animist beliefs and practices, replacing traditional religions with Christian doctrine. This included the suppression of rites and myths associated with Lyangombe, a deity venerated across Bushi, Rwanda, and Burundi. The spread of Christianity led to significant cultural transformation. Traditional names and beliefs were replaced by Christian teachings, often delivered in Romance languages such as French—languages unfamiliar to the local population. Despite the de-acculturation that accompanied these changes, many in the region ultimately viewed the impact of Christian missions positively, particularly due to the rise of local leadership shaped by religious institutions. More than 90% of the population are affiliated with Christian denominations, including Catholicism, Protestantism, and Kimbanguism. These religious bodies also operate numerous schools, hospitals, clinics, and charitable organizations throughout the chiefdom.

Islam was introduced to the chiefdom more recently, during the United Nations Mission in the Democratic Republic of Congo (MONUC). Pakistani and Egyptian peacekeepers converted several Bamushi to Islam and established mosques in Walungu, Burhale, and Mushinga groupements. Although still a minority faith, Islam has established a presence in the chiefdom through these initiatives.

=== Education ===
Formal education was introduced during the colonial era, beginning shortly after 1906. That year marked the arrival of the first Belgian Catholic missionaries in Cibimbi, a locality situated within the Nyangezi/Karhongo groupement. These missionaries established the region's first Catholic parish and soon after, its first primary school. This initiative laid the foundation for a network of parish-based chapel-schools that gradually expanded to other parts of the chiefdom. The growth of educational infrastructure has continued beyond the colonial period, supported by the Congolese state, various Christian denominations (notably Catholic and Protestant), and private actors.

Distribution of nursery, primary, secondary, and higher education schools by groupement

| No. | Groupement | No. of nursery schools | No. of primary schools | No. of secondary schools | No. of higher Institutes |
|---|---|---|---|---|---|
| 1. | Burhale | 4 | 14 | 8 | 1 |
| 2. | Ikoma | 6 | 12 | 4 | 0 |
| 3. | Irongo | 0 | 13 | 4 | 0 |
| 4. | Izege | 0 | 5 | 2 | 0 |
| 5. | Kamanyola | 1 | 7 | 8 | 2 |
| 6. | Kamisimbi | 3 | 13 | 3 | 1 |
| 7. | Kaniola | 0 | 11 | 2 | 0 |
| 8. | Karhongo | 2 | 39 | 14 | 2 |
| 9. | Lubona | 1 | 11 | 1 | 0 |
| 10. | Luchiga | 0 | 4 | 2 | 0 |
| 11. | Lurhala | 4 | 32 | 9 | 0 |
| 12. | Mulamba | 0 | 11 | 2 | 0 |
| 13. | Mushinga | 0 | 10 | 6 | 1 |
| 14. | Nduba | 3 | 06 | 4 | 0 |
| 15. | Tubimbi | 0 | 5 | 2 | 0 |
| 16. | Walungu | 2 | 13 | 7 | 3 |
| | Totals | 26 | 206 | 78 | 10 |

Source: Ngweshe Chiefdom Local Development Plan 2010–2014.

Despite this historical trajectory, educational infrastructure remains insufficient relative to the population's needs. According to the Ngweshe Chiefdom Local Development Plan 2010–2014, the 5–14 age group—representative of the primary school demographic—comprised 199,902 people. These students were served by 206 primary schools, translating to an average of approximately 970 students per school. Given that most schools have only six classrooms, class sizes average 162 students, indicating severe overcrowding.

Higher education in Ngweshe Chiefdom in 2011

| No. | Installation groupement | Higher Institute | School enrollment |
|---|---|---|---|
| 1. | Burhale | Institut Supérieur de Techniques Appliquées de Bukavu à Burhuza | 50 |
| 2. | Luchiga | Institut Supérieur Pédagogique de Walungu | 60 |
| 3. | Karhongo (Nyangezi) | Propedeutic/Grand seminary/Murhesa; Institut Supérieur des Techniques Médicales de Nyangezi | 170 52 |
| 4. | Walungu | Institut Supérieur Pédagogique de Walungu; ISTCE; Institut Superieur des Techniques Medicales de Kanyamulande | 140 120 80 |
| | Total | 7 | 672 |

Source: Ngweshe Chiefdom Local Development Plan 2010–2014.

Secondary education is similarly underdeveloped, and higher education remains in a nascent stage. The chiefdom is home to seven higher education institutions, all of which operate in rudimentary conditions. Among them, only the propaedeutic program at the Chibimbi/Nyangezi Major Seminary possesses relatively adequate infrastructure. The remaining institutions lack essential facilities such as libraries and laboratories and depend largely on underqualified teaching staff—primarily bachelor's degree holders. With a total student population of 672, higher education in Ngweshe Chiefdom is still far from fulfilling local human resource development needs.

=== Health ===
During the colonial period, healthcare was limited to a single facility, the Hôpital Fonds Social du Kivu (FSK). Supplementary rural clinics were later established in Walungu, Karhongo, Mulamba, Ikoma, and Kamanyola groupements. More substantial progress in health infrastructure emerged during the 1980s when the Democratic Republic of the Congo—then known as Zaire—introduced a system of urban and rural health zones. This reform led to the creation of the Walungu and Nyangezi health zones. Since 2003, the chiefdom has functioned as a Health District comprising four health zones: Walungu, Nyangezi, Mubumbano, and Kaniola.

Health structures

| No. | Area | Structures | No. of beds | Beneficiaries | Land area |
|---|---|---|---|---|---|
| 1. | Nyangezi: 13 structures | Hôpital Général de Référence de Nyangezi, CS de Mushenyi, Muzinzi, Nyangezi Kamisimbi, Munya-Ibambiro, Kamanyola, Mazigiro, Bushinge, Kahinga, Kalungo, Kalegane, and CH de Kamanyola | 125 | 182,009 | 342 km ^{2} |
| 2. | Walungu: 24 structures | Hôpital Général de Référence de Walungu, CH de Muku, CS de Walungu, CSR de Burhale, Bideka, Kalole, Kazimu, Rhusindye, Cidodobo, Ikoma, Ibinza, Nyandja, Muku, Rukwende, Mugogo, Cagombe, Cugikiro, Izirangabo, Karhundu, Lurhala, Mwendo, Mulamba, Nyakakoba, Cazi, and Kampusé | 129 | 183,063 | 707 km ^{2} |
| 3. | Kaniola: 12 structures | CS de Budodo, Cagala, Izege, Kaniola, Luntukulu, Mudirhi, Mwirama, Nzibira, Murhali, Nyamarhege, Nindaja, and Hôpital Général de Référence de Kaniola | 84 | 119,910 | 447 km ^{2} |
| 4. | Mubumbano: 13 structures | Hôpital Général de Référence de Mubumbano, CS de Mubumbano, Lubona, Irongo, Mukungwe, Luciga, Burhale, Karhundu, Burhuza, Tubimbi, Ciherano, Ibula, and Bwahungu | 65 | 116,324 | 108 km ^{2} |
| | Totals | 62 | 403 | 601 306 | 1604 km ^{2} |

Source: South Kivu Provincial Health Division.

Despite this institutional framework, healthcare provision remains inadequate. According to the Ngweshe Local Development Plan 2010–2014, the chiefdom's population of 601,306 was served by only 62 health facilities, equating to an average of one facility per 9,698 residents. The geographical dispersion of the rural population, combined with difficult terrain, poses further challenges to healthcare access. Many residents are required to travel long distances on foot through hazardous conditions to reach medical services. Human resource shortages further compound these challenges. The health district had only 20 doctors as of the 2010–2014 report, resulting in a doctor-to-population ratio of 1:30,065. Moreover, the growth rate of the population has outpaced the expansion of medical personnel. Drug supply chains are also unreliable, with many health centers frequently experiencing stockouts of essential medicines.
