= Kaziba Chiefdom =

Chiefdom in Walungu Territory, South Kivu

- Chiefdom
- Chefferie de Kaziba
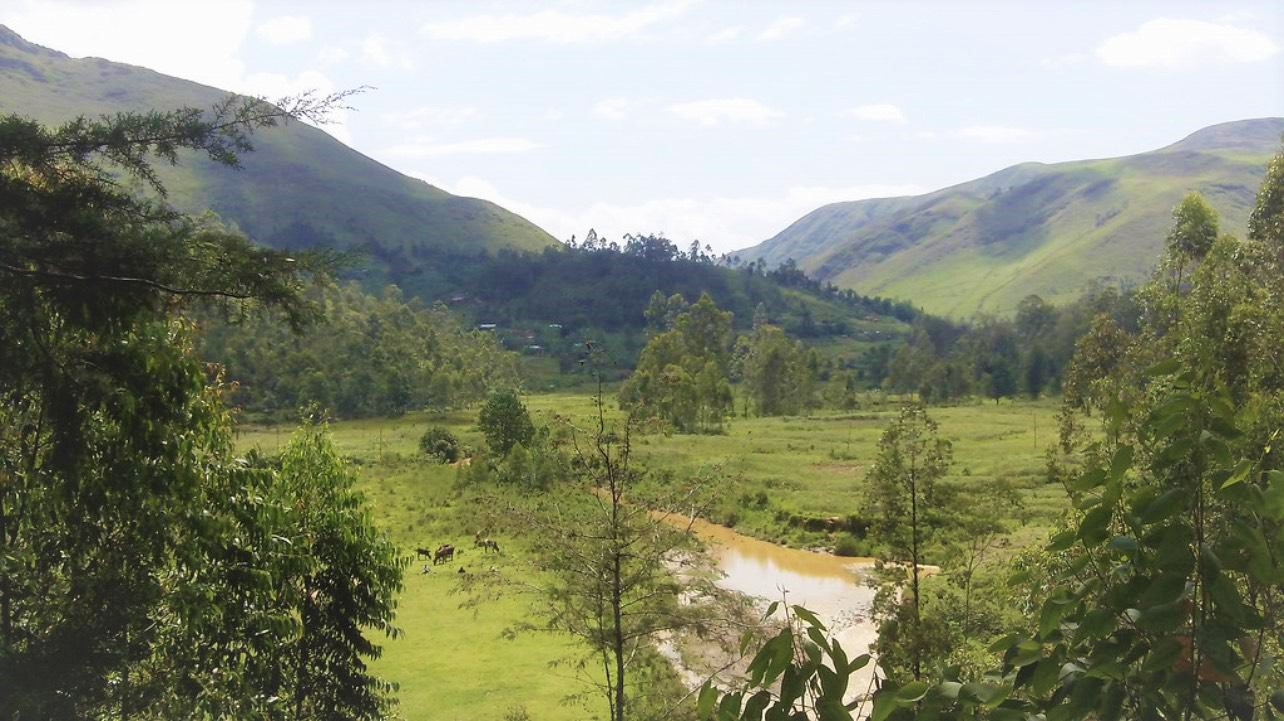
- A view of Kaziba Chiefdom hills landscape
- Country: Democratic Republic of the Congo
- Province: South Kivu
- Territory: Walungu
- Capital: Lwanguku

Government
  - Mwami: Dirk Majiri IV Chimanye N'nakaziba

Area
  - Total: 195 km^{2} (75 sq mi)

Population (2018)
  - Total: 44,235
- Time zone: UTC+2 (CAT)
- Official language: French
- National language: Kiswahili
- Website: https://kazibaonline.com/

The Kaziba Chiefdom (French: Chefferie de Kaziba) is a chiefdom located in the Walungu Territory of South Kivu province in the eastern region of the Democratic Republic of the Congo. Its capital, Lwanguku, lies approximately 55 kilometers south of Bukavu. The chiefdom spans an area of 195 square kilometers and is home to a population of 44,235 as of 2018, primarily composed of the Shi people, alongside communities of Bafuliru, Barega, Babembe, Banyindu, and Banyamulenge. Bordered by the Luvubu River and Bafuliru Chiefdom to the east, the Luhwindja Chiefdom to the south, the Ngweshe Chiefdom to the north, and the Luindi and Burhinyi chiefdoms to the west, its geographical landscape includes rivers, mountains, and Lake Lungwa.

Kaziba Chiefdom is administratively divided into 15 groupements, with Mashi and Swahili as the predominant languages. The local economy is driven by agriculture, livestock farming, artisanal mining, small-scale trade, fish farming, and other artisanal activities.

== Etymology ==
The name Kaziba is derived from the Bazibaziba, a sub-group of the Bashi people historically inhabiting the region. Originally, the population was known as the Bahanga Nyumpa, meaning "Builders of Houses". However, the name Bazibaziba emerged from a significant historical event involving Kangere, a Mwami of the dynasty. Kangere committed an egregious act by abducting the cow of his nephew, named Mwihwa in the Mashi language—an offense considered unforgivable. In response, his subjects expressed their disapproval by lowering their heads and closing their eyes, a gesture known as kuziba in Mashi. This act of collective condemnation led to the name Bazibaziba, meaning "those who close their eyes", which eventually evolved into Kaziba as the designation for the chiefdom.

== Geography ==
Kaziba Chiefdom is located in the eastern part of the Democratic Republic of the Congo, sharing borders with Rwanda to the east and Kabare Territory to the north. It lies about forty kilometers north of Bukavu, measured as the crow flies, and is accessible through a 55-kilometer road section connecting it to Bukavu. The chiefdom is situated at an altitude ranging from 1500m to 3200m above sea level, situated within the Mitumba Mountains. The rugged relief of Kaziba Chiefdom is characterized by mountains, which cover approximately half of the chiefdom's surface and reach heights of up to 3200m above sea level. The central part of the region is marked by the "V" valley of the Luzinzi River, offering a contrasting landscape amidst the high mountains. Towards the north, plateaus dominate the terrain, specifically in the Cibanda and Cihumba groupements, with an average altitude of 1900m.

=== Hydrology ===
Kaziba Chiefdom is rich predominantly in rivers, streams, and springs. The region is home to approximately 104 rivers, 196 springs, and 30 ponds. Notably, the chiefdom is flanked by significant rivers, including the Kashanja River, Nachibumdu River, Mugaba River, Kabuje River, Nkombo River, Shaliro River, Magaja River, and Luvubu River.

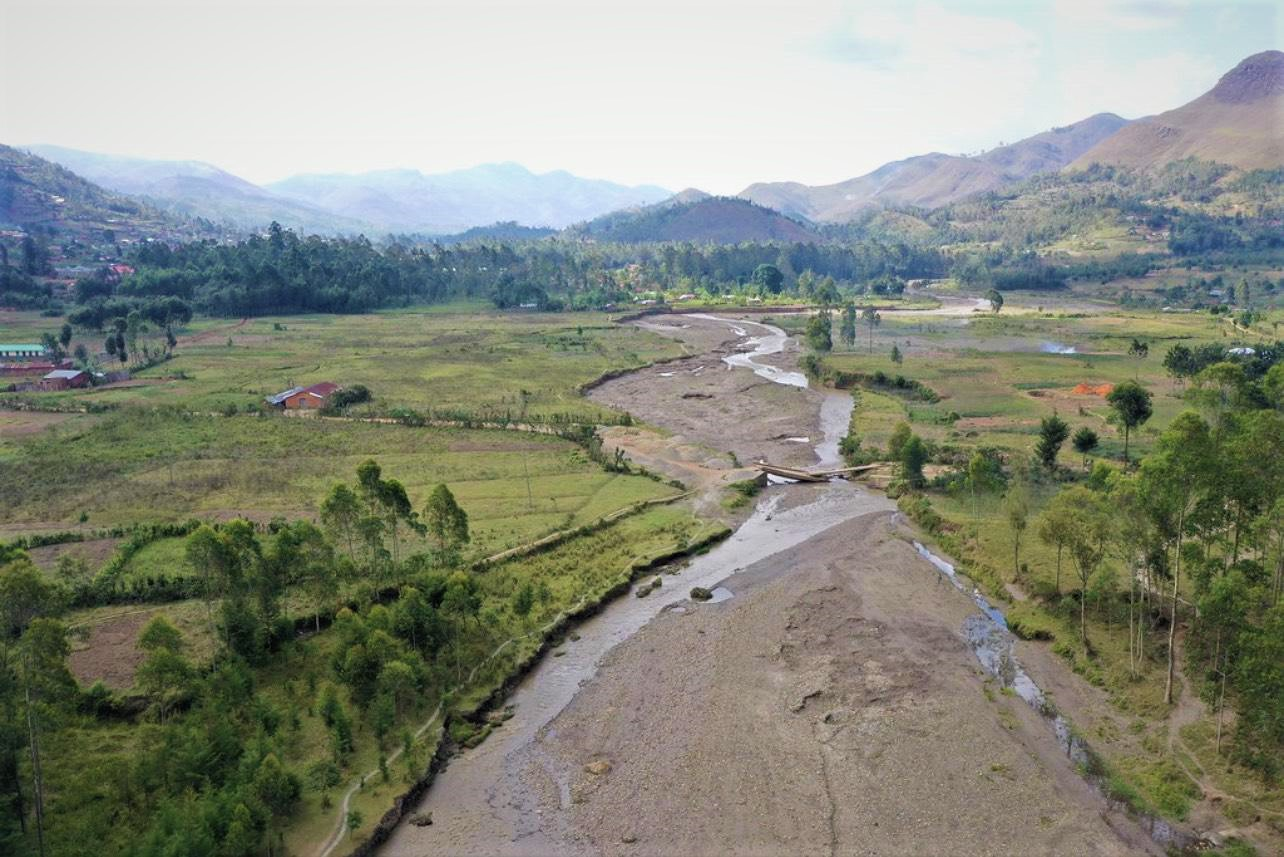
Luzinzi River

The Luvubu River originates from Mount Mukono in the southeastern part of Kaziba Chiefdom. It eventually joins the Ruzizi River, coursing between the boundaries of Kaziba and Bafuliiru Chiefdom, dotted with gorges and rapids. The river's left tributaries include Cibunguza, Lurhale, Luke, and Chitanzi, while Kabindja serves as its main right tributary, accompanied by numerous smaller streams. Moreover, Kaziba Chiefdom's water resources encompass two hydrographic basins: the rivers of the Ruzizi watershed and the Luzinzi River, originating from the southern mountain range, particularly the Mubuga swamps. The Luzinzi River flows forcefully through the Kashozi groupement (grouping) before converging with the Lulindja River, forming the valley that bears its name. This river immensely contributes to the chiefdom's prosperity by enabling market gardening, food crop cultivation, and serving as a source of construction materials. Lwashanja River is another significant waterway sourced from Lake Mudekera in the Cirimiro groupement, known for its Lwashanja fall. The river eventually joins the Namuna River in Luhwinja Chiefdom, acting as a boundary between Kaziba and Luhwinja Chiefdoms.

Aside from rivers, streams, and springs, the chiefdom includes two lakes of undetermined altitude and lacking fish. Lake Mudekera, situated in the center-west of the chiefdom, is accessible by road. On the other hand, Lake Lungwe, located in the extreme southeast of Kaziba Chiefdom, is believed to be the mythical origin of cows in Kaziba society. Despite its lack of fish, both lakes remain relatively unexplored, with Lake Lungwe offering a peek of untouched nature, though oppugning to reach due to the absence of a motorable road.

=== Geology ===
The region has a wide range of altitudes and valuable mineral resources. The chiefdom encompassed a rugged terrain with streams flowing on plateaus formed by red corn falls. The plateau valleys are more grounded and feature V-shaped formations. Prominent peaks within the region include Mount Mukono at around 3200m, Mount Kange at approximately 3170m, Mount Mubuga also at around 3170m, Mount Bumwe at 2903m, Mont Ngonone at 2405m, Mount Chinpulungu at 2404m, Mount Nabumbu at 2184m, Mount Ngando at 2025m, Mount Mbogwe at 2025m, and Mount Kahya at around 1900m. The chiefdom featured notable iron deposits, which conventionally served as the primary metal for cutlery and artisanal tools. Kaziba Chiefdom is also known to hold copper deposits, most notably in the Bulumbwa groupement, although these resources remain untapped. Incidentally, the region is rich in gold, with mining activities concentrated in areas like Kashozi, Butuzi, and Chiburhi. Mining, especially gold and cassiterite extraction from Lwindi Chiefdom, plays a pivotal role in the chiefdom's sustenance. Artisanal gold diggers exploit the rivers throughout the region, but the most significant gold deposit is found in the south, within the Kashozi, Butuzi, and Chiburhi groupements at higher altitudes. Additionally, other valuable minerals, such as oil, remain unexploited potential resources.

=== Vegetation ===
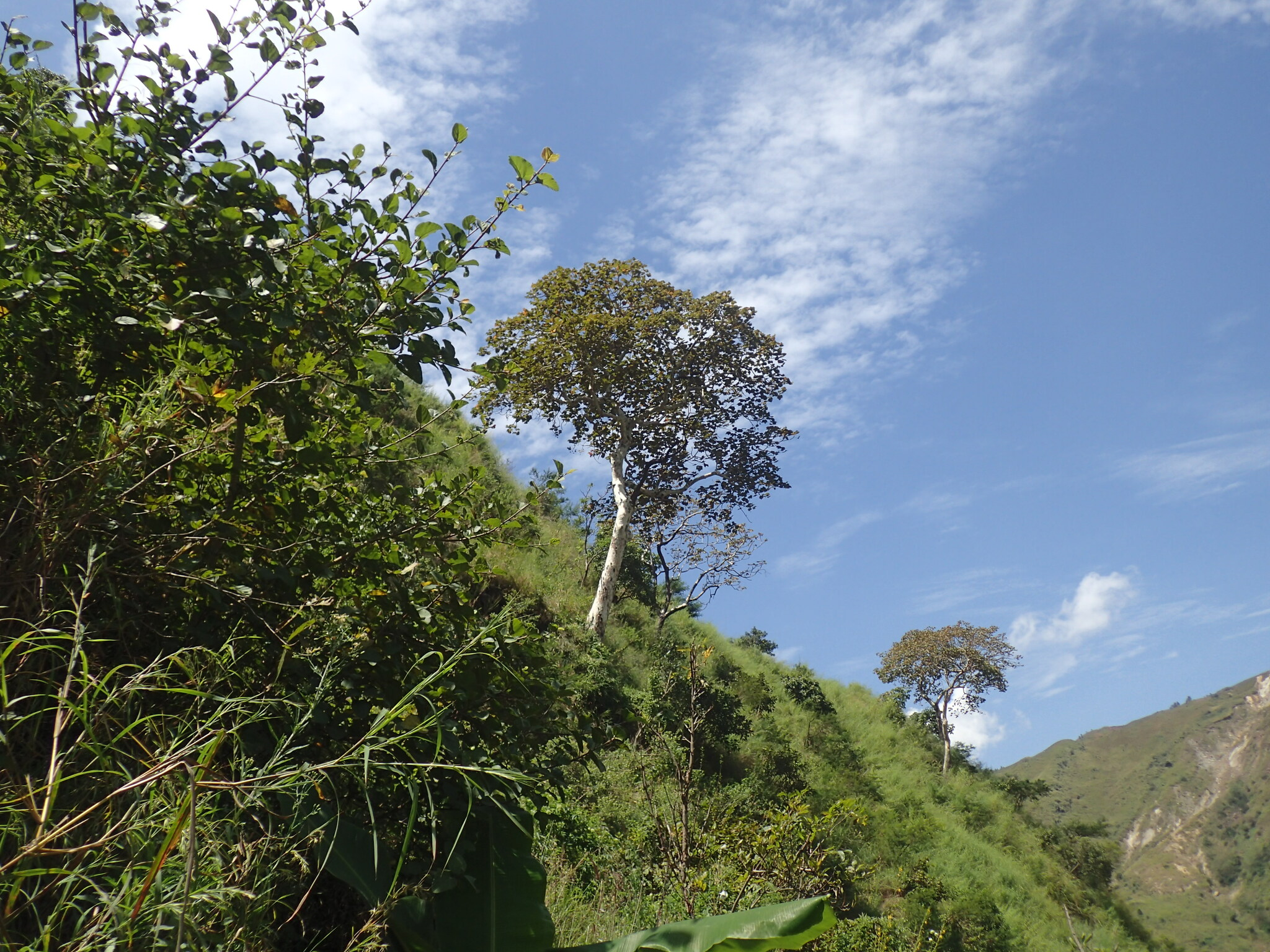
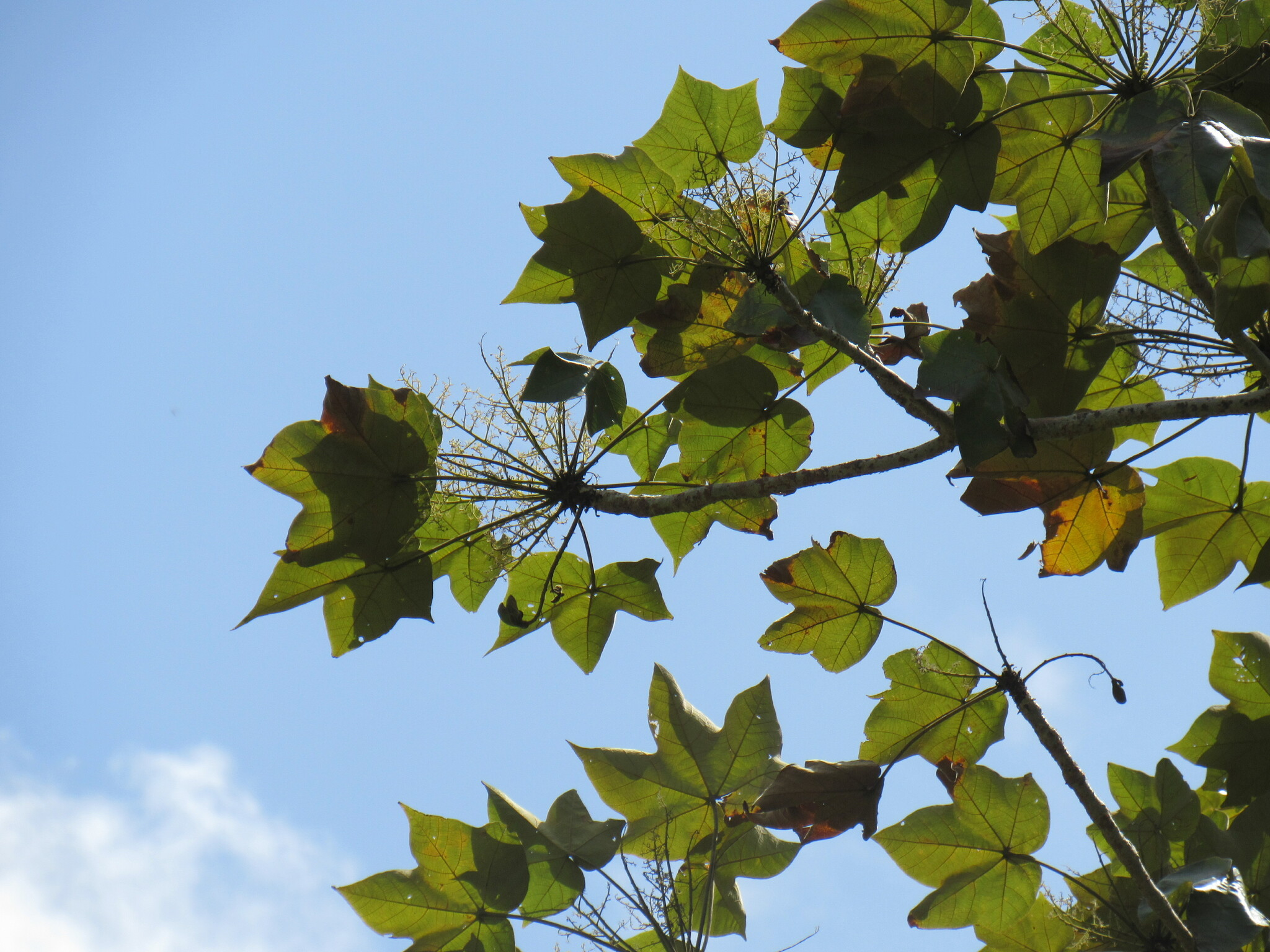
Large-Leaved Star-Chestnut (Sterculia quinqueloba) in Walungu Territory

The high-altitude region's vegetation has a diverse topography with stepped formations. The dominant plantations include Cypress, Eucalyptus, Grevillea, and Pinus, which serve as valuable resources for timber production and other industries. The region also has altitude forests with Bamboo and Prunus africana that support wildlife and ecosystem functions. The cultivation of Coffee and Cinchona contributes to the region's economic growth. Amidst the stepped vegetation, altitude forests thrive, providing essential ecological benefits.

=== Climate ===
The Kaziba Chiefdom experiences a humid subtropical climate at higher altitudes. The dry season prevails from mid-June to September, marked by reduced rainfall and lower humidity levels. Clear skies and relatively cooler temperatures create favorable conditions for outdoor activities and agricultural enterprises. Conversely, the rainy season starts from September to May, with increasing rainfall and higher humidity levels.

=== Administrative division ===
The mwami is the paramount chief of the chiefdom. He is assisted in governance by several hierarchical leaders: Barhwali (groupement chiefs), barhambo (village chiefs), bashamuka (hill chiefs), and bagula (family chiefs). Succession to the throne follows a hereditary principle, with the eldest son traditionally inheriting the position after the death of the mwami. When a mwami is afflicted with an incurable illness, his family and close associates entrust him to the bajinji, the guardians of tradition, who care for him until his death. The bajinji officially announced his death on the eighth day following his passing and initiated the ceremonial process of transporting his remains to the royal burial site, known as luvumbu, located in the Kashozi groupement. During the enthronement of a new mwami, customary regalia are worn, including the lushembe (crown) and leopard skin, both of which symbolize power.

Kaziba Chiefdom is administratively divided into groupements (groupings), each led by a chef de groupement (groupement chief), who is directly appointed by the paramount mwami. These leaders belong to the royal family and are referred to as princes, nobles, muluzi, or murhwali. However, in some exceptional cases, non-princes may be appointed to these positions. The three current groupements led by princes are Mulambi, Ngando, and Chiburhi. Each groupement is further divided into localités (villages), which are governed by chef de village (village chief). The mwami delegates authority to the groupement leaders, who, in turn, delegate certain powers to village chiefs (barhambo). The appointment of village leaders is made by the paramount mwami based on recommendations from the groupement leaders. The villages are further divided into smaller administrative units known as hills, each under the leadership of a mushamuka (hill chief), who is appointed by the groupement leader. These hill chiefs oversee the bagula (family chiefs), who form the foundation of the local social structure.

==== Groupements ====
As of 2018, the Kaziba Chiefdom is composed of 15 groupements and 58 localités:

- Bulumbwa/Bulumbwe
- Butuzi
- Chihumba
- Chibanda
- Chrimiro
- Kabembe
- Kahungwe
- Kashanga
- Kashozi
- Ngando
- Lukube
- Muchingwa
- Muhumba
- Mulambi
- Chiburhi

== History ==
According to oral tradition, the origins of Kaziba Chiefdom trace back to mwami Kangere, considered its first ruler. He was the fourth son of Namuga Mubondo, also known as Namuhoye, the daughter of mwami Nalwindi of present-day Lwindi Chiefdom, then part of the Urega region of the Lega people. Namuhoye had seven sons, all of whom became kings: Kabare, Muganga, Nanindja, Kangere, Nachinda, Narhana, and Nalwanda.

Mwami Kangere was known for his fierce, aggressive, and unscrupulous leadership. His rule became infamous for an incident in which he stole a cow from his nephew, an act considered a grave taboo in Bashi society, as uncles swear oaths by their nephews. In response, the elder courtiers covered Kangere's eyes with their palms as a symbolic gesture of condemnation. This act, described by the Mashi verb "kuziba" (meaning "to close one's eyes"), gave rise to the name Kaziba, meaning "land of those who close their eyes". The Bahana Nyumpa ("Builders of Houses") came then to be known as the Bazibaziba ("those who close their eyes").

Before its official recognition under Belgian colonial rule, Kaziba Chiefdom was governed by eleven bamis (kings), beginning with mwami Kangere, who ruled from 1677 to 1701. He was succeeded by Nshulilujo (1701–1725), Ngiringa (1725–1754), and Ngwina (1754–1770). The leadership continued with Chivula Wa Chivula (1770–1788), Karhende Majiri I (1788–1803), and Karhende II (1804–1815). Kabonwa Ka Bihembe ruled from 1816 to 1823, followed by Mpwiji Majiri II, who led from 1824 to 1860. The reign of Mukenge (also known as Muhirhira) is not precisely documented, but he was followed by Chimanye I, who ruled from 1882 to 1906.

The official establishment of the Kaziba Chiefdom took place on 12 April 1929, through a decree issued by the district commissioner of Kivu District. At the time, the chiefdom was under the rule of mwami Majiri Nnakaziba, who governed from 1906 to 1936. His successors included Kabonwa II Muhigirha (1936–1965), Chimanye II Kabonwa (1965–2005), and the current ruler, Dirk Majiri IV Chimanye N'nakaziba.

=== Conflict and insecurity ===
The region has been plagued by conflict and insecurity during both the First and Second Congo Wars. In the second half of October 1996, during the First Congo War, units of the Alliance of Democratic Forces for the Liberation of Congo-Zaire (AFDL) and the Rwandan Patriotic Army (RPA) massacred 130 civilians in the Kaziba Chiefdom. On October 16 of that year, they callously massacred 36 civilians in the Kaziba Chiefdom's commercial center. The victims' bodies were buried in a mass grave near the Mennonite church in Kaziba Chiefdom's town center. In Namushuaga/Lukube, soldiers killed many civilians with spears and machetes. In Cihumba, where numerous inhabitants had sought refuge, the armed forces killed at least 11 civilians. These atrocities were accompanied by looting of the hospital, stores, and many dwellings in the region. The small local hydroelectric plant also fell victim to the soldiers' destruction. During the Second Congo War, the Rally for Congolese Democracy (RCD) conducted attacks on civilian populations.

== Culture ==
=== Languages ===
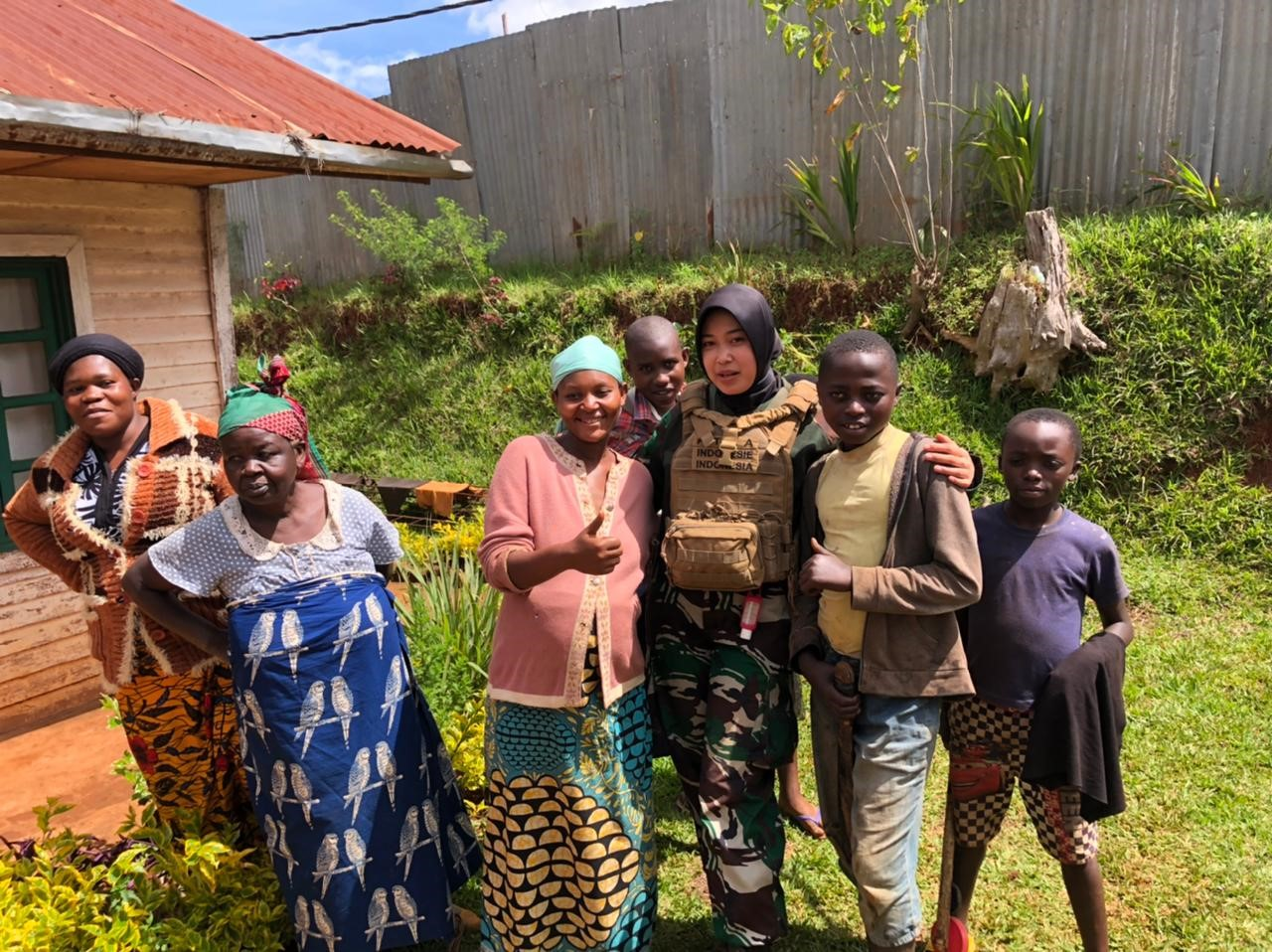
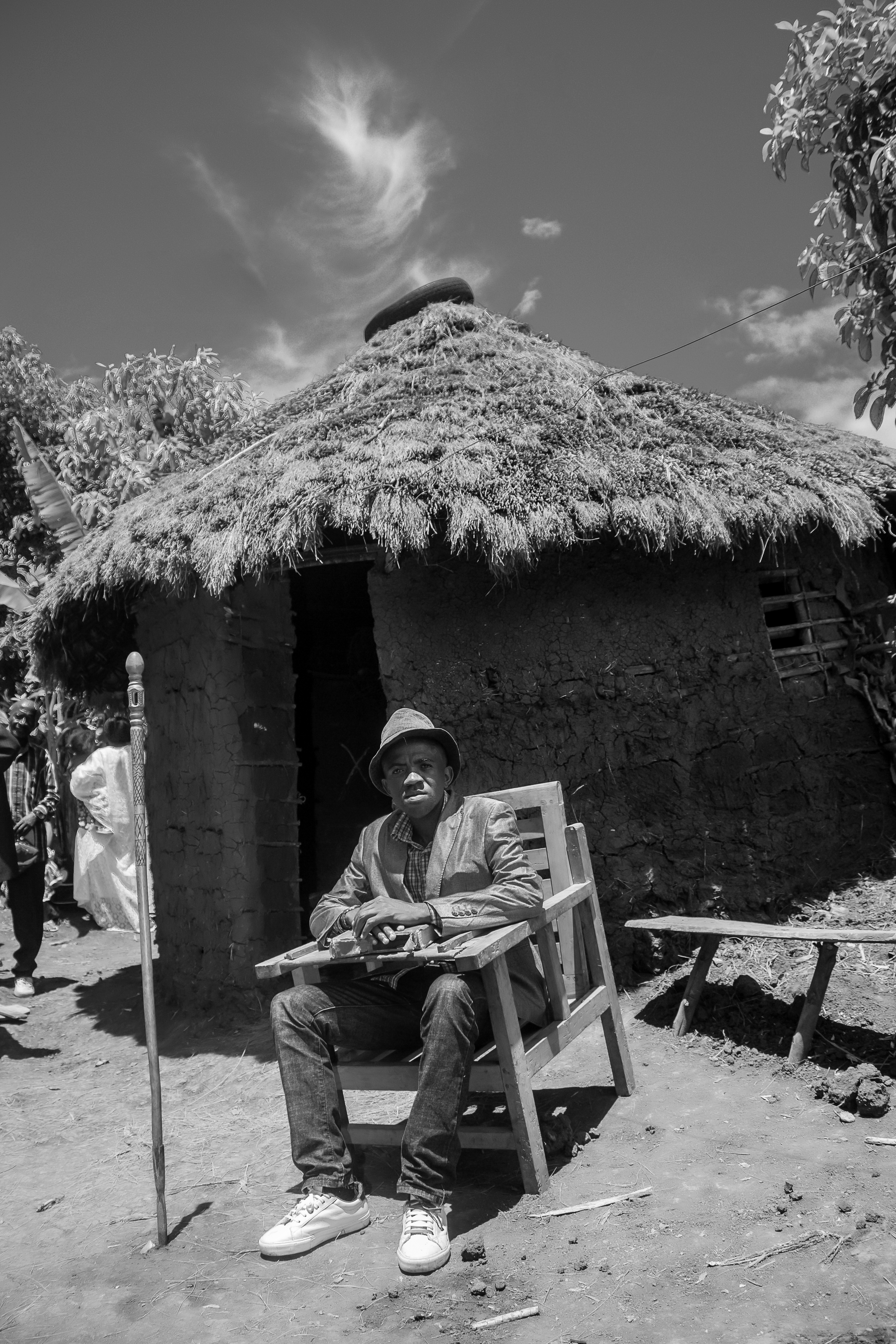
Up: An Indonesian MONUSCO woman peacekeeper interacts with Congolese women. Down: The head of a family in Walungu Territory.

Mashi is the predominant language spoken, with over 85% of the population using it as their primary means of communication. Kiswahili, recognized as a national language, holds the second position in terms of usage. It serves as a unifying language, facilitating communication between the Bashi and other ethnic groups. French, the official language of the Democratic Republic of the Congo, is predominantly used in administrative and educational contexts but is not commonly spoken by farmers.

=== Sports ===
Association Football is the most popular sport, particularly among the youth. The Association du Football de Kaziba (AFKA) oversees football activities, with Salongo Stadium (Stade Salongo) serving as the primary playing field. Each groupement has at least one football team. Notable teams include Bukane Football Club and Radi Football Club from Muchingwa groupement, Nouvelle Étoile Football Club from Kashozi, and Nyuki Football Club from Lukube. Other teams, such as Onze Rapide Football Club from Butuzi and Buda Sport Football Club represented Kashanga and Chirimiro groupements. Additional teams include Football Club Kabembe (Kabembe groupement), Football Club Vinga (Ngando groupement), Football Club Ekenge (Chibanda groupement), Football Club Kafindjo (Bulumbwa groupement), Football Club Chimpwi (Kahungwe groupement), and Football Club Sangara (Muhumba groupement).

Women's football is also present, with a team that recruits players from across the chiefdom. However, many teams face challenges due to a lack of proper facilities for training and competitions. This issue is exacerbated by the rugged terrain of Kaziba, which is predominantly mountainous. Salongo Stadium, located in the Muchingwa groupement, is the largest football field in the area but remains undeveloped, with poor playing conditions. Despite these limitations, it serves as the primary venue for championship matches organized by the AFKA. Apart from football, other sports have a limited presence. Karate is represented by a single club, Nakashi-Zuki, which operates in the Muchingwa groupement. Volleyball is primarily played within educational institutions, with Institut Technique Médicale-Kaziba (ITM-Kaziba) hosting the only known school volleyball club.

=== Leisure ===
Traditional games such as Sombi (also known as Muchuba) and checkers are widely played, engaging both adults and youth. The harp remains a significant cultural instrument, producing traditional melodies highly appreciated by the elderly. Dance performances are integral to Kaziba's cultural landscape, particularly those of the Ntole dancers, who perform for local leaders, as well as groups specializing in Congolese music. Checkers is a popular pastime among both educated and uneducated youth.

Kaziba has a single digital cinema, located in Muchingwa. Establishments selling alcoholic beverages are widespread, particularly in the central areas of Muchingwa, Ngando, Chibanda, and Lukube. In recent years, the chiefdom has witnessed the emergence of musical groups composed of local youth, including Cash Money, Kaziba Boys, and Lil Boys of Muchingwa.

== Economy ==
Kaziba Chiefdom is predominantly agrarian, with agriculture, livestock farming, small-scale trade, crafts, transport, and mining forming the backbone of economic activity. The region operates as a self-subsistence economy, with approximately 30% of the population engaged in mining activities within various quarries. Agriculture is the primary economic driver, with staple crops such as cassava, bananas, sweet potatoes, and potatoes being widely cultivated. Market gardening is also practiced in certain areas, where crops like carrots, cabbages, onions, eggplant, tomatoes, and spinach are grown.

=== Agriculture ===
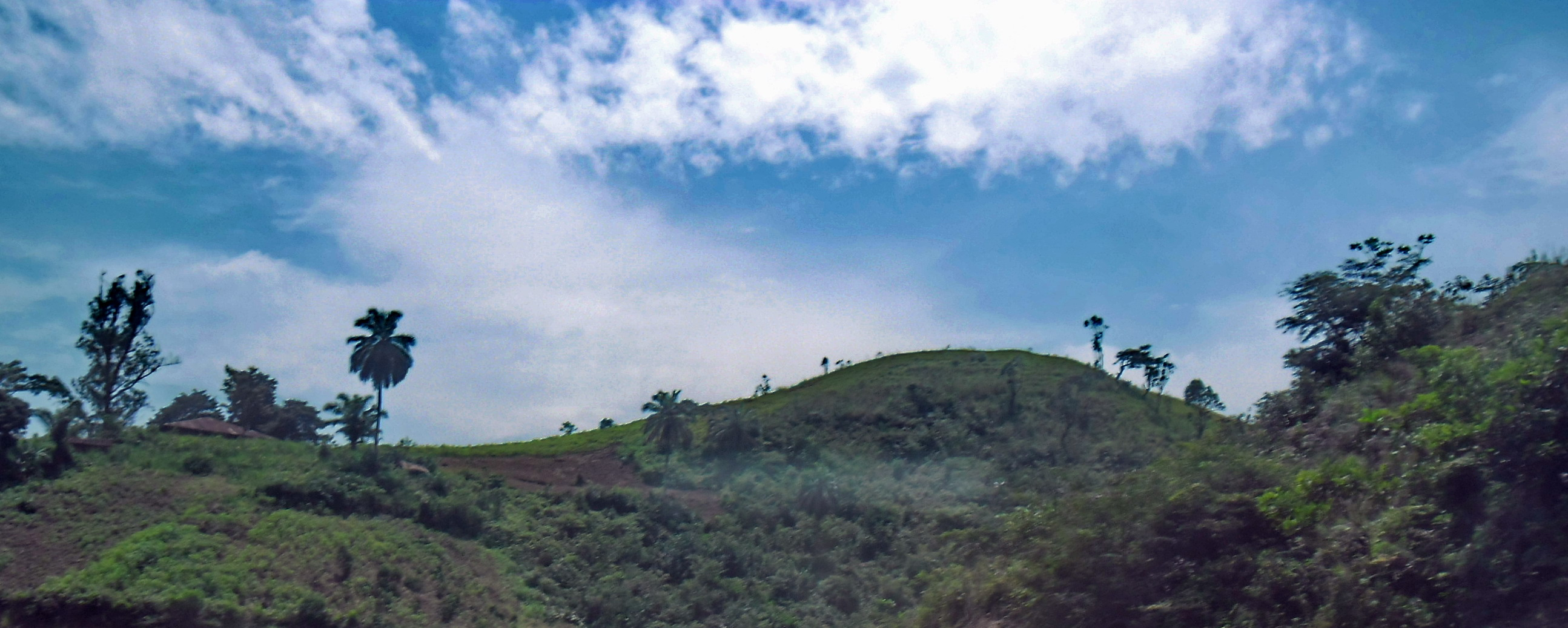
The scenic sky over the mountainous landscape of Walungu Territory, rising nearly 6,000 feet above sea level, with rugged, unpaved roads.

Kaziba Chiefdom's soil composition, which includes clay, sand, and stones, influences agricultural productivity. The land is divided into three categories of cultivation: food crops, industrial crops, and afforestation. However, the availability of arable land is limited due to poor soil fertility, especially in the mountainous regions where non-fertile red mud is prevalent. The valleys, particularly those along the Luzinzi River, provide more suitable conditions for cultivating sorghum, sweet potatoes, potatoes, beans, cassava, rice, and soybeans due to the presence of river networks that support irrigation. Despite these agricultural efforts, the chiefdom remains largely dependent on food imports from the Bafuliiru Chiefdom in the Ruzizi Plain.

Cassava is the most widely cultivated and consumed crop, serving as the staple food. It is grown in all groupements but experiences low production levels due to unfavorable climatic conditions, particularly in the colder southern areas such as Butuzi, parts of Kashozi, and Chiburhi, where temperatures can drop to as low as 2°C. The eastern groupements bordering the Ruzizi Plain, including Kahungwe, Bulumbwa, and Chiburi, have more favorable conditions for cassava cultivation. However, production has been severely impacted by the African cassava mosaic virus. In response, organizations such as Malteser International and the Cassava Project of the Catholic University of Bukavu have introduced mosaic-resistant cassava varieties to mitigate the damage.

Banana cultivation is widespread, with several varieties grown for different purposes. The Nkamarha variety is mainly used for brewing local beer (Kasigisi, Muski) or making banana juice, but it is also consumed as a fruit or mixed with cassava flour to make foufou. The Chisamunyu variety is a sweet banana used for food, often paired with beans or tomatoes. Other cultivated varieties include Mushaba (plantain banana), Gros Michel, and Banane Royale (Kamaramasenge), all of which contribute to household income through sales at local markets.

Bean cultivation is across-the-board but limited by the lack of available land for fallowing, leading to low production levels. Beans are predominantly grown in banana plantations, near homes, and in small plots within the valleys of Muhumba, Luzinzi, Kalamba, Nkombo, Nakashaka, and Nacishasha, as well as on sloping terrains in all groupements. The chiefdom produces both dwarf and twining bean varieties, with the most common dwarf varieties being Mwami ahana, Lwirungu, and Kanjegere. Beans are consumed alone or combined with other staple foods such as sweet potatoes, potatoes, foufou, or bananas.

Sorghum cultivation is largely concentrated in the valleys, particularly in Luzinzi and Kalambo, where it is often grown alongside beans. The grain is processed using a millstone or grinder and is consumed in various forms, including porridge and foufou, either alone or mixed with cassava flour. Sorghum flour is also widely used for weaning infants and serves as the primary yeast for fermenting banana juice into Kasigisi.

In addition to food crops, the chiefdom also cultivates industrial plants, including Coffea arabica and Coffea canephora, as well as Cinchona.

=== Livestock ===
The chiefdom is home to a variety of livestock, both large and small, including cows, sheep, chickens, and rabbits. Near the villages, there are also wild animals such as wild cats (muganyi), marsh otters (chigoha), wolves (nyambwe), field and forest brown rats (Mukumbi), vipers (chibugusha), deer, monkeys (nchima), buffaloes (mbogo), and wild boars (nshenzi), referred to as "Ngulube y'emuzirhu".

=== Brick-making industry ===
The region benefits from abundant clay-rich soil, which supports a thriving brick-making industry. As a result, the construction of durable houses has become common, with 70% of structures built using sustainable materials. Semi-durable housing accounts for 20% of buildings, while traditional constructions make up the remaining 10%.

=== Trade ===
Trade is facilitated by various trade routes for exchanging goods. The Kaziba-Bukavu Axis is one of the primary routes, with cypress boards being the chiefdom's main trade product. These boards are sold in Bukavu, while the return trips bring manufactured products such as salt, soap, loincloths, shoes, oil, petroleum, construction materials, and various food items like fish, fry, and corn flour. Market gardeners from Nyangezi also engage in trade, exchanging their produce, including bean leaves, eggplants, and onions, at the Mélange market in return for potatoes. Another trade route, the Kaziba-Kiringye-Kamanyola-Lubarika Axis, facilitates the movement of fry, which are bought at the Kamanyola and Kiringye markets and sold in Mulengeza and Katudu markets. This trade, which primarily involves women, requires three days of walking.

The Kaziba-Kahya-Rugezi-Minembwe Axis supplies Kaziba with livestock, including cows, goats, sheep, and chickens, which are purchased at the Kabingo market in the Bafuliru Chiefdom. Some of these animals are consumed locally, while others are resold in neighboring markets such as Luhwinja, Burhinyi, Ngweshe, or even in distant markets in the Basile Chiefdom. In exchange for livestock, fruits like oranges and plums, as well as cassava, are purchased. The Kaziba-Luhwinja-Burhinyi axis facilitates further exchanges, with Kaziba receiving corn, potatoes, and curdled milk from Luhwinja and oil from Burhinyi. In return, Kaziba displays manufactured products and foodstuffs at the Katudu market.

However, trade faces challenges due to poor infrastructure. The lack of roads forces traders to transport goods on foot, sometimes covering distances of up to 100 km. Additionally, the absence of warehouses in the large markets means that farmers often sell their crops at low prices, as they cannot transport their goods back home once they have carried them to the market. This creates a situation where prices fluctuate based on urgency, and farmers are forced to sell their products quickly, often at a loss.

=== Craft ===
Pottery, particularly made from ceramics sourced from the Bulumbwa groupement, is produced for domestic use, including flower pots, water storage vessels, and banana brewing pots. Carpentry is also widespread, with the production of furniture, cabinets, and building materials. Soap making, which is often a family business, is another key craft, with specialized producers such as the Association Amama and Groupe Amuka. The raw materials for soap production, including caustic soda and palm oil, are sourced from Bukavu, Burhinyi Chiefdom, and Bafuliiru Chiefdom. Weaving and basket making also contribute to the local economy, with products like ropes, mats, and baskets sold in local markets of Muchingwa, Lukube, and others. However, the once-thriving forge industry has dwindled, with the focus now on manufacturing small knives from scrap metal rather than iron ore extracted locally in the mines of Kabwekaziba, in the Kashozi groupement.

=== Transport and communication ===
The Kaziba-Bukavu route, approximately 55 kilometers long, is the primary transport axis, and it is served by vehicles, typically of the Fuso brand, operating under the local transport association, ALOVETRAKI. Despite the presence of a dirt road and limited concrete bridges, the region remains difficult to access, and transportation is often carried out on foot or by motorbike. The region's communication infrastructure includes local radio stations, such as Umoja FM, and mobile phone coverage, which is supported by Airtel and Orange RDC antennas, although the signal strength is weak and does not cover the entire chiefdom. Traditional communication methods, including the drum, horn, and flute, are still used for local announcements and ceremonies.

=== Mining ===
Gold is mined in the Kashozi and Butuzi groupements, with artisanal mining being the primary method of extraction. Locally mined gold and cassiterite are sold in regional markets like Mulengeza and Katudu. Other precious minerals, such as oil, remain unexplored but could hold potential for future economic development. The region's rivers, particularly in the southern groupements of Kashozi, Butuzi, and Chiburhi, are key sources of gold.

== Demographics ==
Kaziba Chiefdom is home to a diverse population comprising multiple ethnic groups. The predominant ethnic group is the Bashi, who constitute the majority of the population. Other ethnic communities present include the Bafuliiru, Barega, Banyindu, Babembe, and Banyamulenge. The latter are primarily concentrated in the high-altitude groupements of Butuzi and Kashozi.

=== Healthcare ===
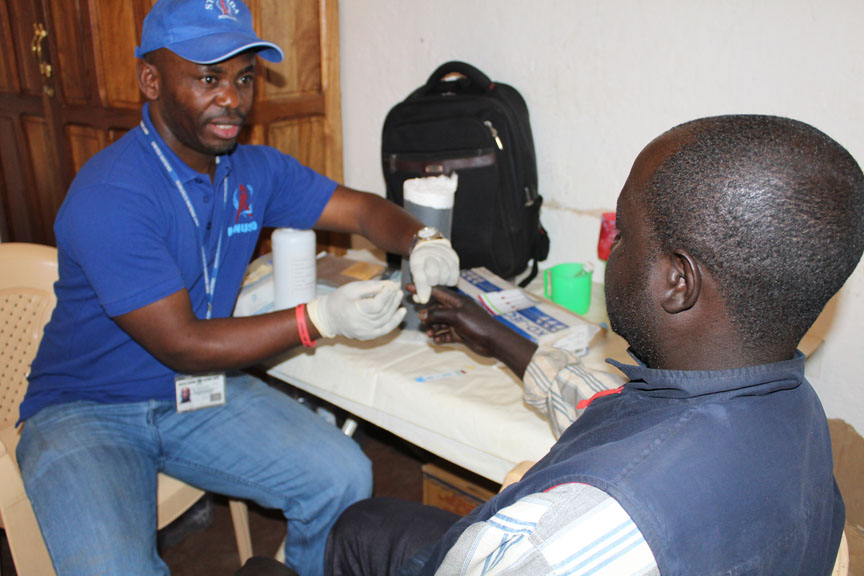
MONUSCO HIV/AIDS Section conducting a sensitization session on HIV/AIDS for ex-combatants of the Democratic Forces for the Liberation of Rwanda (FDLR) at the Walungu transit center.

The chiefdom is served by the Kaziba General Reference Hospital (Hôpital Général de Référence de Kaziba), which has played a crucial role in the region's healthcare system since the colonial era. Originally managed by Norwegian missionaries during the Belgian period, the hospital was later transferred to the 5ème Communauté des Églises Libres des Pentecôtes en Afrique (5ème CELPA) after the missionaries' departure. In addition to the hospital, the chiefdom has 15 health center posts that provide medical services to the local population.

=== Religion ===
Christianity is the dominant faith, followed by Islam and traditional animist beliefs. Christians are represented by both Protestant and Catholic communities. Protestants account for the largest religious group and are affiliated with various denominations, including CELPA, CEPAC, CEBIK, CECA, CBCA, and CNCA, as well as Methodist and Anglican congregations. The restorationist denomination like Jehovah's Witnesses as well as CELPA Rénovée also have a presence in the region. Catholics constitute a significant portion of the population, while a smaller percentage of residents adhere to Islam. The Muslim community is centered around a central mosque located in the Lukube groupement. Additionally, a portion of the population maintains traditional animist practices, particularly in more remote areas, where ancestral worship remains prevalent.

According to demographic records, Kaziba Chiefdom has a population of approximately 38,834 people, with the following religious distribution:

- Catholics: 15% (6,000 individuals)
- Protestants: 74% (28,712 individuals)
- Muslims: 1% (388 individuals)
- Animists: 10% (3,880 individuals)

=== Education ===
Kaziba Chiefdom has various primary, secondary, and higher education institutions. According to the 2008 annual report of the chiefdom, there were 57 primary schools and 25 secondary schools. In addition, the chiefdom is home to several higher education institutions, including the Institut Supérieur des Techniques Médicales (ISTM), which operates in the Muchingwa groupement within the ITM de Kaziba. Other institutions of higher learning include Université Ouverte of Centre Interdisciplinaires pour l'Éducation Permanente (CIDEP) as well as the ISTCF.
