= Karhongo =

Groupement in Ngweshe Chiefdom, DR Congo

Karhongo Nyangezi Karhongo-Nyangezi
- Groupement de Karhongo
- Chinese peacekeepers serving with MONUSCO repairing Shengezimu Bridge in Karhongo
- Country: Democratic Republic of the Congo
- Province: South Kivu
- Territory: Walungu
- Chiefdom: Ngweshe

Government
  - Chef de groupement: Pascal Chishugi Cabwine Lungere Nyangezi

Area
  - Total: 215 km^{2} (83 sq mi)

Population (2016 est.)
  - Total: 41,124
- Official language: French
- National language: Kiswahili

Karhongo, also known as Nyangezi or Karhongo-Nyangezi, is one of the 16 groupements of Ngweshe Chiefdom in Walungu Territory, South Kivu, Democratic Republic of the Congo. Its northern boundary follows the Nyakamina River (Bishalalo), separating it from Mumosho groupement in Kabare Territory. To the south, the Luzinzi/Luvungi River separates it from Kaziba Chiefdom and Bafuliiru Chiefdom; to the west, the Mitumba escarpments mark its boundary with Luchiga groupement, while a valley separates it from Ciherano; and to the east, a steep slope descends to the Ruzizi River, which marks the border with Rwanda. Covering approximately 215 square kilometers, Karhongo had an estimated population of 41,124 in 2016, most of whom were Shi.

== Geography ==
Karhongo's predominantly mountainous terrain forms an extension of the Mitumba range, with some peaks reaching approximately 2,500 meters. Marshes lie between the mountains and plateaus.

Hydrologically, the groupement lies within the Congo River drainage basin, with its waters flowing into the Ruzizi River through a network of tributaries. The Ruzizi flows through a deep gorge. The Murhesa River rises near Nkumba at approximately 2,100 meters, west of Mushenyi, and flows northward into the Ruzizi. The Mugera and Bishalalo rivers border the marshy Namubanda basin, first passing through Bwiranga Marsh. The Mugera receives water from smaller rivers, streams and channels before emptying into the Ruzizi.

A hot spring in Karhongo

Karhongo's soils have a sandy-clay texture and are generally low in humus, except in marshy plains scattered throughout the groupement. They can produce good yields when amended with manure or compost. Vegetation is mainly shrub savanna and grassy steppe. Previously, some farmers used fallow periods to restore soil fertility. However, Kivu conflict have led to continuous cultivation without fallow periods or soil amendments, which has contributed to declining soil fertility and crop yields.

Karhongo has a tropical highland climate, with average annual rainfall of approximately 1,500 mm. The rainy season runs from September to May and the dry season from June to August, with a brief dry period in January. Temperatures range from 16°C to 25°C, averaging 20°C.

=== Administration and governance ===
Karhongo is administered by a hereditary chef de groupement (groupement chief), who exercises local administrative and customary authority as the representative of the mwami (paramount chief) of Ngweshe Chiefdom. Charline Ntizala's 2016 study identified Pascal Chishugi Cabwine Lungere Nyangezi as the chief, and Radio La Colombe reported in December 2024 that he remained in office. A council of elders advises the chief on governance, dispute mediation and customary practices. Minor cases are handled locally by designated adjudicators, while more serious matters are referred to the mwami.

Karhongo is divided into 40 villages (localités), each headed by a chef de localité (village chief), who represents the chef de groupement. Village chiefs are assisted by chefs de sous-village or chefs de quartier, who manage local affairs and tax collection.

==== Villages ====
- Ishamba
- Mulamba
- Mubumbano
- Rushebegi
- Kajabi
- Bwarha
- Bushwegel
- Bushwegell
- Bufunji
- Namahwa
- Cibanda
- Mushoji
- Cibuga
- Busonga
- Lurhala
- Lwahi
- Bwashunzu
- Karhumwa
- Bushanyi
- Munga
- Munzizi
- Kandekere
- Cishashu
- Cijingire
- Cibimbi l
- Cibimbi ll
- Murhego
- Kalengera
- Mugajo
- Karhundu
- Bidaho
- Mulende
- Lubanda
- Karhongo
- Irhaga
- Rukanda I
- Rukananda II
- Ntadera
- Kakona
- Cirhundu

== Demographics ==
=== Population and healthcare ===
In 2016, Karhongo had an estimated population of 41,124, most of whom were Shi. Women and girls outnumbered men and boys.

Healthcare providers include churches, other private institutions, and individuals. The general hospital in Muzinzi is managed by the Archdiocese of Bukavu. Health centers (centres de santés; CS) include Mushenyi, Munya, Ibambiro, Ngali, Kahinga and Kimbanguistes, while (postes de santé; PS) include Kalengera, Kahinga, Cijingiri, Ishunda, Buzonza and Maka. Pharmacies include Chiniphar, Bugophar, Pharmacie 2000 and Bitebiphar. Nutrition centers include Veto-Cibimbi, Muzinzi and Cibuga.

=== Religion ===
The Catholic Church first began its evangelization work in Karhongo on 15 September 1906, when Father Joseph Der Haeghe arrived there. Archdiocese of Bukavu describes this as the foundation date of the Mission Thielt Saint-Pierre de Karhongo, which later became the Paroisse Saint-Pierre Apôtre de Cibimbi, South Kivu's first parish. In 1907, the mission was moved from Lukananda to Kaderhe, and in 1948, it was moved again from Kaderhe to Cibimbi, where it has remained.

A second parish was later opened in the Burhale groupement of Ngweshe Chiefdom in 1921.

More than 90% of the population today belongs to Christian groups, including Catholics, Protestants, and Kimbanguists. These religious groups also run many schools, hospitals, clinics, and charity organizations across Ngweshe Chiefdom.

== Economy and infrastructure ==
=== Economy ===
Agriculture in Karhongo mainly supports household subsistence, although some crops are grown commercially. Despite the soil's agricultural potential, yields are often low because of overexploitation, a lack of improved seeds and limited knowledge of cultivation techniques. Crops include cassava, beans, sorghum, maize, sweet potatoes and bananas.

Livestock farming is also practiced, though some farmers use intensive methods. Charline Ntizaline's 2016 study reported that cattle farming, traditionally a source of wealth, was declining because of pasture shortages and looting by armed groups. Residents had shifted to raising small livestock and poultry, although untreated diseases remained a threat. Beekeeping is also practiced in Bushi.

Some families depend on trade because they lack fertile land. Munya is Karhongo's main trading center, with trading busiest on Thursdays and Sundays. Smaller markets include Rchangachanga, operating on Wednesdays; Mushenyi, on Wednesdays and Sundays; and Ngali, on Wednesdays and Saturdays. Trade often includes manufactured goods supplied from Bukavu and Uvira.

=== Housing ===
Karhongo's clay, mixed with sand from the marshes, is used by large teams of brickmakers to produce bricks sold in Bukavu. Clay extraction pits reduce the area available for cultivation, which then contributes to declining agricultural output. Although Karhongo groupement is among the leading brick-producing areas, its housing remains poorly developed. Most housing consists of straw structures.

=== Transport ===
Transportation relies mainly on roads. The Nyangezi-Kaziba-Luhwindja road connects National Route 2 (RN2) with National Route 5 (RN5), which leads toward Uvira. On 13 January 2008, the 5th CELPA (5ème Communauté des Églises Libres de Pentecôte en Afrique) launched construction of the Kansise and Lwashanja bridges along this road. The project cost a reported $88,000 and was funded by the Pentecostal Foreign Mission of Norway. The Kansise bridge was reported to be 11 meters long and 5 meters deep.

The Mumosho–Nyangezi–Kamanyola–Uvira corridor forms part of RN5 and provides a major regional connection between Bukavu and Uvira. In 2020, the Shengezimu Bridge in Nyangezi was rehabilitated by MONUSCO and reopened to traffic on 3 November. In June 2022, the 6-meter-span, 7-meter-high reinforced-concrete Chihanda Bridge on RN5 in Nyangezi collapsed after diverted rainwater eroded its abutments. On 22 August 2022, MONUSCO handed over a prefabricated 25-tonne-capacity metal bridge to the South Kivu Office des Routes (OR). The bridge, estimated to cost $90,000, was funded through the National Road Maintenance Fund (Fonds national d'entretien routier; FONER) and was inaugurated on 4 October 2022.

In June 2024, rehabilitation work was underway on RN5 along the Bukavu–Nyantende–Nyangezi–Ngomo–Kamanyola route.

In December 2024, the 4.95-kilometer Munya-Choga agricultural service road in the groupement was rehabilitated under the PROECCO project, with financial support from the Swiss Agency for Development and Cooperation (SDC). The rehabilitation included widening the road, adding laterite gravel, constructing drainage ditches, and installing two reinforced-concrete bridges. The rehabilitated road was handed over to the community on 18 December 2024. The road provides access to the Choga brickmaking site.

=== Energy ===
The primary sources of energy include firewood, charcoal, oil, gas, and electricity. The Société Nationale d'Électricité (SNEL) supplies electricity. In February 2022, local authorities launched a project to install approximately 30 solar-powered streetlights in the commercial center. Funded by MONUSCO, the project had a reported cost of $40,000.
