= Kaniola Groupement =

Congolese political administrative entity

Kaniola
- Grouping
- Groupement de Kanyola
- Country: Democratic Republic of the Congo
- Province: South Kivu
- Territory: Walungu
- Chiefdom: Ngweshe

Area
  - Total: 138.52 km^{2} (53.48 sq mi)
- Time zone: UTC+2 (CAT)

Kaniola, also denominated as Kanyola, constitutes one of the sixteen groupements (groupings) within the Ngweshe Chiefdom of the Shi populace in Walungu Territory. It is situated at an altitude of 1,800 meters and lies 64 kilometers from the metropolis of Bukavu. It abuts the Kahuzi-Biéga National Park and the Nindja Chiefdom to the northeast, while it is contiguous with the Izege and Walungu groupements to the east. To the west, it is flanked by the Burhale and Mulamba groupements.

== Geography ==
Spanning an expanse of 138.52 km^{2}, with a population density of 399.4 people per square kilometre, Kaniola is home to a population of 60,906. It has a temperate climate with two seasons.

=== Administrative division ===
Administratively, the Kaniola groupement is divided into six sub-groupements, including the chief town (Kaniola Center, although not officially endorsed by the chieftaincy or currently possessing legal status). These groupements are governed by traditional leaders referred to as 'mwamis.' Each groupement is then subdivided into villages (localités) and is under the authority of customary chiefs.

==== Sub-groupements: ====
- Cagala sub-groupement: Led by Chief Ntangano;
- Mwirama sub-groupement: Governed by Byumanine;
- Murhala sub-groupement: Directed by Nyakasane;
- Budodo sub-groupement: Overseen by Nyunda;
- Nyamarhege sub-groupement: Administered by Chief Vuningoma;
- Miduha sub-groupement: Managed by Mupanga;
- Kaniola Center sub-groupement: Under the headship of Herman.

==== Villages ====
Kaniola groupement is subdivided into 53 villages:

- Cagala
- Nakalage
- Chamba
- Cibuga
- Cize-Icurhu
- Iyanga Bagula
- Mwirama
- Bushushu
- Cibanda
- Nabishaka
- Ntabunge
- Ludundu
- Cindubi
- Cirhwakanyi
- Cibira
- Mbuba
- Kaniola
- Nakajaka
- Luya
- Muhungu
- Cirhwa Muhunga
- Lwashunga
- Karhuliza IER
- Karhuliza II
- Cisaza IER
- Mulangana
- Karhwa
- Cisaza II
- Cimbulungu
- Kalongo
- Murhala
- Budogo
- Cega
- Lwengero
- Kahya
- Cagundwe
- Bolole
- Madubo
- Mudirhi
- Cosho
- Bulunga
- Nyamarhege
- Mukama
- Mulambula
- Mubondwe
- Kalengera
- Miduha
- Kangala
- Katudu
- Munyenye IER
- Munyenye II
- Kalengera
- Muyange

== History ==
Established in 1921 as a collective of the Ngweshe Chiefdom within the Belgian Congo, the region was historically occupied by the Lega people, a Bantu-speaking ethnic group residing in the primordial forests of eastern Democratic Republic of the Congo, between the African Great Lakes and the Lualaba River, in proximity to the Luba people.

=== Conflict and insecurity ===
The conflict has devastated the region for nearly 30 years due to recurring wars and persistent ethnic conflicts. In 1996, 2004, 2005, 2006, and on the night of May 26 to 27, 2007, the region experienced several massacres, making it a focal point of ethnic strife. These atrocities perpetuated into various villages within Kaniola groupement in 2008, predominantly attributed to the Alliance des Forces Démocratiques pour la Libération du Congo (AFDL), Rassemblement Congolais pour la Démocratie (RCD), Congrès National pour la Défense du Peuple (CNDP), and Forces Démocratiques de Libération du Rwanda (FDLR). The FDLR, a Rwandan Hutu political-military organization, was instigated in 2000 by the ex-FAR/Interahamwe in Zaire following the Rwandan genocide, aiming to consolidate the Rwandan Hutu refugee population in eastern Zaire to advocate for political dialogue, the formation of political parties, and integration into the army and public institutions.

In May 2009, two officers from the 17th Integrated Brigade Battalion of FARDC were killed and one went missing subsequent to clashes with the FDLR in the Kabona and Luhago villages of the Nindja Chiefdom within the Kabare Territory, located more than 80 kilometers west of Bukavu. By July 2009, the 421st FARDC Battalion successfully reclaimed the villages of Kafukiro and Kahamba from FDLR rebels.

== Economy ==
=== Agriculture ===
Both subsistence and industrial agriculture are an important component of Kaniola's economy. Subsistence agricultural products include bean, maize, sorghum, potato, tomato, banana, sweet potato, cassava, corn and rice. Subsistence farming provides food security for most families and communities but also enables rural producers to increase or decrease their income. As for industrial agriculture commodities, there are cinchona, coffee and tobacco. The subsoil is replete with various minerals, including gold, cassiterite and orphamine.

=== Breeding ===
While agriculture is predominantly for subsistence, livestock is another important source of revenue and plays a significant social role in marriage among the Bashi. It is a source of leverage, prestige and wealth. Animal breeding assists many peasants in solving many of their financial, social, cultural and other problems: marriage, children's education, and visitors' receptions. Breeding mainly centers on cows, goats, sheep, chickens, pigs, rabbits, and guinea pigs.

== See also ==
- Kamanyola
- Kinyandonyi
- Mulenge
- Sange
- Bukavu
- Kabare
