= Kilungutwe River =

Location
- Country: Democratic Republic of the Congo

The Kilungutwe River is a watercourse located in the Mwenga Territory of the South Kivu Province, situated in the eastern part of the Democratic Republic of the Congo (DRC). With an elevation of 882 meters, it functions as a tributary to the Ulindi River. Following the confluence with the Ulindi River approximately 30 km northwest, the Ulindi River proceeds on its course, eventually joining the Congo River. The Kilungutwe River was historically known as the gateway to the jungle from the highlands to the northeast.

The river is a habitat for various species, including catfish, tilapia, and Clarias anguillaris. Further downstream, the Kilungutwe village is rich in biodiversity, with luxuriant vegetation and a diverse range of flora and fauna. The river is also a regional economic component and a substantial water source for irrigation and fishing.

== History ==
The Kilungutwe River has been traditionally occupied by several Bantu ethnicities, including the Lega, Bembe, Shi, Fuliiru, Nyindu, and Vira people.

=== Kasika massacre ===
The Kilungutwe River was a strategic site for Kasika massacre survivors who were subsequently accosted and murdered by the Rally for Congolese Democracy (Rassemblement Congolais pour la Démocratie; RCD), a Rwandan-backed armed group. Many victims were hacked to death with machetes or other sharp objects, with a smaller fraction being shot. Parenthetically, some women were raped before being disemboweled with daggers from their vaginas, with their children being banged on walls and thrown into toilets or along the river.

== See also ==
- Nyindu people
- Lega people
- Bembe people
- Kasika
- Ulindi River
- Mwenga Territory
- Congo River
