= Kasika (village) =

Village in Democratic Republic of the Congo

Coordinates: 2°55′58″S 28°31′47″E

- Village
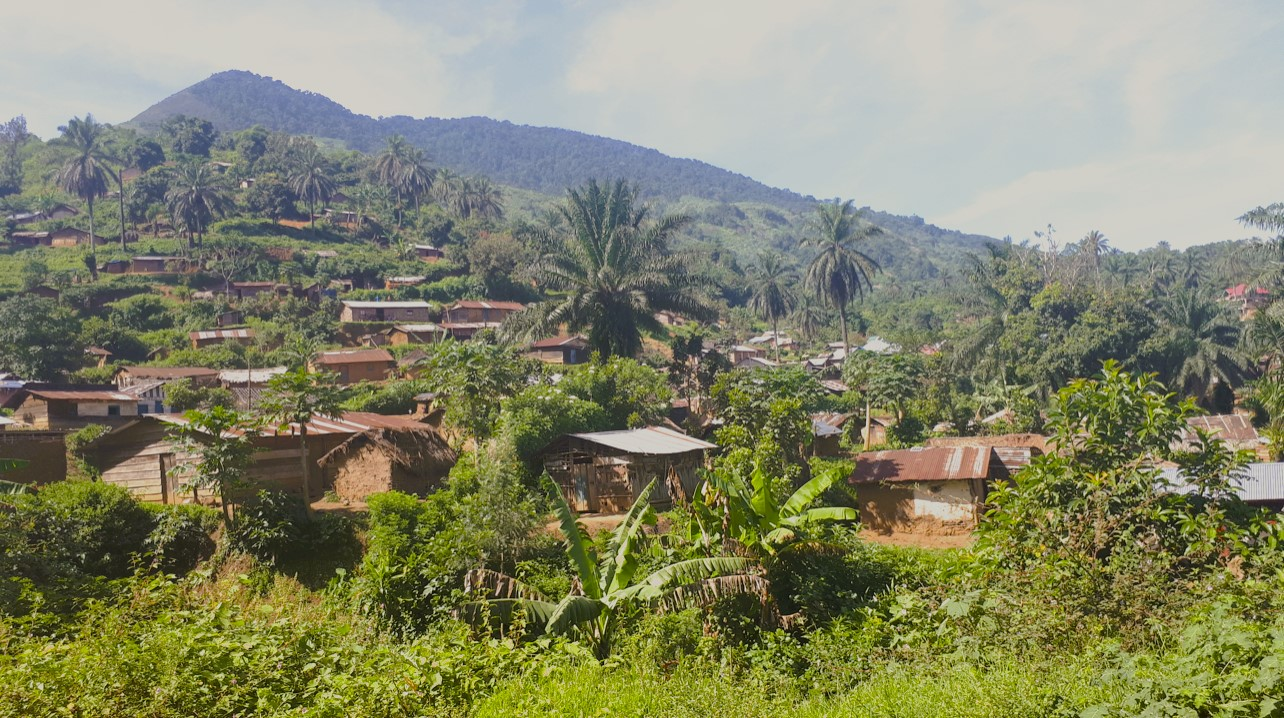
- The view from part of the center of Kasika village in the Luindi Chiefdom, March 2023

- Location within Democratic Republic of the Congo
- Country: Democratic Republic of the Congo
- Province: South Kivu
- Territory: Mwenga
- Chiefdom: Luindi
- Time zone: UTC+2 (CAT)

Kasika is a village located in the Luindi Chiefdom within the Mwenga Territory of the South Kivu Province, situated in the eastern region of the Democratic Republic of the Congo (DRC). Geographically positioned at 965 meters above sea level, Kasika strategically lies near Kihovu and Kahulile, approximately 108 kilometers from Bukavu, near the Rwandan border. The region is more than clusters of mud huts built around a Catholic parish on a hill overlooking a valley. It was the headquarters of the customary chief of the Nyindu ethnic community, whose house and office sat on a hill opposite the parish, a series of large, red-brick structures with cracked ceramic shingles as roofing, laced with vines.

Kasika is one of the most affluent areas of the South Kivu Province, with gold mining being a significant contributor to the village's economy. Incidentally, artisanal gold mining and its trade in the region is the subject of numerous semi-legal and illegal smuggling. As a result, much of the gold mined artisanally in Kasika is smuggled out of the countries, usually to Uganda, but also Kenya, Rwanda, and Burundi, and from there, allegedly in Dubai.

The region is infamous for the Kasika massacre that occurred in 1998 during the Second Congo War, where the Rally for Congolese Democracy, a Rwandan-backed armed group, committed a range of abuses against civilians, including "deliberate killings, arbitrary arrests, and detentions, disappearances, harassment of human rights defenders, abuses against women, and recruitment of child soldiers".

== History ==
According to Daniel P. Biebuyck, a Belgian anthropologist specializing in Central Africa, the region was traditionally occupied by the Nyindu people. By late 1951, the Nyindu people had predominantly established themselves in the Mwenga Territory, with borders adjoining the Shi, the Bembe, and the Lega-Basimwenda. Biebuyck also notes that the region experienced significant population shifts with diverse Bantu ethnicities coexisted in the same village—Nyindu, Lega, Bembe, and Shi—all primarily engaged in agriculture, hunting, trading, and animal husbandry.

=== Kasika massacre ===
On August 24, 1998, amid the Second Congo War, over 1,000 people were killed in Kasika and its nearby villages by Rally for Congolese Democracy (Rassemblement Congolais pour la Démocratie: RCD) and Rwandan soldiers, according to the United Nations. The majority of the corpses found on the 60 km journey from Kilungutwe village and Kilungutwe River to Kasika were mainly women and children. Women were raped before being disemboweled with daggers from the vagina. Over three hundred civilians were massacred in Kasika, including the family of the Mwami (king) of Lwindi Chiefdom François Mubeza III and his disemboweled wife, Yvette Nyanghe, who was pregnant with twins. More than 37 corpses were found in the royal plot alone, including priests, nuns, and several parishioners.

== Economy ==
Agriculture is the backbone of the economy of the Kasika village and the entire Mwenga territory. Cassava, bean, maize and groundnut are among the soil-adapted food crops grown in the village of Kasika in the Mwenga territory in the South Kivu province.

== See also ==
- Kivu conflict
- Kamituga
- Shi
- Lega people
- Lugushwa Mine
- Second Congo War
- Mulenge
- Minembwe
- Kasheke
