= Walungu Territory =

Territory in South Kivu, DR Congo

Walungu Territory Wilaya ya Walungu (Swahili)
- Territory
- Territoire de Walungu
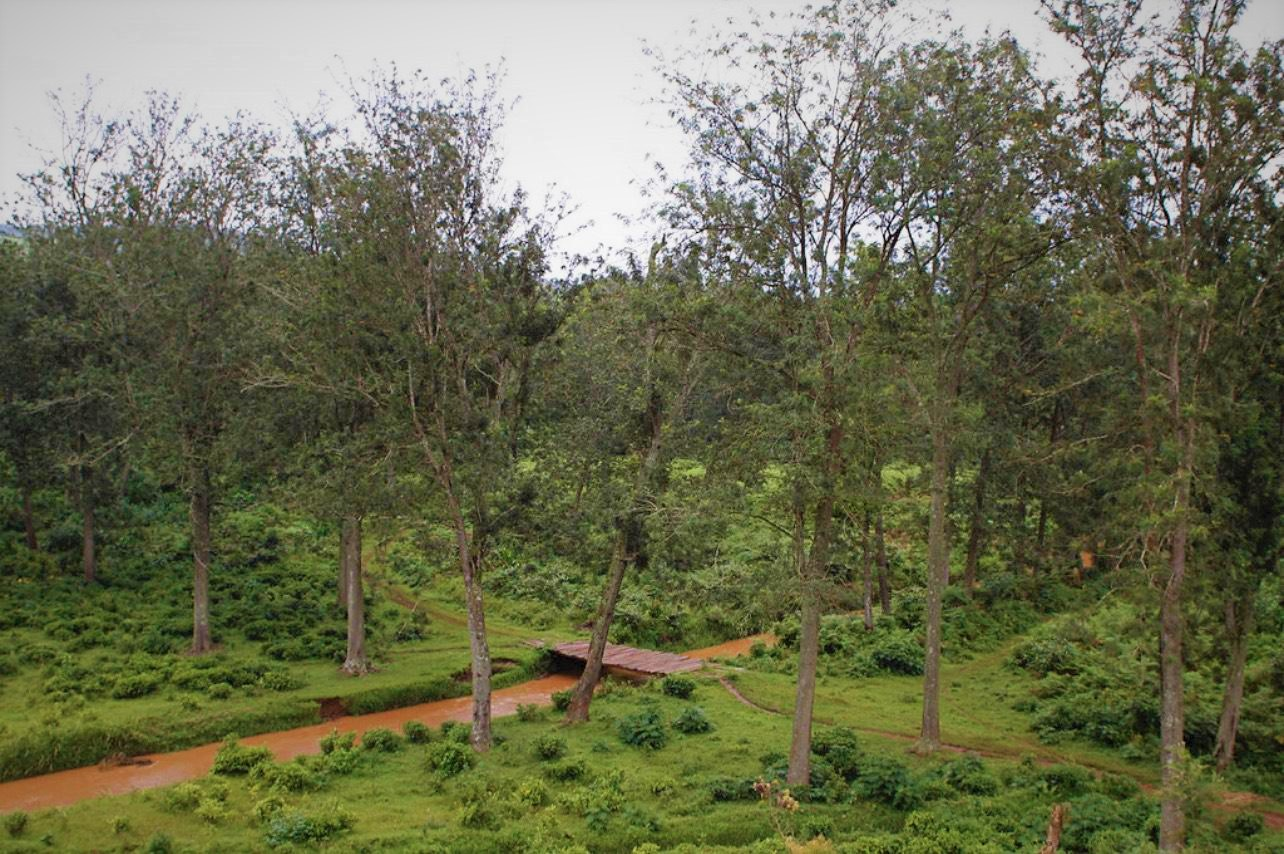
- Interactive map of Walungu Territory
- Coordinates: 2°38′S 28°40′E
- Country: DR Congo
- Province: South Kivu

Area
  - Total: 1,800 km^{2} (690 sq mi)

Population (2018)
  - Total: 716,671
  - Density: 400/km^{2} (1,000/sq mi)
- Time zone: UTC+2 (CAT)
- Official language: French
- National language: Kiswahili

Walungu Territory is a territory located within the South Kivu province in the eastern part of the Democratic Republic of the Congo. Situated approximately 40 km from Bukavu, it shares borders with Kabare Territory to the north, Mwenga Territory to the south, Uvira Territory and the Ruzizi River, as well as the Republics of Rwanda and Burundi to the east, and Shabunda Territory and part of Kabare Territory to the west. According to the 2018 national census, the region has a population of 716,671, with 672,436 residing in the Ngweshe Chiefdom and 44,235 in the Kaziba Chiefdom. Spanning an area of 1,800 km^{2}, Walungu Territory has a population density of 398 inhabitants per square kilometer.

Mashi is the most widely spoken language, while French serves as the official language and Kiswahili functions as a national lingua franca. Walungu Territory is considered an important agricultural center in South Kivu, with an economy based on subsistence and industrial farming, livestock breeding, trade, artisanal crafts such as cutting and sewing, carpentry, electronic repairs, and small-scale industries including sawmills, brickyards, and soap production. Mining activities are also significant, although they have contributed to security challenges involving foreign armed groups and local militias, prompting the deployment of United Nations Organization Stabilization Mission in the Democratic Republic of the Congo (MONUSCO) to address human rights violations. On 25 May 2005, the territory was the site of a fatal plane crash when a chartered Maniema Antonov An-28 aircraft operated by Victoria Air crashed into a mountain near Walungu, resulting in the deaths of all 27 people on board.

== Geography ==
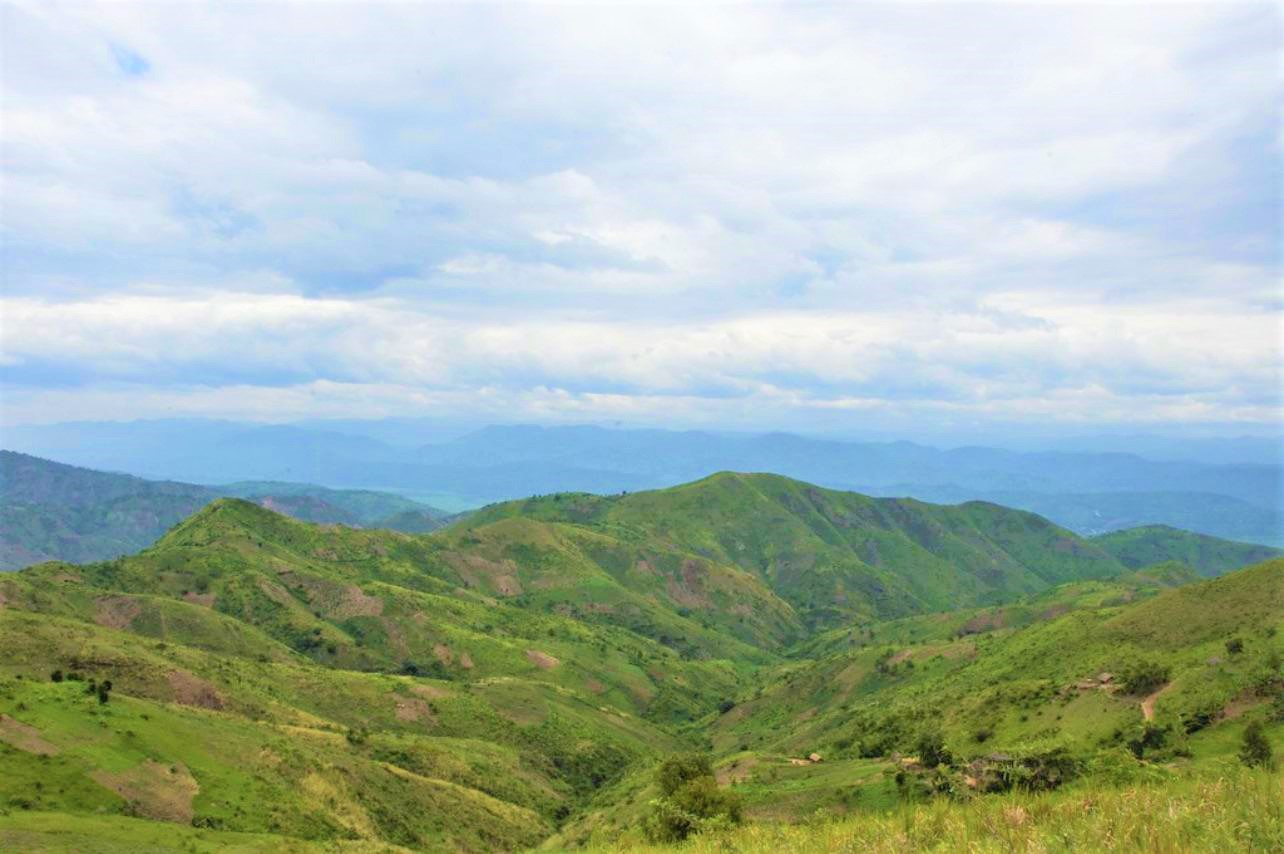
Kamanyola high plateau situated in the Ruzizi Plain within the Ngweshe Chiefdom

Walungu Territory is located in South Kivu Province in the eastern Democratic Republic of the Congo. It lies between longitudes 28.44° E and 28.758° E and latitudes 2.692° S and 2.625° S. The territory spans an area of 1,800 square kilometers and sits at an elevation ranging from 1,000 meters above sea level in Kamanyola to over 3,000 meters in the surrounding highlands. The terrain is highly rugged, characterized by mountain ranges, hills, and marshy peneplains. Roughly half of its terrain is situated within the Ruzizi Plain, a vast lowland in the western section of the East African Rift, specifically the Albertine Rift, positioned between the Mitumba Mountains and the Ruzizi River. The territory is bordered by Kabare Territory to the north, Mwenga Territory to the south, Bafuliiru Chiefdom of Uvira Territory, the Ruzizi River, and the Republics of Rwanda and Burundi to the east, and Shabunda Territory and part of Kabare Territory to the west.

=== Hydrology and environmental challenges ===
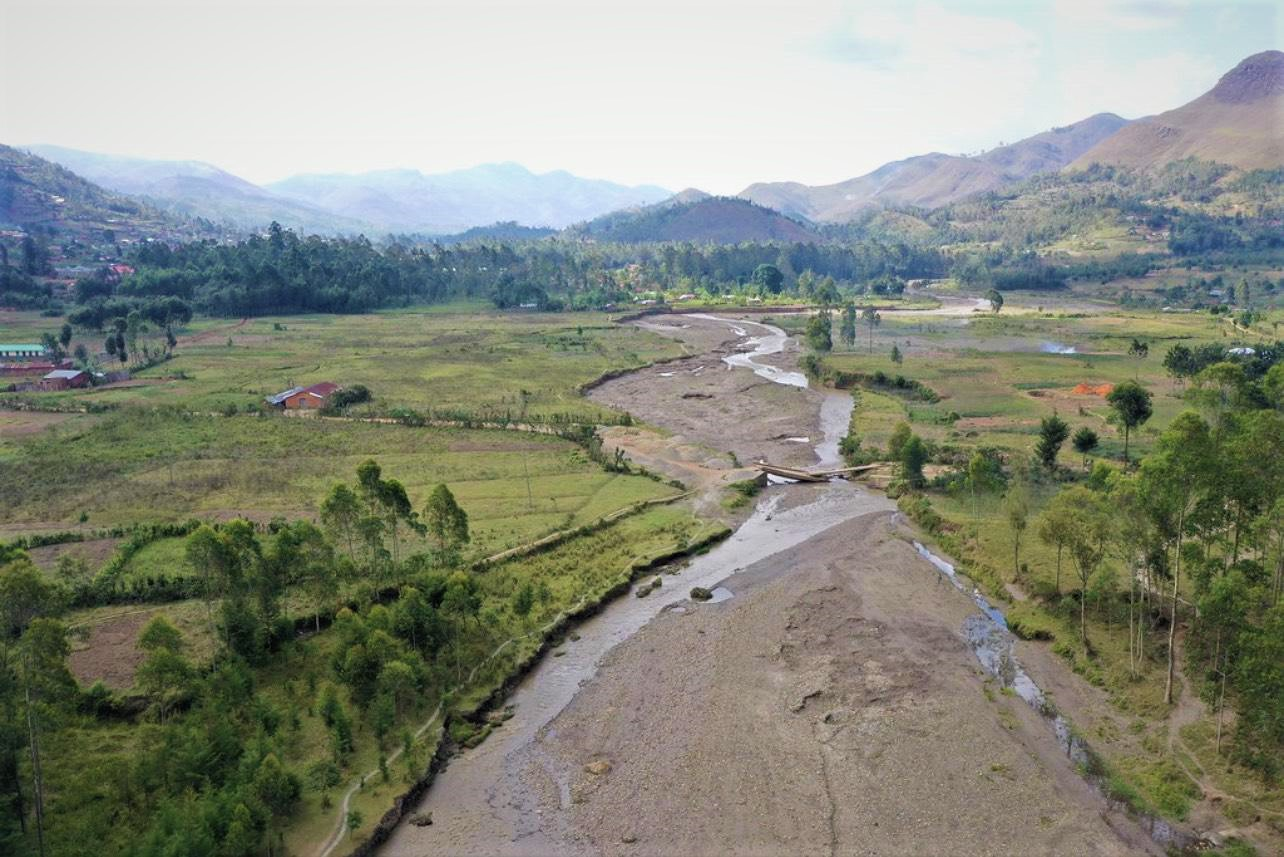
Luzinzi River in August 2019

Hydrologically, Walungu Territory is watered by several rivers, the most significant being the Luvinvi, Ulindi, and Kadubo Rivers, most of which eventually feed into the Ruzizi River. Numerous smaller watercourses, including the Kashanja, Cisheke, and Cidubo Rivers, also traverse the territory, converging into larger rivers such as the Mubimbi and Ulindi. Other notable rivers include Nsesha, Mugaba, Luzinzi, Mayi-Mingi, and Gombo. Additionally, the territory contains a small lake, Lake Mudekera, located in the high mountains of Kaziba Chiefdom, recognized as a tourist site.

Environmental degradation presents a major concern for Walungu Territory. Soil erosion, deforestation of protected sites and watersheds, and the regression of forest cover due to population pressures have significantly reduced the available agricultural land. Erosion, in particular, is identified as the primary factor contributing to the decline in soil productivity, affecting more than half of the territory's households.

=== Vegetation ===
Vegetation consists primarily of grassy savannahs, with scattered woodlands and remnants of forest reserves such as Mugaba and Mushwere. Ngweshe Chiefdom features two primary types of vegetation: natural forests, including those in Kaniola (Lushoze and Mugaba), Tubimbi, and Kabugi, and artificial plantations of eucalyptus, pine, grevillea, cinchona, coffee, and tea trees. Notable plantation areas include Okra, Irabata, Muleke, Cibeke, Isingo, Nduba, and Muzinzi (Kaderhe, Nyangezi). Deforestation has heavily impacted the mountain and hill areas, notably in Businga hills (Nyangezi), Cibeke (Burhale), and the "Mise en garde" escarpment near the Tubimbi Commercial Center, leading to severe soil erosion. In Kaziba Chiefdom, dominant plantations include cypress, eucalyptus, grevillea, and pine trees. The chiefdom also contains altitude forests featuring bamboo and Prunus africana.

=== Soil types and mineral resources ===
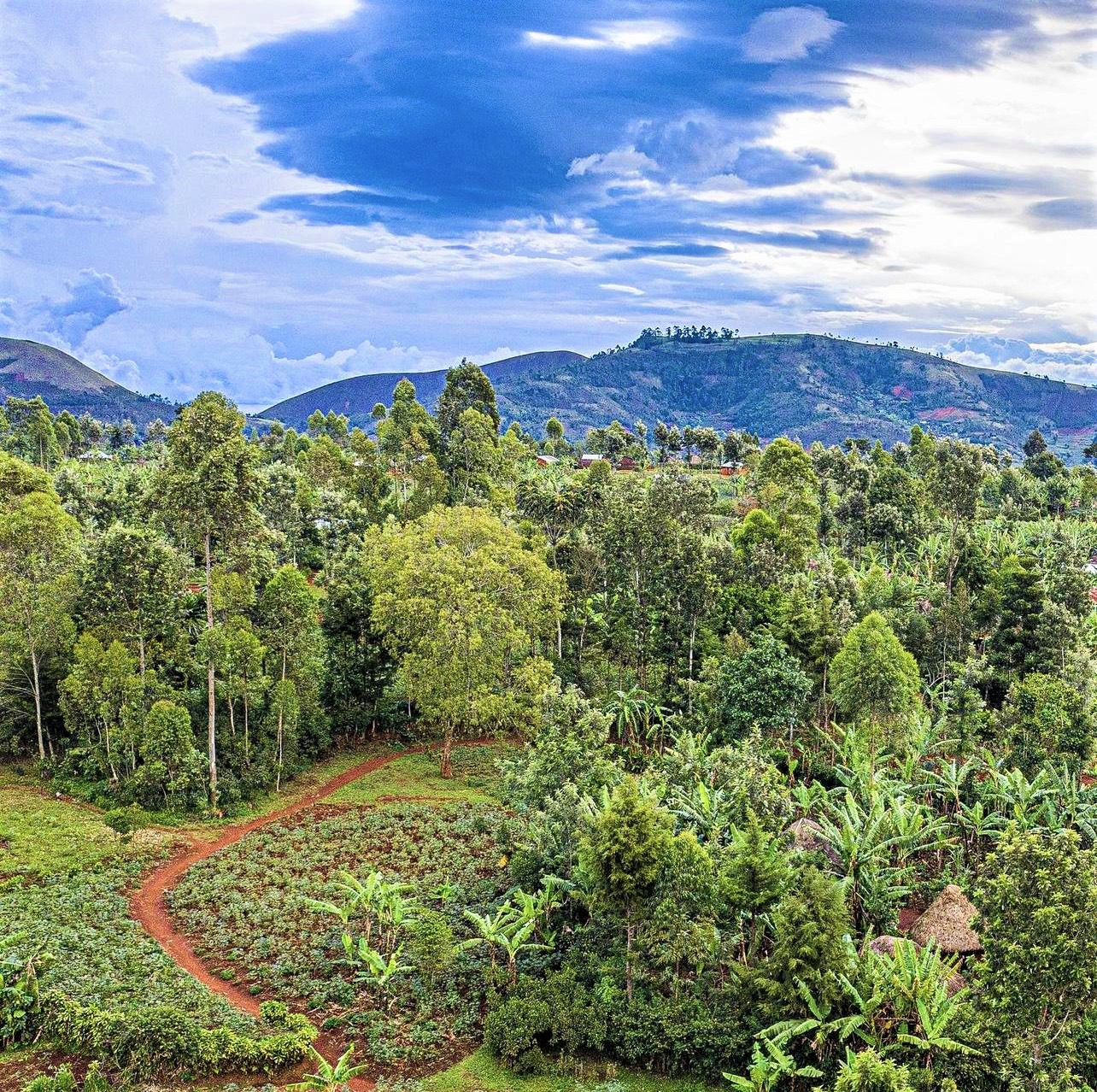
Ngweshe Chiefdom, July 2020

The territory features a complex variety of soils, with ferralsols being the most dominant. These soils, considered transitional between young soils and ancient ferralsols, are classified as humic nitisols, noted for their high carbon content, low base saturation, and acidic pH ranging from 4.5 to 5. They are highly susceptible to erosion, presenting limitations for agricultural activities. Other soil types include clayey-sandy red laterite soils, loose black soils, stony soils, and alluvial soils in the marshlands. Soils in Ngweshe Chiefdom are predominantly clayey and increasingly degraded due to erosion and population pressure. Clayey-sandy soils originating from basaltic rocks are common, particularly in areas with thick, compact layers rich in clay.

Walungu Territory's subsoil is rich in mineral resources, including gold, cassiterite, coltan, wolframite, and iron, much of it unexploited. Some of these deposits were previously mined by the Société Minière et Industrielle du Kivu (SOMINKI), particularly around Luntukulu in the Mulamba groupement.

=== Climate ===
Walungu Territory experiences a cold tropical lowland climate, with altitudes ranging from approximately 1,000 meters at Kamanyola in the east to about 2,000 meters at Mulumemunene. The region features two distinct seasons: a dry season from May to September and a rainy season from September to May. Temperatures range from an average of 17°C in July to approximately 20°C in October. Annual rainfall varies between 900 mm and 1,500 mm, with an average of 1,300 mm. Owing to its mountainous setting within the Mitumba massif, Walungu Territory enjoys a mild and relatively dry climate typical of high-altitude environments.

=== Administrative division ===
Walungu Territory is administratively divided into two chiefdoms (chefferies): Ngweshe and Kaziba, which are further subdivided into groupements (groups) and localités (villages). Each chiefdom is led by a traditional chief (mwami, plural bami), who presides over customary authority, succession practices, and the preservation of local traditions. While the customary chiefs work in coordination with the Territorial Administrator, they retain a degree of autonomy in their internal affairs.

At the intermediate level, each groupement is headed by a chef de groupement, typically a member of the royal lineage. Recognition of a chef de groupement is granted by order of the Minister of the Interior and Security, Decentralization, and Customary Affairs, with installation carried out by the Territorial Administrator or the Mayor in the presence of the chiefdom's mwami. At the local level, village chiefs (chefs de village) oversee administrative tasks such as population censuses, public health, and civil registration, including declarations of births, deaths, and marriages. They are recognized by decision of the Territorial Administrator and installed by the chef de groupement in the presence of the mwami. In incorporated groupements, however, village chiefs are recognized by the Mayor. Village chiefs operate under the administrative authority of their respective chef de groupement.

No	Chiefdoms	Total area	Chief town	Groupements
1.	Ngweshe Chiefdom	1,599 km^{2}	Musunda	1. Burhale
				2. Ikkoma
3. Irongo
4. Izege
5. Kamanyola
6. Kamisimbi
7. Kaniola-Kanyola
8. Karhongo
9. Lubona
10. Luchiga
11. Lurhala
12. Mulamba
13. Mushinga
14. Nduba
15. Rubimbi
16. Walungu
2.	Kaziba Chiefdom	195 km^{2}	Lwanguku	1. Bulumbwe
				2. Butuza
3. Chibanda
4. Chihumba
5. Chirimiro
6. Kabembe
7. Kahungwe
8. Kashanga
9. Kashozi
10. Chiburhi/Ciburhi
11. Lukube
12. Muchingwa
13. Muhumba
14. Mulambi
15. Ngando

== Demographics ==
=== Population ===
According to the 2011 census, the Ngweshe Chiefdom alone recorded a population of 601,306 inhabitants. By 2016, the figure had been revised to 456,660 residents, with a population density surpassing 250 inhabitants per square kilometer. This makes Ngweshe one of the most densely populated areas in the Democratic Republic of the Congo. Population growth has been particularly rapid, doubling within a span of 27 years, exerting significant pressure on the territory's limited land resources and social infrastructure. The 2018 annual report for Walungu Territory estimated the total population at 716,671 inhabitants, with 672,436 residing in Ngweshe Chiefdom and 44,235 in Kaziba Chiefdom. In Ngweshe, the majority population consists of the Bashi, alongside smaller communities such as the Barega, Bafuliiru, and Bavira. The area has also attracted increasing numbers of other ethnic groups, particularly around mining sites, as well as Rwandan refugees, whose mobility throughout eastern Congo complicates accurate population estimates. In Kaziba Chiefdom, the Bashi also constitute the majority, complemented by other ethnic groups, including the Bafuliiru, Barega, Banyindu, Babembe, and Banyamulenge.

Linguistically, Mashi is the most widely spoken local language, while French serves as the official language used in administration and formal education. Kiswahili is the national lingua franca extensively used in formal and informal settings to facilitate communication among the territory's heterogeneous population.

=== Religion ===
Christianity is dominant, with more than 90% of the population adhering to Catholic, Protestant, or Kimbanguist denominations. Catholic evangelization began in 1906 in Nyangezi, within the Karhongo groupement, which marked the establishment of South Kivu's first Catholic parish, followed by Burhale in 1921. Early missionary efforts sought to suppress animist traditions, including veneration of the deity Lyangombe, and replaced them with Christian teachings often conveyed in Romance languages unfamiliar to the local population. While this process of de-acculturation reshaped local customs, the influence of Christian missions is commonly acknowledged as formative in developing local leadership and institutions. Christian organizations continue to operate a broad network of schools, hospitals, clinics, and charitable associations. Islam was introduced more recently, during the United Nations Mission in the Democratic Republic of the Congo (MONUC), when Pakistani and Egyptian peacekeepers converted several Bashi communities.

== History ==
Walungu Territory was officially created by Presidential Decree No. 65-221 on 3 May 1967, and it was further amended by Decree No. 82-006 on 25 February 1982.

=== Conflict and insecurity ===
==== Kwilu Rebellion and First Congo War ====
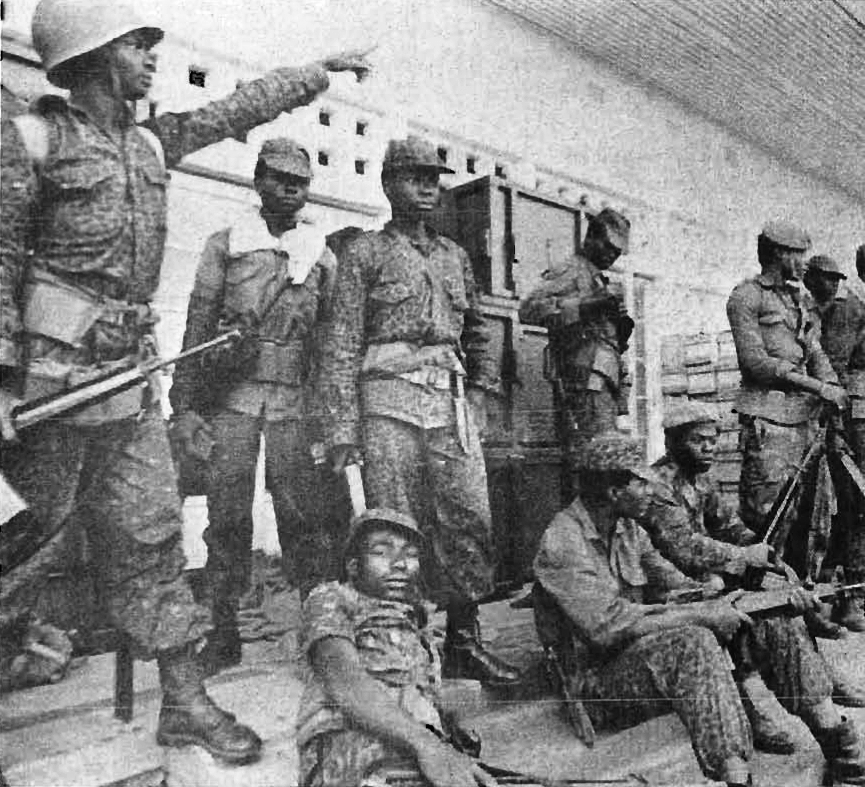
Kamanyola Division during Shaba I in April 1977

Walungu Territory has a tumultuous history marked by conflict and insecurity, stemming from a combination of internal and external factors. In the late 1960s, the region played a significant role during the Mulelist insurgency, where the Armée Nationale Congolaise (ANC) achieved a key victory against the insurgency. During the First Congo War from 1996 to 1997, the region became a battleground due to its strategic location and access to valuable resources. The conflict involved multiple armed groups, including the Alliance of Democratic Forces for the Liberation of Congo-Zaire (AFDL), Rwandan Patriotic Army (RPA), and Forces Armées Burundaises (FAB). The AFDL, led by Laurent-Désiré Kabila, emerged as a rebel movement aiming to overthrow the regime of President Mobutu Sese Seko in Zaire. The AFDL received significant support from RPA, led by Paul Kagame, due to concerns about the presence of Rwandan Hutu militias in eastern Zaire. However, reports, including those from the United Nations Security Council, also implicated the AFDL and its allies in massacres and the systematic looting of Zaire's mineral wealth.

In 1996, Walungu Territory was home to a large number of refugee camps as part of the broader "Bukavu camps" network, which housed an estimated 307,499 refugees across Walungu, Kabare, and Kalehe territories. These camps sheltered Rwandan and Burundian refugees who had fled previous conflicts. As the AFDL-RPA troops advanced towards Bukavu, they targeted these camps, often with brutal tactics. On 20 October 1996, AFDL-RPA forces attacked the Kamanyola refugee camp in Walungu Territory, killing an unknown number of refugees and Zairean civilians, with bodies reportedly dumped into pit latrines. On 21 October, AFDL-RPA units executed refugees at Nyarubale in the Kalunga hills as they attempted to flee towards Bukavu. Those who failed Swahili language tests or had Rwandan or Burundian accents were systematically executed. On 26 October, fleeing refugees were ambushed between Nyantende and Walungu-Centre, with 200 to 600 people killed, most of them women, children, and the elderly. On 28 October 1996, five refugees were executed by AFDL-RPA forces in Lwakabiri, west of Bukavu. Following the fall of Bukavu on 29 October, AFDL-RPA forces continued targeting refugee camps to the north, including Kashusha and INERA. On 2 November, a large-scale attack on Kashusha/INERA camp left hundreds of refugees dead. Later, on 22 November, AFDL-RPA troops massacred between 500 and 800 refugees at Chimanga camp after deceiving them with promises of food and repatriation. In early 1997, similar atrocities continued, with reports of torture and executions along the Bukavu-Walungu road. Refugees were often arrested, tortured, and then killed, sometimes with knives.

==== Second Congo War ====
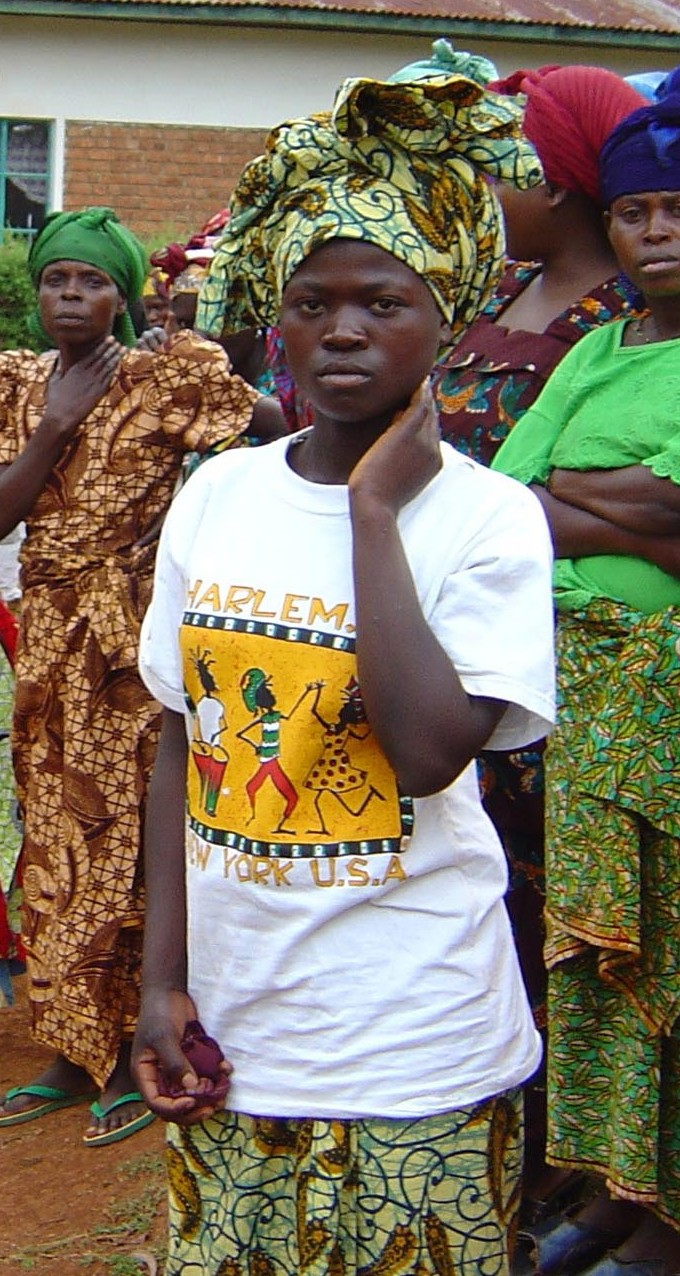
Rape survivor near Walungu

The outbreak of the Second Congo War plunged Walungu Territory into further turmoil. The conflict began when Laurent-Désiré Kabila, who had seized power from Mobutu, clashed with his former Rwandan and Ugandan allies. Tensions arose as Kabila was accused of marginalizing Tutsi factions in his government while favoring his Katangan allies. Allegations also surfaced that the United States provided military assistance to Rwanda before the conflict, reportedly to secure access to the DRC's rich natural resources. A U.S. Army Rwanda Interagency Assessment Team (RIAT) was deployed in July 1998 to train Rwandan military units. Some reports, including those by war correspondent Keith Harmon Snow, implicated U.S. figures such as Roger Winter of the U.S. Committee for Refugees and Immigrants in supporting insurgencies. In July 1998, Kabila, fearing a coup d'état, dismissed Rwandan General James Kabarebe as Chief of Staff of the Congolese army and ordered all RPA soldiers to withdraw from Congolese territory. This decision infuriated Rwanda and Uganda, prompting them to support a new rebel faction, the Rassemblement Congolais pour la Démocratie-Goma (RCD-Goma). On 2 August 1998, mutinous Congolese troops allied with Rwanda and Uganda announced their rebellion via Radio-Télévision Nationale Congolaise (RTNC) in Goma. The RCD-Goma, heavily supported by Rwanda, swiftly captured Goma without resistance. The city remained under RCD-Goma and RPA control for nearly three years, from August 1998 to January 2001.

The war was characterized by extreme violence against civilians. On 3 August 1998, at Kavumu Airport near Bukavu, rebel Banyamulenge soldiers and RPA units executed at least 38 Congolese officers and 100 unarmed soldiers, forcing them to lie on the airport runway before their execution. That same month, RCD-Goma and RPA forces launched violent raids in Bukavu, killing, raping, and terrorizing civilians, particularly in Kadutu and Ibanda. Despite its rapid territorial gains, the RCD-Goma struggled to control rural areas due to its Tutsi-dominated leadership, dependence on Rwanda, and violent repression of civilians. Widespread human rights violations, including arbitrary arrests, torture, and forced disappearances, were reported in Bukavu and Uvira between 1998 and 2002, with many detainees transported to Goma, Kisangani, or Rwanda, where they vanished.

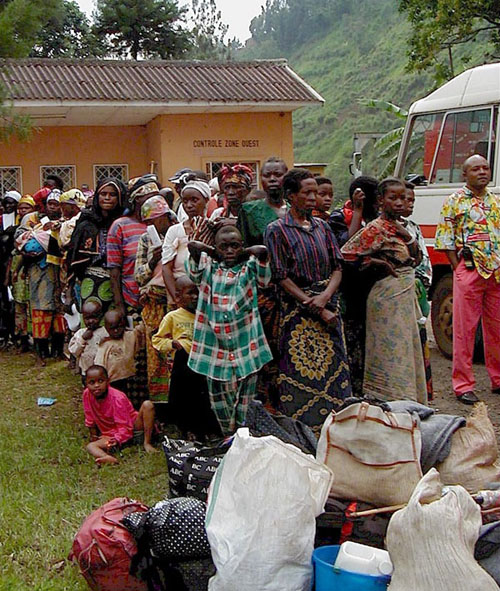
Rape victims who have been successfully reintegrated into their communities assemble in a "peace hut" near Walungu Territory

One of the war's most notorious massacres occurred on 24 August 1998, when RCD-Goma and RPA forces massacred over 1,000 civilians in the villages of Kilungutwe, Kalama, and Kasika in Mwenga Territory, 108 kilometers from Bukavu. The massacre, targeting women, children, and the elderly, was carried out with extreme brutality—women were raped, tortured, and subjected to genital mutilation, while infants and children were thrown into pit latrines. The perpetrators pillaged and set fire to villages before withdrawing. Similar atrocities followed in Kitutu (2 September 1998), Bushaku (21–22 October 1998), and Bitale (19 February 1999). Between December 1998 and January 1999, clashes between RCD-Goma and RPA forces and pro-Kabila militias in Walungu led to heavy civilian casualties. After the assassination of Laurent-Désiré Kabila in January 2001, his successor, Joseph Kabila, initiated peace efforts, including the deployment of the United Nations Mission in the Democratic Republic of Congo (MONUC) observers and negotiations for a ceasefire. However, fighting persisted in many parts of the country, particularly in the eastern provinces. Efforts to reach a political settlement gained momentum with the signing of peace agreements between the DRC and its main foreign adversaries, Rwanda and Uganda, in 2002. The Pretoria Agreement, signed on 30 July 2002, called for the withdrawal of Rwandan troops in exchange for the dismantling of Hutu armed groups linked to the Rwandan genocide. A similar accord with Uganda was signed in Luanda on 6 September, leading to a phased withdrawal of Ugandan forces. These agreements marked a turning point, as they set the stage for broader negotiations involving all major Congolese factions.

Despite the withdrawal of foreign troops, internal conflicts persisted, particularly in North and South Kivu, where Kabila's government—supported by the Mayi-Mayi factions, FDD, and ALiR—battled the ANC (RCD-Goma's armed division) and Rwandan RPA soldiers. In late 2002, senior figures in RCD-Goma sought to consolidate their control by negotiating with the political wing of the Mudundu 40 Mayi-Mayi movement. Led by Odilon Kurhenga Muzimu and Patient Mwendanga, the political faction agreed to collaborate in neutralizing the movement's military wing, which was commanded by Albert Kahasha Murhula (Foka Mike) and had fortified positions in Burhale. However, when the negotiations failed to dismantle the group, RCD-Goma dismissed Mwendanga from his post as Governor of South Kivu in March 2003. This led to a military offensive in Walungu Territory, where ANC forces, backed by Rwandan troops, launched attacks on Mudundu 40 strongholds. Between 5–13 April 2003, ANC and Rwandan forces used heavy weaponry to assault the villages of Mwegerera, Lukumbo, Karhundu, and Izirangabo, resulting in the deaths of dozens of civilians. At least 27 women were raped, six people disappeared, and mass graves were discovered in multiple locations near Walungu. As part of a broader campaign of repression, ANC forces destroyed schools and healthcare facilities in retaliation against the local population for its alleged support of Mudundu 40.

The war officially concluded in 2003 with the signing of the Global and All-Inclusive Agreement, which led to the formation of a transitional government. However, the eastern DRC remained volatile, with numerous armed factions continuing to operate beyond state control.

==== Ongoing conflict ====
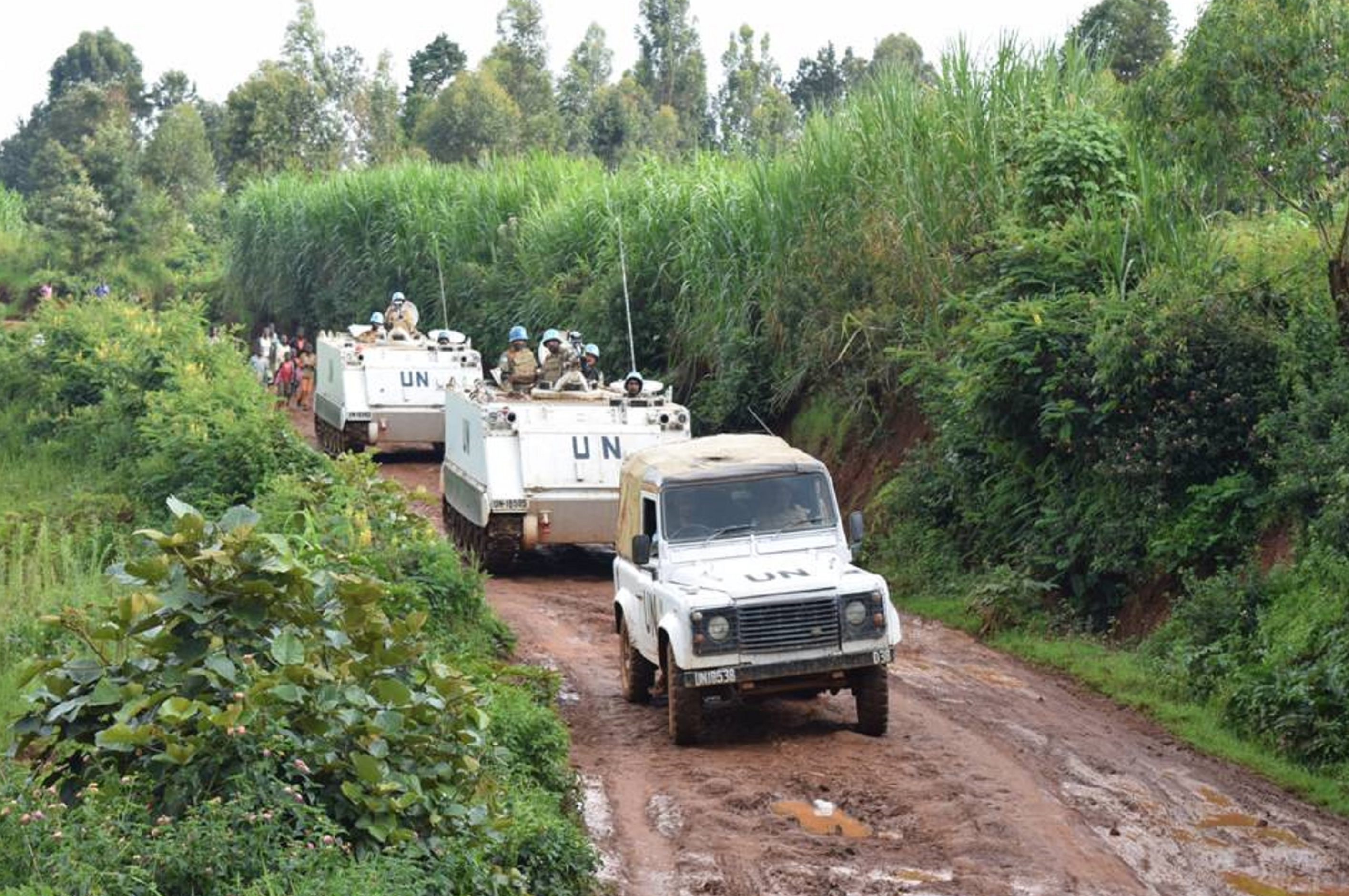
MONUSCO troops in Walungu Territory, March 2016

Since 2003, the region has been plagued by persistent insecurity and conflict due to armed groups like the FDLR (Forces Démocratiques de Libération du Rwanda) and Rasta militia (les Rasta), remnants of Interahamwe, perpetuating violence and instability. The Rasta militia, an ultra-violent armed group composed of approximately fifteen Congolese dissidents, emerged in the region and was responsible for several brutal massacres, most notably in the Nindja Chiefdom and Kaniola groupement between 2004 and 2007.

Another source of ongoing conflict is the traditional power struggle and the presence of vigilance committees; armed groups formed to protect local communities. Nonetheless, their presence has also generated internal tensions and conflicts. The head of the Ngweshe Chiefdom's decision to depose the leader of the Kaniola groupement without providing a justifiable reason fueled tensions. This expulsion, coupled with the existence of armed vigilance committees and the popularity of Foka Mike, a local figure, further aggravated the power struggle and accusations of militancy. Civil society in Kaniola and other parts of the region has voiced grievances against the chieftaincy chief, accusing him of lacking transparency and disregarding the demands and expectations of local populations. Parenthetically, the issue of access to land has become a severe source of insecurity. The competition between customary land practices and formal land law has created conflicts over land management and access. Customary land rights, often precarious and unprotected, leave many farmers susceptible to dispossession and exploitation by influential private individuals who convert large portions of land into private plantations. This plight has exacerbated land inequalities, as small-scale producers are constrained to rent land from large landowners under insecure oral agreements.

== Economy ==
Agriculture is the primary source of livelihood for the population. The principal staple crops include cassava, bananas, beans, soybeans, maize, sorghum, taro, yams, peas, potatoes, and sweet potatoes. Banana cultivation is widespread across the territory and occupies up to 70% of the arable land, and is often intercropped with beans, sorghum, and other crops, though it is increasingly threatened by infestations of Cosmopolites sordidus (banana weevils). The most common variety grown is banana beer, which is used to produce the local fermented beverage kasikisi (or Kasiksi), especially in Bushi, where it is considered almost a staple food. It is also used to produce dough mixed with cassava flour during times of food shortage. Sweet potato is generally regarded as a famine-reserve crop, but like other food crops, its expansion is limited by the scarcity of arable land. Potatoes, which are better adapted to high-altitude conditions, offer higher economic returns due to their shorter growing cycle and ability to be cultivated multiple times per year, unlike cassava, which requires 12 to 18 months. However, potatoes are not widely consumed as part of the local diet. Soybeans play an important role in combating kwashiorkor by serving as a substitute for animal protein, though seed shortages often occur at the start of each planting season due to limited storage practices. Introduced in the 1970s, soybean cultivation has steadily expanded. Sorghum is primarily cultivated for the production of kasikisi and has historically helped improve nutrition among local households.

The territory's ecological conditions, particularly in the high-altitude marshlands and the Ruzizi Plain, are generally highly conducive to market gardening and horticultural activities.

In addition to subsistence agriculture, commercial and industrial crops such as tea, cinchona (quinine), and coffee were once significant; however, these have largely been abandoned in recent years. This decline is primarily attributed to a pervasive insecurity problems, which has compelled many farmers to flee their lands. Compounding this issue, the global financial crisis disrupted agricultural investments, which then resulted in suspended funding and the closure of processing facilities.

Livestock farming, including large and small ruminants, is prevalent, rooted in the traditions of the Shi people, who are historically an agropastoralist community. However, this sector has suffered a sharp decline, largely due to the systematic looting and destruction perpetrated by armed groups between 1996 and 2006. This devastation has been worsened by insufficient support from technical administrative services and a lack of intervention from qualified non-governmental organizations, leading to alarmingly high mortality rates among livestock. Data from the veterinary service of Walungu Territory in 2000 reveals a dramatic decline: from 36,834 head of cattle in 1960 to only 8,893 in 2000—a 76% reduction over four decades.

The territory is relatively under-endowed in mineral resources, though artisanal mining of gold, cassiterite, coltan, and wolframite is practiced. There is no industrial-scale exploitation, and due to the lack of organizational structures among artisanal miners, this sector contributes little to local socio-economic development, while gold extraction has often intensified armed conflicts.

The region suffers from acute environmental degradation, driven by soil erosion, deforestation of protected areas and watersheds, and forest regression due to demographic pressure. These dynamics have led to a significant reduction in arable land available for household use. Soil erosion, in particular, is identified as the leading cause of declining land productivity, currently impacting more than 70% of households in Ngweshe Chiefdom.

== Government ==
Walungu Territory is administered by a Territorial Administrator, who serves as the official representative of the State and the Province within the jurisdiction. The Administrator is assisted by two Assistant Territorial Administrators, all of whom are appointed and, when necessary, dismissed by the President of the Republic upon the recommendation of the Minister of Internal Affairs. Their assignment is formalized by order of the Minister of Internal Affairs on the proposal of the Provincial Governor, under whose authority they operate. The Administrator is tasked with overseeing public services, making administrative decisions, and, through delegated powers from the Governor, managing decentralized territorial entities and provide support in the implementation of their responsibilities, relying on state and provincial public services. The Territorial Administrator and the Assistant Administrators also hold the status of judicial police officers with general jurisdiction.
