= Luindi Chiefdom =

Chiefdom in Mwenga Territory, South Kivu, DRC

- Chiefdom
- Chefferie de Luindi
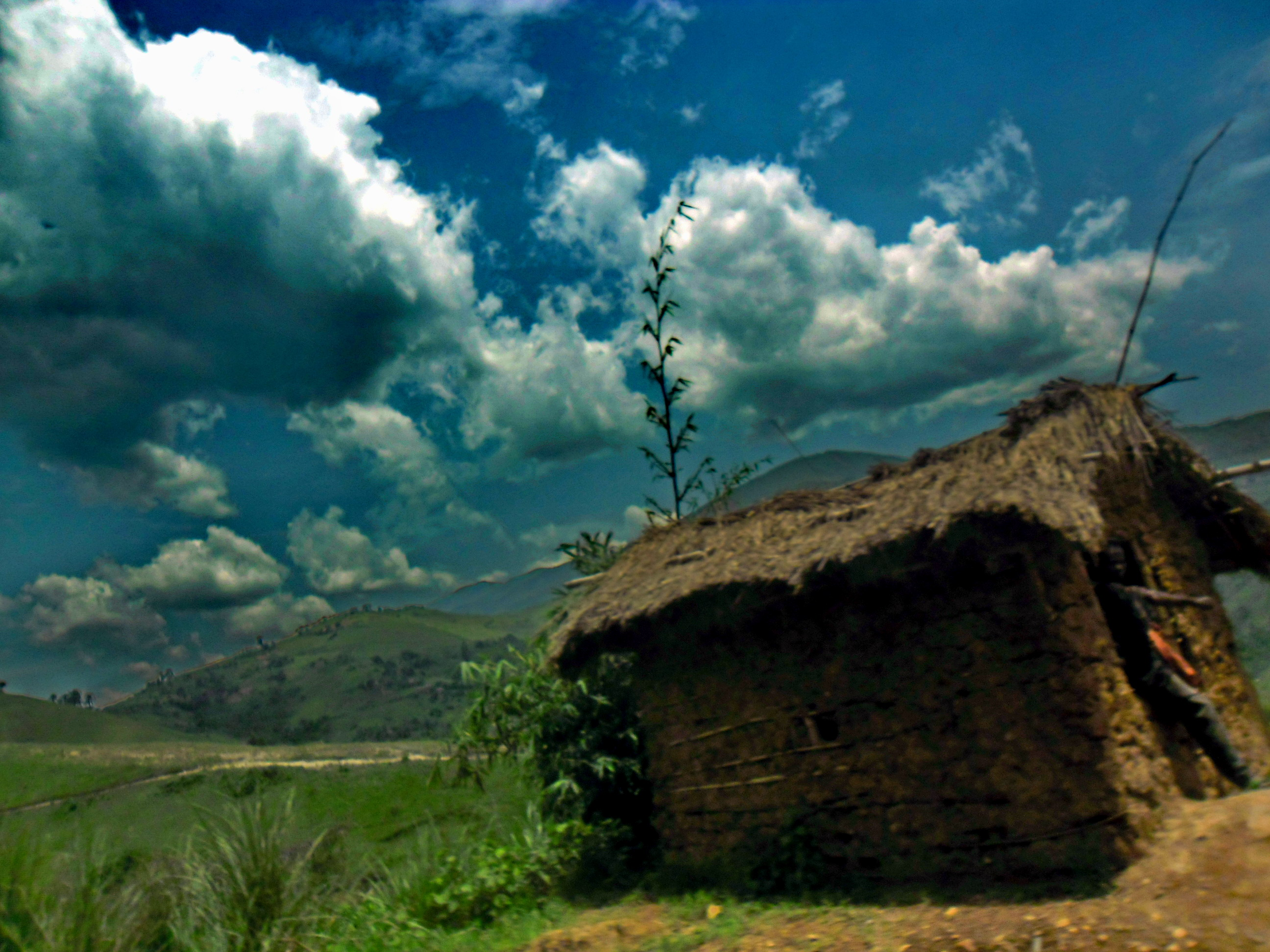
- A hut on the side of the mountain road to Burhale–Mwenga, at 6,500 feet above sea level
- Country: Democratic Republic of the Congo
- Province: South Kivu
- Territory: Mwenga
- Chief town: Kasika

Government
  - Mwami: Nyumba Bugoma Bubeza IV

Area
  - Total: 856 km^{2} (331 sq mi)

Population (2019 est)
  - Total: 43,566
- Time zone: UTC+2 (CAT)
- Official language: French
- National language: Kiswahili

The Luindi Chiefdom (French: Chefferie de Luindi), also known as the Lwindi Chiefdom (French: Chefferie de Lwindi), is a chiefdom located in Mwenga Territory, within the South Kivu province in the eastern region of the Democratic Republic of the Congo. Covering an area of 856 square kilometers and with an estimated population of 43,566 as of 2019, it is situated in the mountainous area of the Itombwe Massif.

The Nyindu people form the predominant population of the chiefdom. The Lwindi Chiefdom is subdivided into groupements, which are further subdivided into villages.

== Administration and governance ==
The Luindi Chiefdom is governed by a mwami, who exercises customary and statutory powers and is selected according to local traditions. He is supported by three Chief Aldermen (notables), who assist him with administrative duties. The chiefdom has two administrative bodies:

- The Chiefdom Council is the deliberative body and consists of councillors elected by direct, secret universal suffrage under national electoral law. Its members receive remuneration. A bureau consisting of a president, a vice-president, and a rapporteur leads the council. These officers are elected under internal regulations that also address fair representation, including gender.
- The Chiefdom Executive College manages the chiefdom's daily affairs and implements the council's decisions. It consists of the mwami and three aldermen chosen for their competence, integrity, and representativeness, with the council's approval. Although the mwami is not personally accountable to the council, his decisions take legal effect only when countersigned by an alderman, who assumes responsibility before the council. If the mwami dies, resigns, becomes incapacitated, or is legally disqualified, the aldermen collectively administer the chiefdom until a successor is appointed. During a temporary absence, the presiding alderman serves as acting leader.

The chiefdom is subdivided into groupements (groupings), each governed by a chef de groupement, who acts as the direct representative of the mwami. These groupements are also divided into localités (villages), each headed by a chef de village, also appointed according to customary practices. In total, the Luindi Chiefdom is composed of eight groupements:

No.	Groupements	Population	Chief	Ruling clan	Other clans	Localities (localités)
1.	Kalambi	7,645	Itongwa Kasuli Nakalambi	Batumba	Bagezi, Balambo, Bashitabale, Basele, Bashimwenda	Kakangala, Itumba, Kalimoto, Kalambi
2.	Kigogo	6,645	Baguma Mwati Kigogo	Benemutalwa	Bashinda, Balambo, Balande, Balizi, Basimbi, Batwa	Muhuzi, Kashindaba, Kadete, Ishungwe, Kadita, Muhembeje
3.	Kilimbwe	3,561	Kabumbanyungu Lusenda	Balande	Babulinzi, Balambo, Balimbizi, Bamulinda, Batwa	Kilimbwe, Matembu, Ishongo, Katembu, Kisogo
4.	Kiomvu	3,090	Kisongo Gaston	Bakyoka	Balobola, Batumba, Bakyoka, Bagezi, Balimbizi	Kiomvu, Ngenga, Lutambi, Kalimoto
5.	Ihanga	2,922	Pierre Mulindwa	Bahofa	Batumba, Bashi, Babulinzi, Bahofa, Bawanda	Lukunga, Butongo, Nyakalenge, Kangola, Chowe, Misela, Kibuti, Malangi
6.	Irangi	5,868	Nyirangi Bulambo Palamibo	Banyamuganga	Bagezi, Bakyoka, Batumba, Banamuganga, Bashimwenda	Kataraka, Ilolo, Ngole, Kabukimba, Kitale, Ilibo, Mulole
7.	Ilowe	1,183	Mulamba Mulate Kilande	Balande	Balambo, Balande, Bashinda, Banamuganga, Bamulinda	Ilowe I, Ilowe II, Nyabaleke, Kishele
8.	Mukangala	12,652	Mwenebatende Nabuhombya Joseph	Bahofa	Batumba, Balande, Basimbi, Banamuganga, Babulinji, Basele, Bamulinda, Bahofa	Kasika, Pinga, Mulamba (Kalizi), Kipinda, Muhimbili, Pinga, Mushinga, Kalemba, Kuhulile, Ngendje, Ilemb
	Total	43,566				

Source: Administrative archives of Luindi Chiefdom, rapport annuel de la Chefferie de Lwindi, 2019.

Historically, the mwami's authority has been based on monarchy and initiation traditions, with its early origins recounted in myths and legends. According to local accounts, Data wa Nyabatwa founded the kingdom around 1620. He had traveled from Mukuju toward Kalungu to a visit named Nakabumbano, where the ruler yielded his throne to him during rainfall. Data wa Nyabatwa then proclaimed himself king, declaring: "Nyi'tolera bwani bwami" ("I have picked up my kingdom"), and this event, according to Congolese researcher Alexandre Mukamba Mulungula, marked the founding of Luindi's Batumba dynasty.

The designation of kings is the prerogative of the Benenamishungwe Kalazambango, a small lineage of the Bashimbi of Luindi. They are assisted by the Banyamuganga, guardians of the royal insignia, who carry the title bagingi in Kinyindu, meaning "wise men". One of the most important insignia is the ishungwe, a cap made of leopard or lion skin, inlaid with bones of deceased kings and dangerous animals such as lions, gorillas, and leopards. This cap symbolizes continuity with past rulers and was traditionally worn only by the batambu (groupement chiefs) and the mwami.

After the death of the mwami, the ruling Batumba family designates a successor in consultation with nabulizi, the elder of the ethnic group, and nashimbi, whose agreement is sought before enthronement. The chiefdom's dignitaries hold political and customary roles at different levels. The mutambo is the customary chief of a groupement, while the mugula heads a localité. The changalume serves as a soldier or policeman responsible for security and enforcement. The mwambali wa mwami is the mwami’s bodyguard and personal attendant.

== History ==
An extensive body of literature indicates that it was from Lwindi that the descendants of NaLwindi dispersed in several directions to establish kingdoms along the western shores of Lake Kivu. NaLwindi ruled both banks of the Lwindi River and had one son, Ndambwe, and two daughters, Lukabura Engasha (Nyalumpongo) and Namuhoye. According to Father Pierre Colle, NaLwindi expelled Lukabura Engasha after she became pregnant. She later returned to her father's household and gave birth to a boy. After her death, Namuhoye raised the child, who married her when he reached adulthood. They had seven sons: Kalunzi, Cinda, Nnarhana, Nnaninja, Muganga, Cilembekwa-Kabare, and Nalwanda.

According to Jean Omasombo Tshonda et al., these seven sons set out to conquer Rwanda and Bushi and became chiefs along the western shores of Lake Kivu, ruling Bushi (Na Bushi), Nindja (Na Nindja), Burhinyi (Na Burhinyi), and other areas. The youngest son, Nalwanda, received no land, so he left his brother Na Bushi and traveled east toward Kihinga, crossing the Ruzizi River with his family and cattle. Like his brother in Bushi, he brought several local tribes under his authority. He expelled the Bahavu, forcing them westward across the lake to seek grazing land in Bahunde territory. These settlement accounts conflict with the oral tradition about the rise of the Baluzi dynasty in Bushi, which also traces its origins to Lwindi and describes its later rule over the Shi.

== Economy ==
The economy depends mainly on agriculture, as does much of rural South Kivu, where more than two-thirds of residents rely on farming. Farmers mainly use traditional methods, including slash-and-burn cultivation. Households cultivate an average of 0.26 hectares during the main agricultural season (kilimo). The main subsistence crops are cassava, bananas, groundnuts, maize, beans, and yams. Farmers also grow smaller quantities of avocados, guavas, lemons, and pineapples. Oil palm is an important industrial crop, and palm products provide residents' main source of cash income.

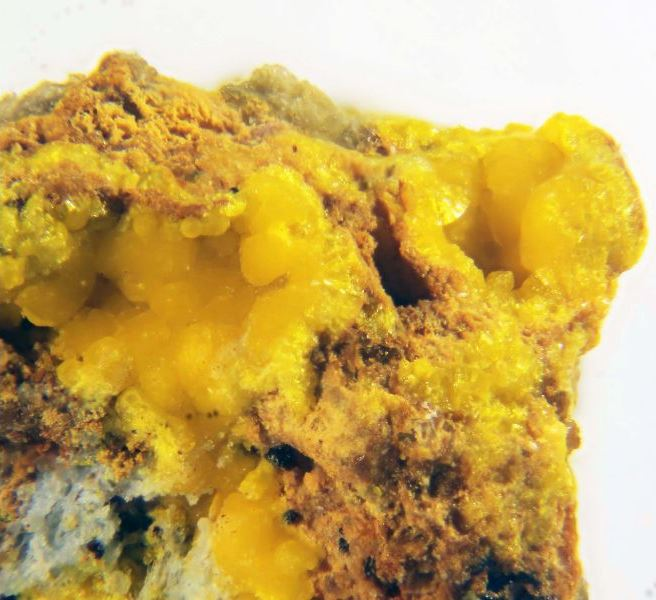
Deep yellow microcrystals of the extremely rare Al–U mineral ranunculite from its type locality and only confirmed occurrence worldwide, the Kobokobo Pegmatite, Mwenga Territory

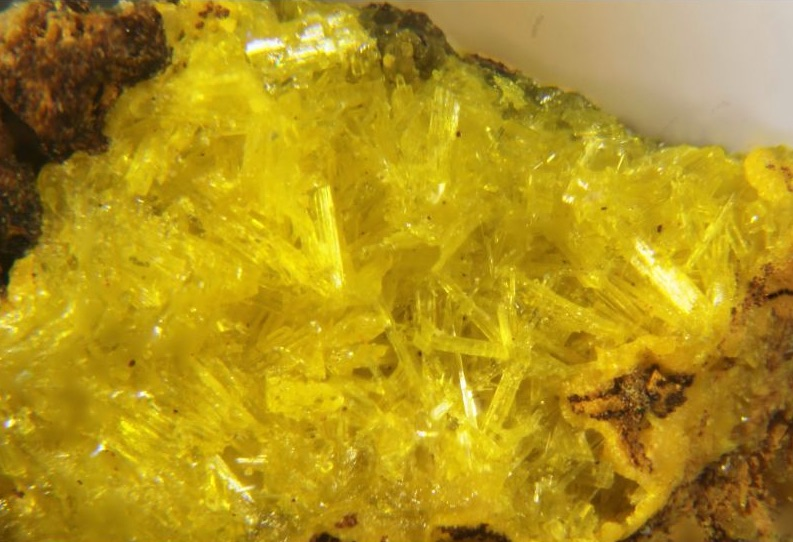
Yellow crystals of the very rare uranium mineral phuralumite from its type locality and only confirmed occurrence worldwide, the Kobokobo Pegmatite, Mwenga Territory

Households commonly raise pigs, goats, sheep, chickens, ducks, and pigeons. Fishing is small-scale and mainly uses lines, with most catches consumed by households. Small quantities are occasionally sold locally to buy flour or cover minor expenses. Rivers within and around Luindi Chiefdom are well stocked with fish, but commercial fishing remains limited.

Commerce mainly consists of small-scale rural trade. The main outlet is the Limanga rural market in the Irangi groupement, which lacks permanent structures or formal organization. Traders mainly sell local foodstuffs and a few manufactured goods. Other major trading centers include Kidasa, Mulamba, and Mukasa in the Mukangala groupement. Some Mukangala residents also trade minerals, particularly gold and cassiterite.

The transport network is underdeveloped, with only terrestrial transport available. Artisanal activity is virtually absent. The local population shows little involvement in handicrafts, mainly due to the lack of training opportunities and skilled instructors in the area.

== Security problems ==
=== Regional conflicts and wars ===
The Luindi Chiefdom was affected by the wars that engulfed the Democratic Republic of the Congo in the late 1990s. Research by Ambroise Bulambo Katambu documents the widespread massacres in Kivu during the First Congo War (1996–1997) and the Second Congo War (1998–2003), including the killings of Rwandan Hutu refugees, atrocities committed by Interahamwe militias, and human rights violations attributed to the Alliance des Forces Démocratiques pour la Libération du Congo-Zaïre (AFDL) and its allies. The Second Congo War emerged from a rupture between President Laurent-Désiré Kabila and his former Rwandan and Ugandan backers, whom he accused of harboring coup d'état ambitions and of interfering in Congolese sovereignty. Some journalists such as Keith Harmon Snow, have alleged that the United States provided military assistance to Rwanda prior to the Second Congo War, partly to secure access to Congolese mineral resources. Reports claim that a U.S. Army Rwanda Interagency Assessment Team (RIAT) was deployed in July 1998 to train Rwandan units, while figures such as Roger Winter of the U.S. Committee for Refugees and Immigrants were accused of supporting insurgencies. Kabila, who had overthrown Mobutu Sese Seko in 1997, was accused of sidelining Tutsi elements in his government while promoting his Katangan allies. In July 1998, he dismissed Rwandan General James Kabarebe, then Chief of Staff of the Congolese army, and ordered all Rwandan Patriotic Army (RPA) troops to leave Congolese territory. This triggered the creation of the Rassemblement Congolais pour la Démocratie (RCD), supported militarily by Rwanda and Uganda.

On 2 August 1998, mutinous Congolese troops allied with the RPA, the Ugandan People's Defence Force (UPDF), the Burundian Armed Forces (FAB), and remnants of the ex-FAZ declared their rebellion in Goma. Within weeks, the insurgents captured much of North and South Kivu, Orientale Province, and North Katanga. Their advance toward Kinshasa was halted only after Angola and Zimbabwe intervened on Kabila's behalf. The war then crystallized into a division of the country: Kabila's government, backed by Angola, Zimbabwe, Namibia, Chad, and Sudan, controlled the west and south, while the RCD, supported by the RPA, UPDF, and FAB, held much of the east.

The conflict grew increasingly fragmented as Uganda sponsored the creation of the Mouvement pour la Libération du Congo (MLC) under Jean-Pierre Bemba, which administered captured territories in Équateur Province. By March 1999, disputes between Rwanda and Uganda led to a split within the RCD, producing RCD-Goma, aligned with Rwanda, and RCD-Mouvement de Libération (RCD-ML), aligned with Uganda. Although RCD-Goma and its military wing, the Armée Nationale Congolaise (ANC), quickly secured urban centers in South Kivu with RPA and FAB assistance, they struggled to impose authority over rural areas. The RCD's reliance on Tutsi and Banyamulenge constituencies, combined with violence against civilians, fueled widespread resistance, with local populations increasingly turning to Mayi-Mayi militias and other community-based armed groups for protection. Movements such as Mudundu 40 in Walungu Territory gained prominence, while others, like General Padiri's division in Bunyakiri and Colonel Dunia's Forces d'Autodéfense Populaires (FAP) in Shabunda Territory, received arms and financial support from Kinshasa. Some Mayi-Mayi groups also aligned themselves with Hutu armed factions, including the ex-FAR/Interahamwe, reorganized under the Armée de Libération du Rwanda (ALiR), as well as the Burundian Hutu movement CNDD-FDD. In turn, RCD-Goma forces, together with the RPA and FAB, launched counter-operations characterized by mass atrocities, including systematic sexual violence and reprisals against civilians.

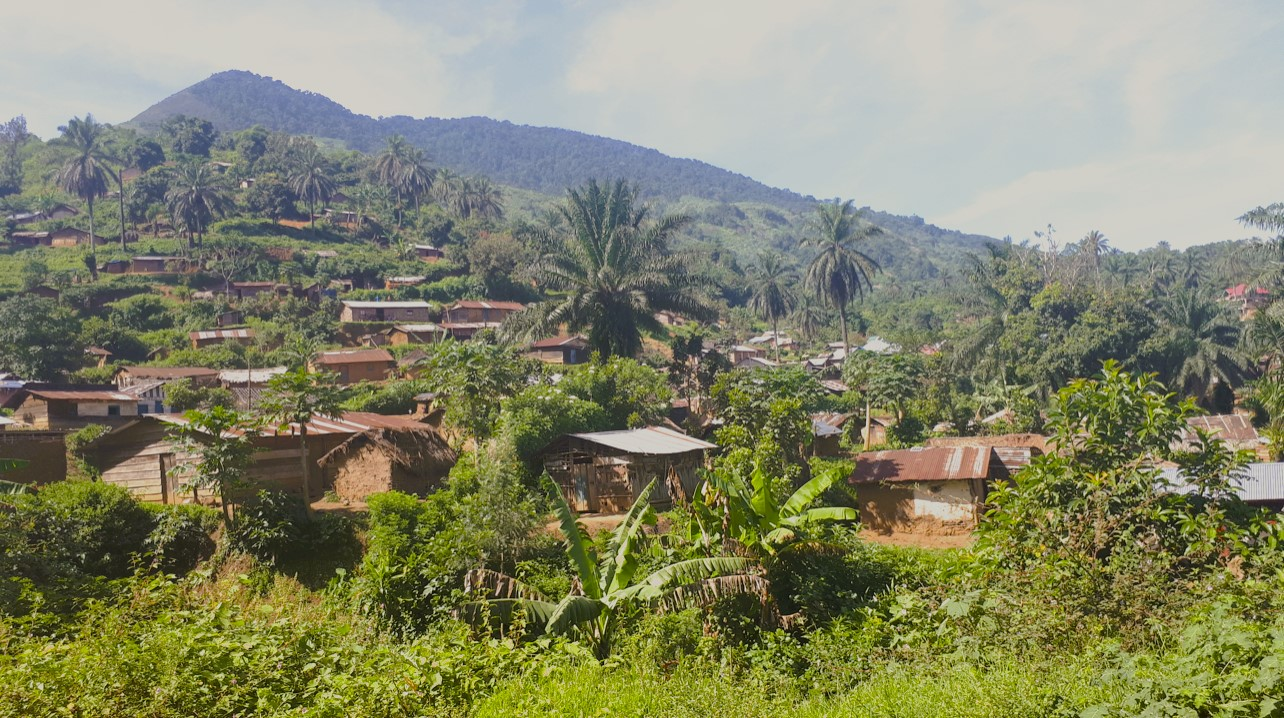
The Kasika village, where the first cases of Kasika massacre were reported.

On 24 August 1998, ANC and RPA carried out the Kasika massacre, which killed more than 1,000 civilians in the villages of Kasika, Kilungutwe, and Kalama. Women, children, and infants were among the victims, many of whom were subjected to rape, torture, and genital mutilation before being killed. The massacre was carried out in retaliation for the death of around twenty ANC and RPA officers in a Mayi-Mayi ambush near Bukavu the previous day. In addition to the killings, soldiers pillaged the villages and set fire to numerous homes, while the bodies of children and infants were thrown into pit latrines. On 2 September 1998, thirteen civilians, including children and elderly people, were executed by ANC troops in the village of Kitutu, and over 100 houses were burned between Kabuki and Kilima. On 5 March 1999, in Kamituga, more than 100 civilians were detained at ANC and RPA headquarters on Mero hill, killed with bladed weapons, and buried in mass graves at the site of the University of Kamituga. A week later, on 13 March 1999, ANC and RPA forces killed a dozen civilians in the groupements of Mulambi and Karhendezi in Burhinyi Chiefdom. The killings were carried out in reprisal for earlier clashes with the Mudundu 40. On 17 March, seventy-two civilians were massacred in the village of Budaha in Burhinyi Chiefdom, most killed by firearms or bladed weapons. On 20 September 1999, twenty-five civilians, including women and children, were executed in Kionvu groupement after being deceived into believing they were gathered to receive food aid. In November 1999, fifteen women from the villages of Bulinzi, Ilinda, Mungombe, and Ngando near Mwenga were tortured, raped, and buried alive. Victims were subjected to cruel and degrading treatment, including sexual violence with sticks and the insertion of hot peppers into their genital organs. During this period, ANC and RPA forces committed repeated acts of torture, rape, and extrajudicial killings in Mwenga itself. Civilians accused of collaborating with the Mayi-Mayi were confined in pits filled with water, salt, and peppers, and some bodies were later discovered behind the Catholic church in Mwenga.
