= Kilungutwe village =

Coordinates: 2°53′18″S 28°34′23″E

Kilungutwe
- Village
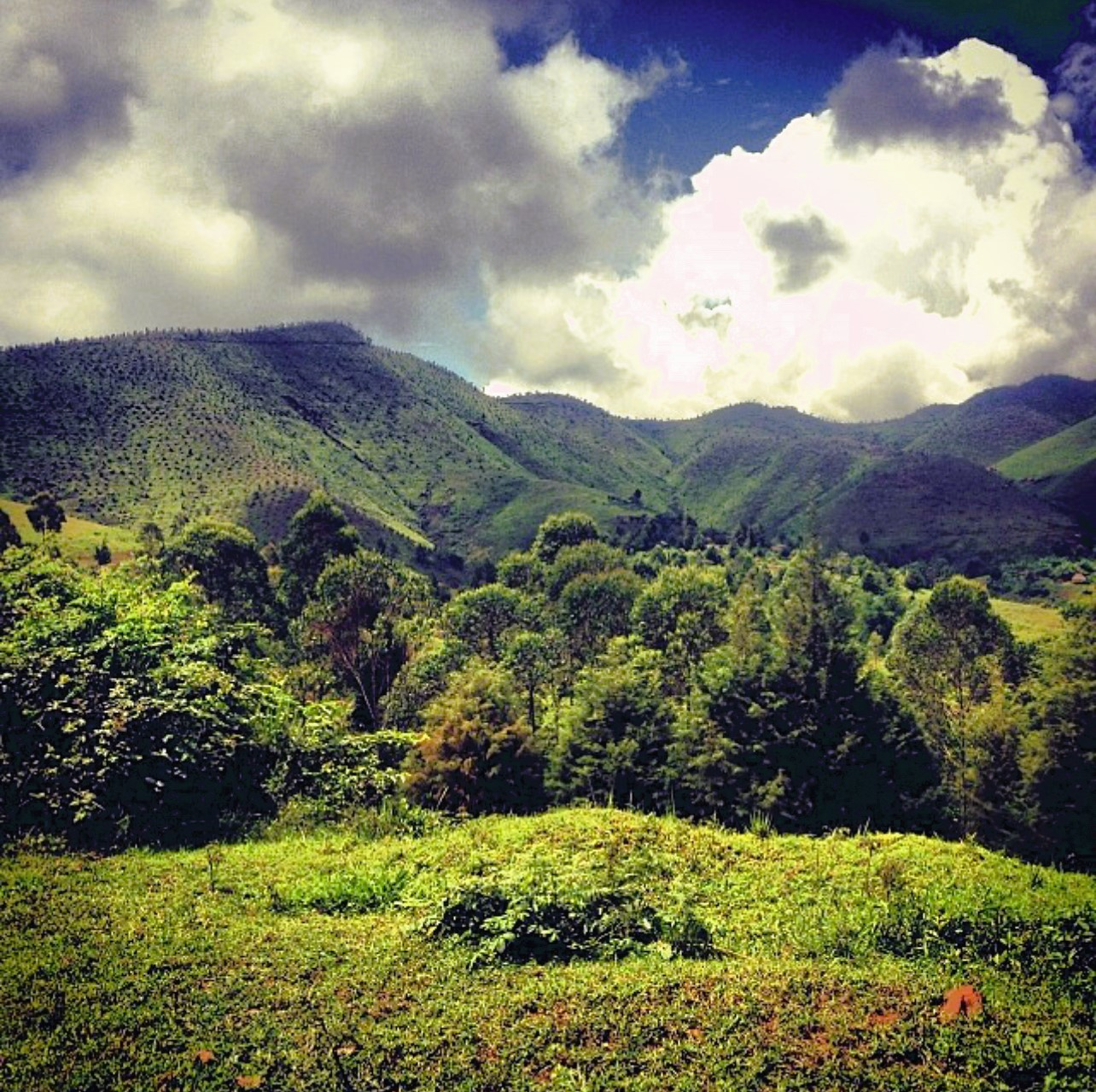
- The lush, emerald-green hills enveloping Kilungutwe, January 2014

- Location within Democratic Republic of the Congo
- Country: Democratic Republic of the Congo
- Province: South Kivu
- Territory: Mwenga
- Chiefdom: Luindi
- Time zone: UTC+2 (CAT)

Kilungutwe is a small village in the Luindi Chiefdom, located in the valley of the Kilungutwe River in the Mwenga Territory of the South Kivu Province. Situated in the eastern part of the Democratic Republic of the Congo (DRC), Kilungutwe is positioned nearby the neighboring villages of Kirukungutu and Chowe. The region is a melting pot for many ethnic groups, boasting a diverse ethnocultural landscape. It is also a point of confluence for numerous ethnic groups, including the Lega, Nyindu, Shi, Fuliiru, Holoholo, Bwari, Vira, Hunde, Nyanga, Bembe, and Amba people.

Kilungutwe has been the site of violence for nearly three decades due to its proximity along the route to a nearby gold mine. In the First and Second Congo Wars, the region experienced a surge in armed conflicts that resulted in displacement, loss of lives, and property damage.

== History ==
According to Belgian anthropologist Daniel P. Biebuyck, the Mwenga Territory has conventionally been inhabited by the Lega people. However, the area also accommodated diverse ethnic groups, including the Nyindu, Shi, Fuliiru, Bembe, Zimba, Vira, Kumu, and Songora people.

=== Security problems ===
Like many regions in the South Kivu Province, Kilungutwe has been embroiled in a complex and protracted conflict since the First Congo War, which resulted in widespread displacement, human rights abuses, and loss of life.

==== Kasika massacre ====
On August 24, 1998, amid the Kasika massacre, Kilungutwe was attacked by the Rwanda-sponsored armed forces Rally for Congolese Democracy (Rassemblement Congolais pour la Démocratie; RCD). The attack resulted in a massacre of over 43 civilians, many of whom were women and children. The RCD forces callously throw the corpses of their victims into common graves, pit latrines, and even the Kilungutwe River.

== See also ==
- Kasika
- Kilungutwe River
- Nyindu people
- Second Congo War
- Katogota
- Bwegera
- Lemera
- Bibogobogo
