= Kasika massacre =

1998 massacre during the Kivu Conflict

- Part of Second Congo War
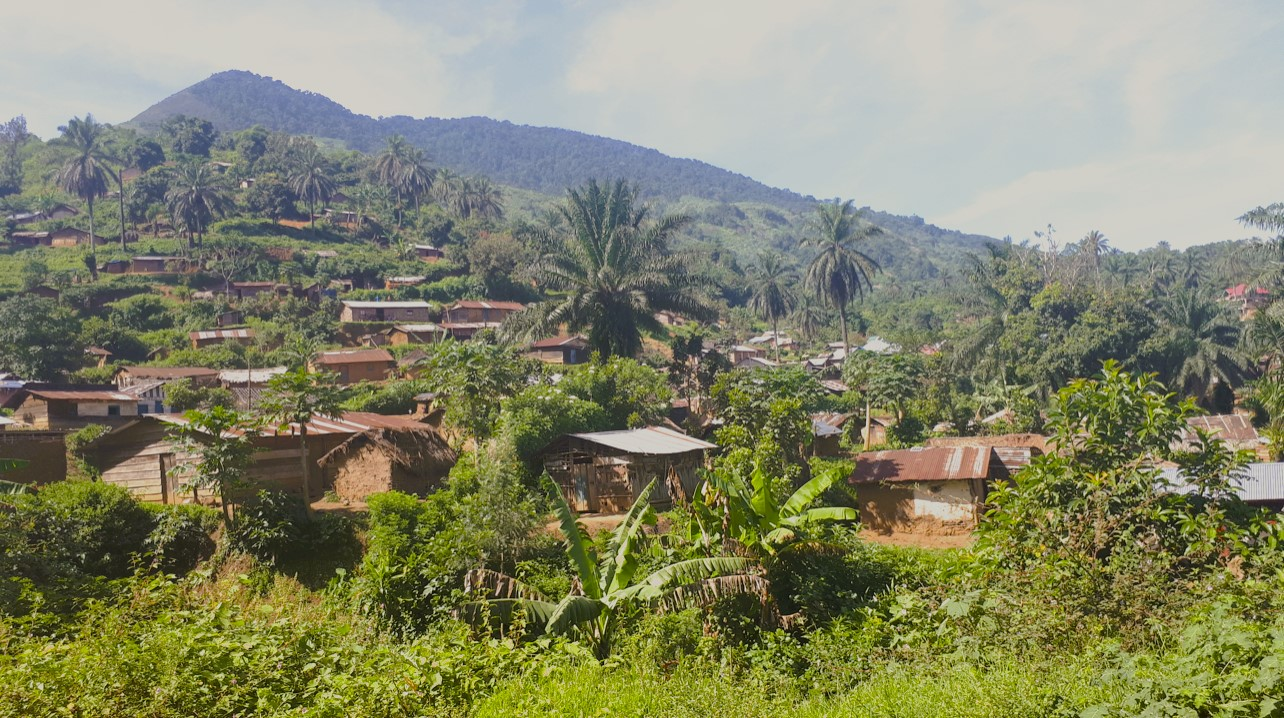
- The Kasika village, where the first cases of massacres were reported.
- Location: Luindi Chiefdom, Mwenga Territory, South Kivu, Democratic Republic of the Congo
- Date: August 24, 1998
- Attack type: Massacre, ethnic cleansing, arson, sexual violence
- Deaths: 1,000 civilians killed per DRC Mapping Exercise Report
- Victim: Nyindu people
- Perpetrators: Rally for Congolese Democracy (RCD) and Rwanda Defence Force (RDF)
- Motive: Allegations that the local population had offered support to the Mai-Mai rebels and the government of Laurent-Désiré Kabila

The Kasika massacre (French: Massacre de Kasika) took place on August 24, 1998, in the villages of Kasika, Kilungutwe, Kalama, and Zokwe, located in the Luindi Chiefdom of the Mwenga Territory in the South Kivu Province, situated in the eastern part of the Democratic Republic of the Congo (DRC). Troops from the Rally for Congolese Democracy (RCD) and Rwandan Patriotic Army (RPA), primarily composed of Tutsi armed forces, killed over 1,000 civilians, predominantly belonging to the Nyindu community.

The massacre's memory is deeply ingrained in the collective consciousness of the Congolese populace and affected prominent politicians, human rights activists, and organizations dedicated to human rights.

== Historical background ==
=== First and Second Congo Wars ===
In July 1994, following the assassination of then-President General Juvénal Habyarimana, whose 21-year-long reign had collapsed into genocide, Paul Kagame and the Rwandan Patriotic Front (RPF) seized power in Rwanda. Subsequently, a significant number of Hutu rebels, colloquially known as the 'Interahamwe,' along with Hutu refugees, sought refuge in the eastern Zaire forested enclaves encircling Uvira, Walungu, Kabare, Kalehe, Shabunda, Goma, Rutchuru, Mugunga, Lac Vert, Masisi, Walikale, Tingi-Tingi, Amisi, Pangi, Kasongo, and Kindu.

During the First Congo War, Kagame's Rwandan Patriotic Army (RPA) and Laurent-Désiré Kabila's Alliance of Democratic Forces for the Liberation of Congo-Zaire (AFDL) alongside Zairean Tutsi army defectors launched military operations to locate and incapacitate Hutu militias and refugees. They also aimed to overthrow Mobutu's government, which they accused of excluding Tutsis from political influence. They swiftly occupied strategic positions in the South Kivu Province and used it as a staging ground to take over other regions. The military campaign resulted in numerous deaths of Rwandan and Burundian refugees, Zairean civilians, and even assimilated refugee populations. By mid-1996, territorial gains transformed the ostensibly localized rebellion in eastern Zaire into a formidable challenge for Mobutu. In 1997, rebels advanced to Kinshasa, driving out Mobutu and leading to Laurent-Désiré Kabila proclaiming himself president on May 17, renaming the country the Democratic Republic of the Congo (DRC).

In July 1998, tensions escalated shortly after Kabila's ascendancy. He mandated the withdrawal of Rwandan, Ugandan, and Angolan troops. Despite the directive, the Rwandan army obstinately refused, prompting Kabila to sever ties, accusing Rwanda and Uganda of interference. Subsequently, disenchanted Rwandan Tutsi factions coalesced to form the Rally for Congolese Democracy (Rassemblement Congolais pour la Démocratie: RCD), aiming to depose Kabila due to his reluctance to share authority. RCD forces gained control over substantial territories in the South Kivu Province, displacing civilians and eventually seizing a significant segment of Mwenga Territory.

In retaliation, local defense groups, including the Maï-Maï, emerged to shield communities from RCD and RPA incursions. On August 23, 1998, a Maï-Maï orchestrated an ambush on the route between Bukavu and Kindu, which killed approximately 20 RCD and RPA forces, averting them from gaining control over Mwenga Territory.

== Attack ==
The initial attack took place at a Catholic church parish in Kasika village, located in the Lwindi Chiefdom, approximately 108 kilometers from Bukavu in the Mwenga Territory of the South Kivu Province. The Missionary International Service News Agency (MISNA), a Rome-based Roman Catholic humanitarian news agency operating in the area, was the first to report the massacre in December 1999.

According to MISNA, the RCD forces retaliated for casualties endured in an ambush by elements of Mai-Mai in the Lwindi Chiefdom on August 23. Infuriated by the loss of their members during the ambush, the RCD forces launched an attack on the Catholic Church parish in Kasika the following day, resulting in the deaths of thirty-seven civilians, including the parish priest (Abbé Stanislas), three nuns, and parishioners. Additionally, other civilians were killed in the surrounding communities. The RCD forces also murdered Mwami Mubeza III, born Naluindi Francis, the chief of the Lwindi Chiefdom. He was bound, killed with a machete, his heart was extracted from his chest, and his head was severed. In addition, 26 other individuals were killed in his residence.

While attempting to flee, 385 people who had not been killed in the church were callously massacred. During their journey to Kilungutwe, the attackers ruthlessly killed 43 people and burned 50 others in a village called Zokwe. In the vicinity of Zokwe, on the way to Kilungutwe, in the locality of Kalama, RCD and RPA soldiers burned alive 95 people in their houses. In Kilungutwe, which was situated 15 miles away from Kasika and served as a hub for other villagers to acquire supplies, soldiers identified as RPA, allied with the RCD according to survivors' accounts, opened fire on the unarmed population gathered in the central market square, resulting in the deaths of at least 173 civilians. Subsequently, the soldiers instructed the villagers to gather in huts in groups of 50 people of all ages, where they massacred them. Some survivors reported these atrocities to Amnesty International investigators. In another house, 54 people were forcibly assembled. They were compelled to undress, after which the soldiers tied them up with their clothes before killing them. The soldiers followed the same method to kill over 200 more people.

During the 37-mile (60 km) journey from Kasika to Kilungutwe, passing through Kalama on August 23 and 24, over 1,000 civilians, including men, women, children, and the elderly, were brutally massacred, as reported by the United Nations Mapping Report. The exact extent of the destruction of houses and other infrastructure could not be verified due to poor security conditions and uncertainty regarding the protection of witnesses.

== Aftermath ==
The aftermath of the massacre reverberated throughout the nation, evoking thoroughgoing shock and disgust among the Congolese population, as well as garnering condemnation from prominent opposition politicians. The massacre was widely condemned by internationally recognized human rights organizations such as the United Nations, Amnesty International, and Human Rights Watch. Kofi Annan expressed deep concern for the victims and pledged ongoing support for regional initiatives aimed at facilitating a ceasefire, withdrawing foreign troops, and fostering democratic peace in the country. He also expressed regret that the findings of the massacre investigation had not yet been made public. In response to the crisis, Laurent-Désiré Kabila ordered the complete evacuation of the rebels as a precondition for a ceasefire.

Different perspectives emerged regarding the involvement of foreign troops. President Robert Mugabe of Zimbabwe claimed that Zimbabwean and Angolan troops were deployed to support Kabila's regime under the auspices of the Southern African Development Community (SADC). However, Nelson Mandela disagreed with Mugabe's decision, asserting that Mugabe had no authority to deploy troops under the SADC umbrella. Mandela advocated for a peaceful resolution to the conflict.

Kabila's government attributed blame to the Rwandan government and declared its unwillingness to participate in ceasefire talks until Rwandan and Ugandan troops were withdrawn from the DRC. Andre Kapanga, the DRC's ambassador to the United Nations, emphasized the importance of troop withdrawal as a prerequisite for meaningful dialogue on a ceasefire.

It was a dark night which changed the history of our land and our people. We lost our hope upon seeing the ‘Mwami’ (traditional leader) killed together with the members of the royal court. Nothing like that happened before in our tribe. The heart of the land was grieved. That night the Banyamulenge soldiers became our number one enemies…. With the passing of time, we have learned to forget. But we still wait to see if some representatives of Banyamulenge will come one day to ask forgiveness to the members of our tribe who are willing to forgive them.

— Kakozi Milenge, the survivor of the massacre, May 27, 2010

The United States, through the U.S. State Department, expressed its support for the Southern African Development Community's efforts to resolve the crisis in the DRC. The United States aligned itself with the regional initiative, endorsing the endeavor to bring an end to the conflict.

=== Nyindu community ===
The massacre deeply impacted the Nyindu community, leaving them overwhelmed by grief and trauma as they grappled with the loss of their loved ones and the devastation inflicted upon their homes. The Nyindu community initiated legal proceedings to hold the perpetrators accountable for their crimes. They urged the Congolese authorities to confront the root causes that fueled such violence.

The community also forged partnerships with local and international advocacy groups to establish support networks, counseling services, and empowerment initiatives to provide assistance to survivors and assist them in rebuilding their shattered lives.
