= Nyindu people =

Congolese ethnic group

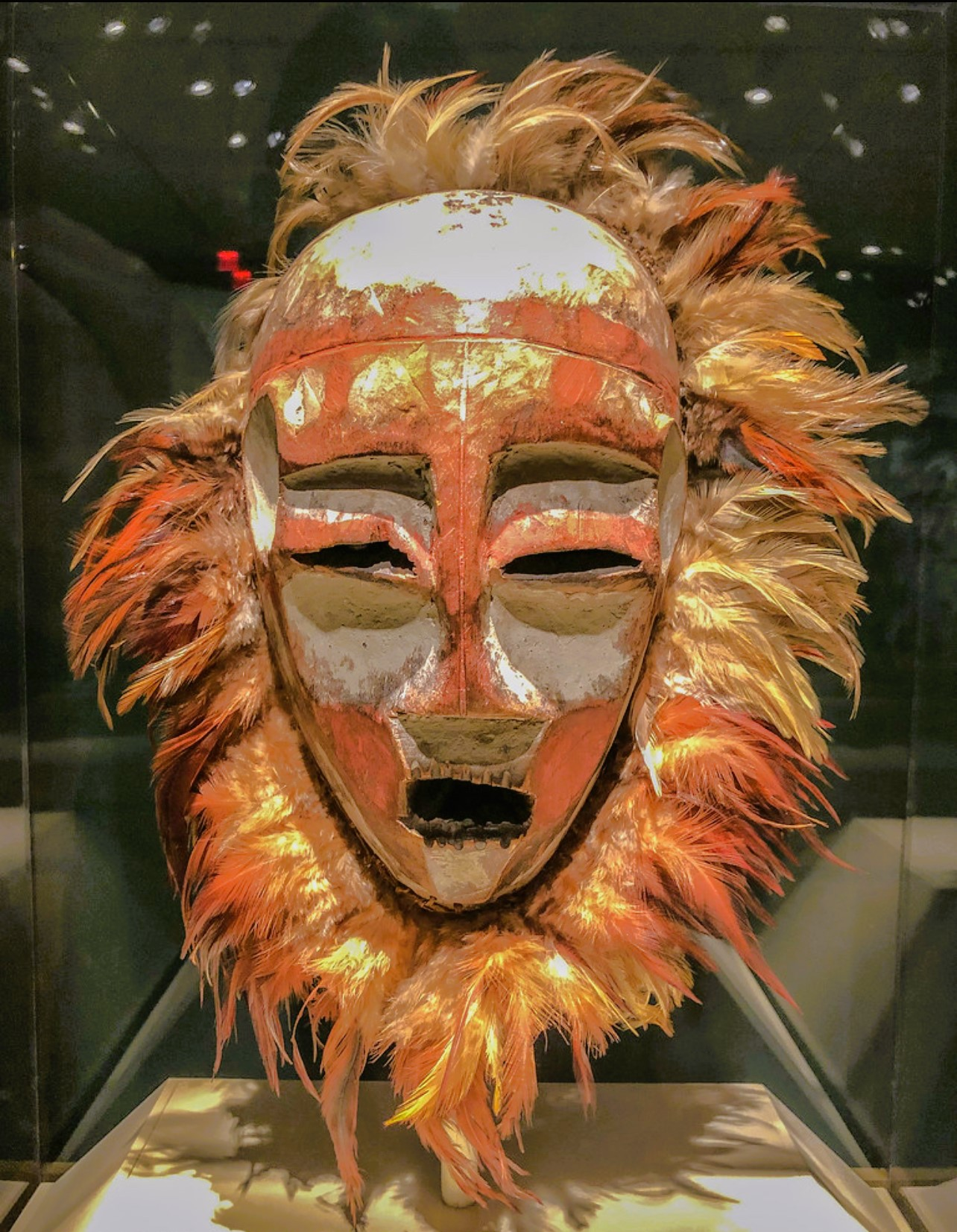
- A Nyindu face mask with a feathered collar, Monument Avenue in Richmond, Virginia

Languages
- Kinyindu, Kiswahili, French, English

Religion
- Christianity, traditional Nyindu religion, Islam, irreligious

Related ethnic groups
- Fuliru, Vira, Shi, Havu, Lega

The Nyindu people are a Bantu ethnic group predominantly located along the Ulindi River in the northern, western, and southern regions, as well as near the Kilungutwe River in the Mwenga Territory of the South Kivu province in the eastern part of the Democratic Republic of the Congo.

According to the 1970 census, the total population of the Luindi Chiefdom was 14,920. By 1977, estimates put the Nyindu population at 15,000, with a population density of 14.6 persons per square kilometer in the Luindi Chiefdom.

- Person: Munyindu
- People: Banyindu
- Language: Kinyindu
- Country: Bunyindu

The Nyindu are known for their agronomic customs, including the cultivation of staples such as Zea mays (maize), Manihot esculenta (cassava), and Phaseolus (beans). Additionally, they partake in animal husbandry, particularly focusing on bovine rearing.

The Nyindu societal structure is organized into clans, each governed by a chieftain who functions as a leader and arbitrator.

== History ==
The provenance of the Nyindu people remains somewhat obscure due to limited ethnological documentation. Japanese anthropologist Takako Yamada's "A Report on the Ethnobotany of the Nyindu in the Eastern Part of the Former Zaire" suggests that the Nyindu are predominantly a blend of indigenous groups (from M'minje and Lenge origins, intermarried with Pygmy communities) and migratory offshoots from the Lega and the Fuliiru-Vira. Nyindu oral tradition recounts that the progeny of their first kings governed neighboring populations such as the Shi, Hunde, Fuliiru, and Vira. Moreover, some Nyindu people affiliated with the Kabila ya Banyindu share clans with the Lega, Fuliiru, and Vira, including the Batumba, Balambo, and Banyemganga. Nyindu architecture exhibits influences from the Lega and the Bembe, resulting in close cultural and historical affiliations with the Lega, the Shi, and the Bembe.

In recent decades, the Nyindu have faced substantial adversities, such as conflict and displacement induced by political instability and armed factions in the region. On 24 August 1998, during the Second Congo War, a massacre was perpetrated by the Rally for Congolese Democracy and the Rwandan Patriotic Army in Kasika and its neighboring villages, which resulted in over 1,000 fatalities, the majority of whom were Nyindu. The massacre is widely considered one of the most lethal attacks in the conflict, which inflicted profound human suffering and displacement across the nation. In the aftermath, the Nyindu have advocated for greater representation and the recognition of their rights. The international community has also helped support the Nyindu and other affected communities, including efforts to promote peace, security, and development in the region.

== Culture ==
=== Economy ===
The Nyindu's economy is centered around slash-and-burn agriculture, with certain communities engaged in livestock rearing. The Nyindu cultivate nearly 40 distinct crops, primarily in modest quantities. As of 1977, the principal crops included cassava (Manihot utilissima), maize (Zea mays), kidney bean (Phaseolus vulgaris), and banana (Musa × paradisiaca). Nonetheless, the most traditional crops, chakula ya asili, among the Nyindu encompassed finger millet (Eleusine coracana), sorghum (Sorghum bicolor), and sweet potato (Ipomoea batatas), supplemented by banana, yam (Dioscorea), and taro (Colocasia).

Subsistence activities also include the hunting of mammals and avifauna, as well as fishing in fluvial environments. Prominent hunting techniques encompass communal net hunting with canines, spear hunting, and trapping. A diverse array of trapping methods includes spring traps, gravity traps, birdlime traps, pits, and baited traps. Fishing techniques comprise rod fishing, scoop net fishing, and basket traps set in dams and wires, as well as fish poison, scoop nets, and scoop baskets. The Nyindu also engage in small-scale commerce and market activities, vending their agricultural products and goods in local markets. The region inhabited by the Nyindu is endowed with abundant natural resources, including minerals such as gold, tin, and coltan; however, the extraction and trade of these resources have frequently been associated with conflict and human rights violations.

=== Language ===
The Nyindu people speak Kinyindu, a Bantu language within the Atlantic-Congo language family. According to Belgian scholar of Central African art, Daniel P. Biebuyck, the Nyindu have the closest cultural and historical connections with the Lega people among neighboring ethnic groups. Nonetheless, the linguistic classification of the Nyindu language remains ambiguous. Belgian scholar of Bantu languages and people in the eastern part of the Belgian Congo, Van Bulck, includes the Nyindu language within the subgroup of Lake Kivu of the young Bantu group of Northeastern Bantu (Section B). He posits the Nyindu language as part of the same language group as the Shi, Hunde, Havu, Tembo, Kinyarwanda, and Kirundi, yet distinct from the Lega language. Conversely, Belgian historian and anthropologist Jan Vansina includes the Nyindu language within the Maniema group, the same group as the Lega language.
