= Shi language =

Congolese language

Shi
- Kishi/Mashi/Amashi
- Native to: Democratic Republic of Congo
- Region: Sud-Kivu Province, North Kivu, Nkombo Island
- Ethnicity: Bashi
- Native speakers
- Language family: Niger–Congo?: Atlantic–Congo; Benue–Congo; Bantoid; Bantu; Northeast Bantu; Great Lakes Bantu; Shi–Havu; Shi

Language codes
- ISO 639-3: shr
- Glottolog: shii1238
- Guthrie code: JD.53

Flag of the Democratic Republic of the Congo

Shi, or Mashi, is a Bantu language of the Democratic Republic of the Congo.

== Phonology ==
=== Consonants ===
		Labial	Dental/ Alveolar	Post-alv./ Palatal	Velar	Glottal
Nasal		m	n	ɲ		
Plosive/ Affricate	voiceless	p	t	t͡ʃ	k	
Plosive/ Affricate	voiced	b	d	d͡ʒ	ɡ	
Fricative	voiceless	f	s	ʃ		h
Fricative	voiced	v	z			
Rhotic	voiceless		r̥			
Rhotic	voiced		r			
Lateral			l			
Approximant		w		j		

- Sounds /t, d, n/ are commonly heard as dental [t̪, d̪, n̪].
- /d͡ʒ/ may also be heard as a fricative [ʒ].

=== Vowels ===
	Front	Central	Back
Close	i iː		u uː
Close-mid	e eː		o oː
Open		a aː	

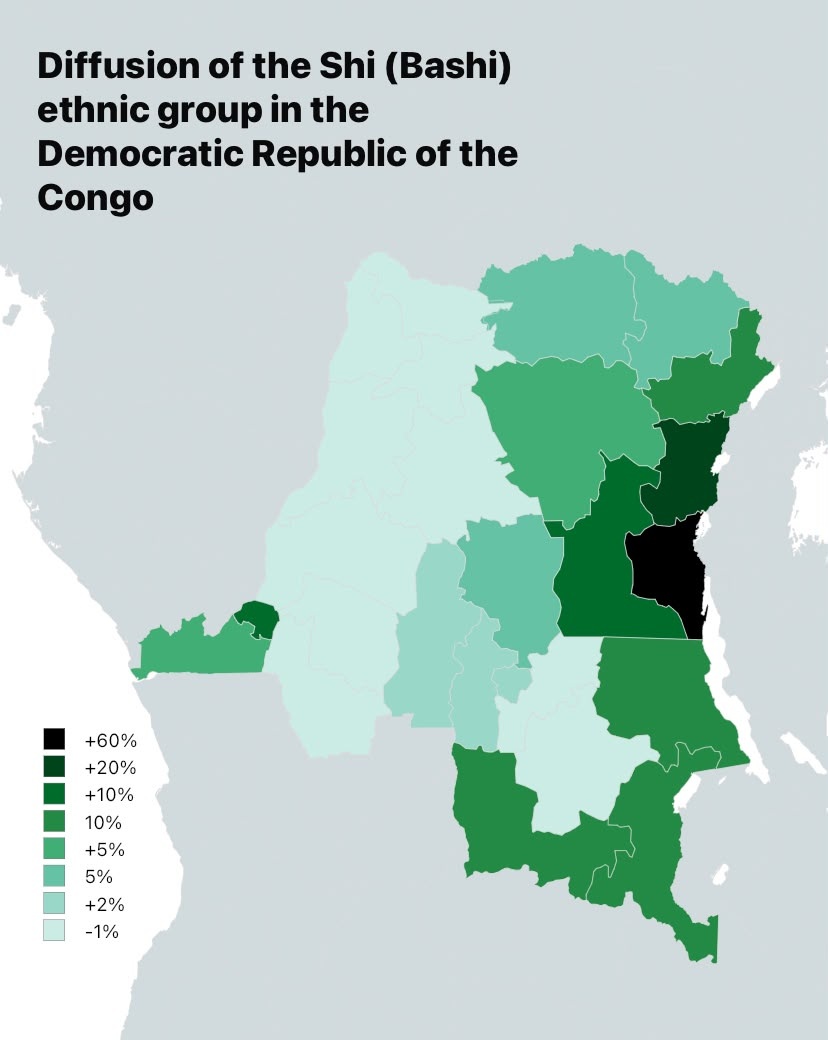
Diffusion of the Shi (Bashi) ethnic group in the Democratic Republic of the Congo
