= Bushi (region) =

Area in the Democratic Republic of the Congo

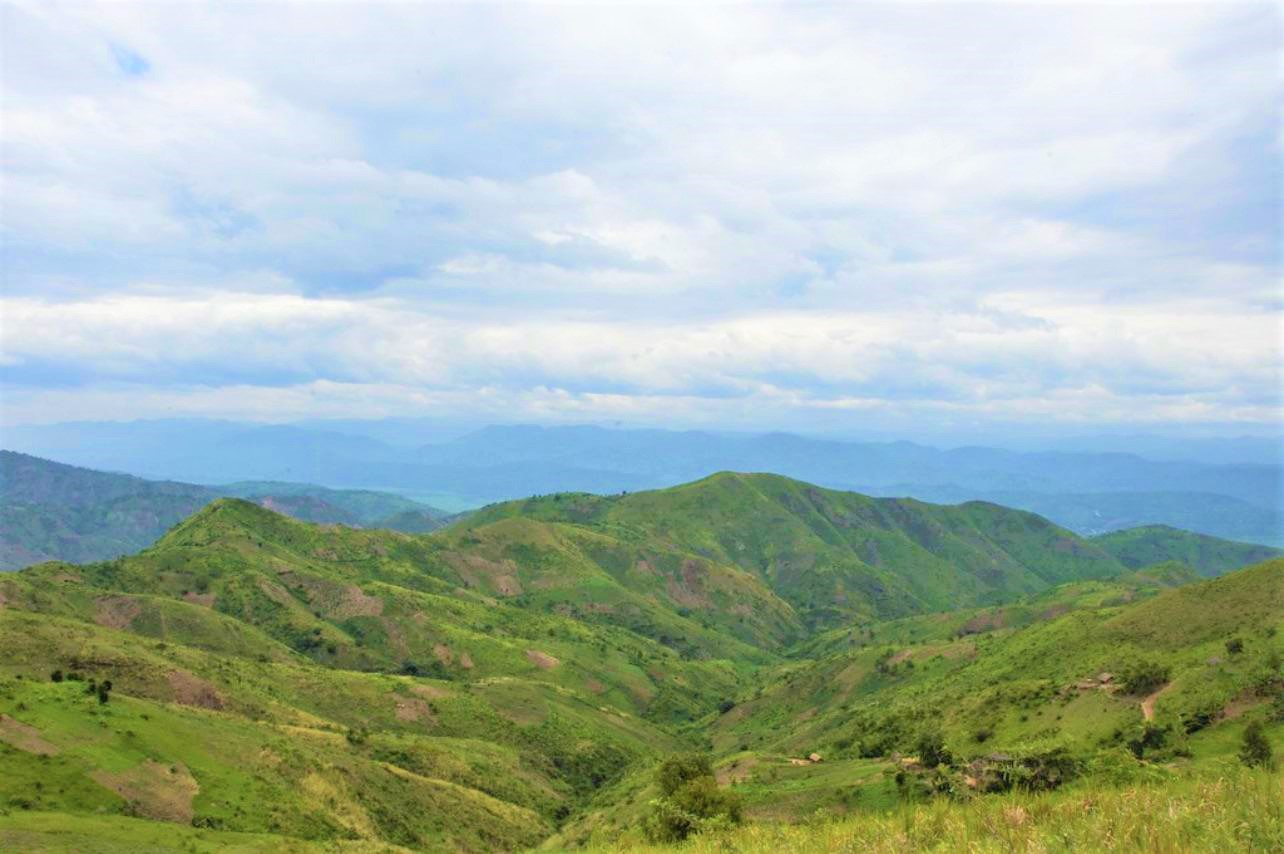
Kamanyola high plateau situated in the Ruzizi Plain within the Ngweshe Chiefdom

Bushi is a cultural and common linguistic region located in the eastern part of the Democratic Republic of the Congo, primarily within the South Kivu province. It lies along the Mitumba Mountains and includes the administrative territories of Walungu, Kabare, Kalehe, Mwenga, and Idjwi, as well as the city of Bukavu. Estimates of the population vary widely, ranging from 7 to 12 million inhabitants. The region is historically organized as a kingdom, subdivided chiefdoms.

The inhabitants of Bushi are known as the Shi (plural: Bashi; singular: Mushi), who are also referred to as Banyabungo. The Shi language, known as Mashi, belongs to the Central (Zone J) Bantu group and served as a lingua franca across the region, while common religious practices included belief in the supreme deity Nyamuzinda, venerated through ancestral spirits (Bazimu)—notably Lyangombe, a central spiritual figure in the 19th century. Agriculture forms the basis of the local economy, with the majority of the population engaged in farming. The Shi kingdom is headed by a hereditary monarch, the Mwami, currently Alexandre Kabare Rugemanizi III.

== People ==
Bashi
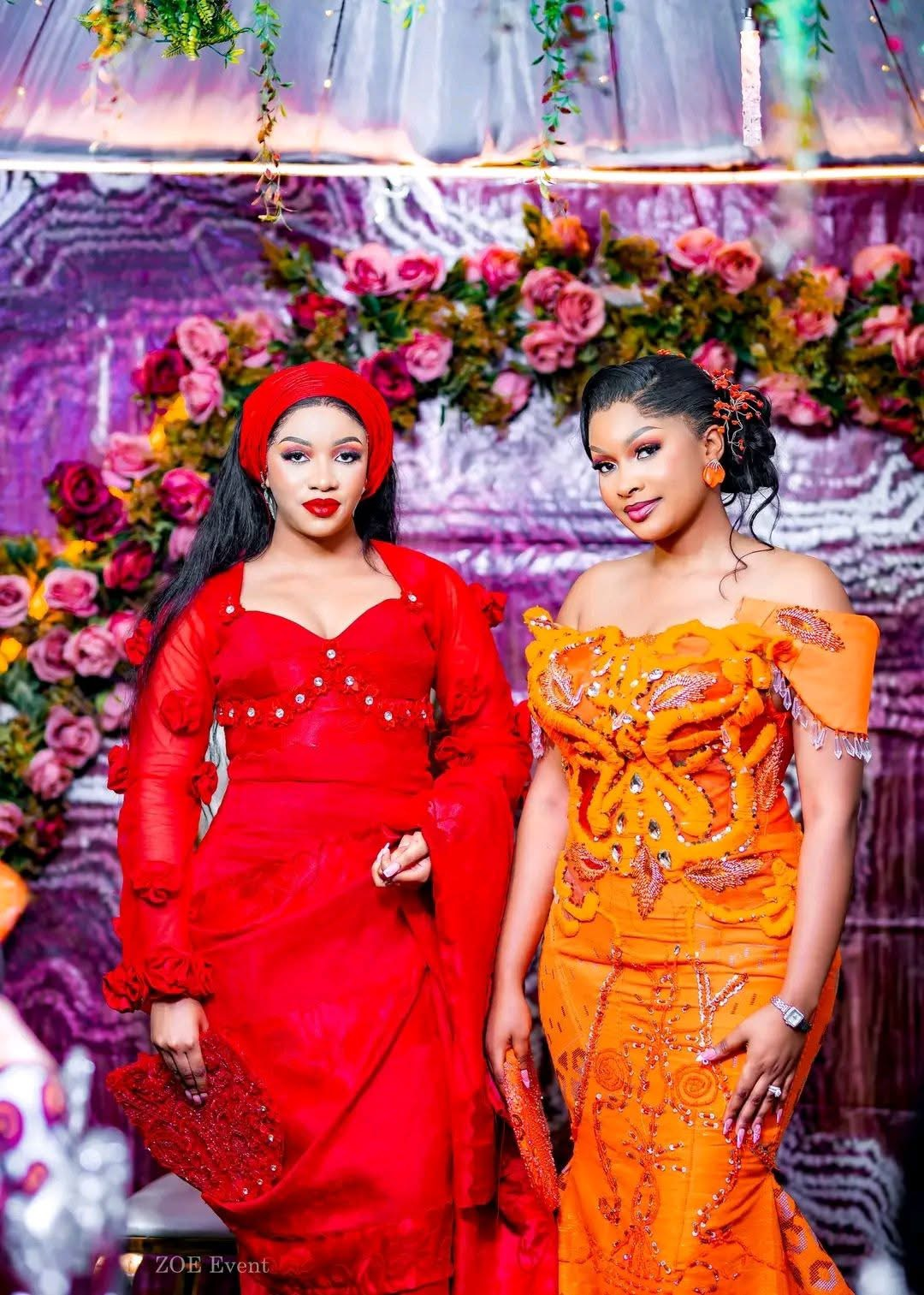
- Two Shi women at a wedding in the Democratic Republic of Congo

Total population
- 15000000

Regions with significant populations
- Democratic Republic of the Congo

Languages
- Mashi; Kiswahili; French; English

Religion
- Christianity; Bashi religion

Related ethnic groups
- Bahavu; Bafuliru; Bavira; Banyindu; other Bantu peoples

The inhabitants of Bushi are the Bashi, and they speak Shi. Etymologically, the term Bashi consists of the prefix Ba- and the root Shi. The prefixes Mu- (singular) and Ba- (plural) mark nouns in the first noun class, which refers to people. The semantic value of the root Shi is, however, more complex to define. This root appears in several words, such as mi-shi meaning "water", lwi-shi meaning "river", and kushira meaning "to lie down". It also appears in Ishwa, meaning fertile soil or field, a term derived from the combination of water and earth. The root Shi is associated with strength, power, knowledge, endurance, and the ability to submit to authority or endure suffering. A customary chief or notable addresses his subjects as "My Bashis" and an individual as Mushi.

== Geographical extent ==
Historically, Bushi has been interpreted in different ways, with earlier literature often limiting it to a narrow political definition. In many publications, the territorial extent of Bushi was confined to the chiefdoms of Kabare and Ngweshe, thus excluding other neighboring chiefdoms such as Kaziba, Luhwindja, Burhinyi, Nindja, and Kalonge, which were either treated as peripheral or affiliated. This restricted definition has caused confusion, especially among outsiders unfamiliar with the region. For instance, historian Jacques Marissal asserted that Bushi extended only from the Bahunde in the north to the Bishugi in the south and was bounded to the west by the equatorial forest. Around 1880, Bushi originally consisted of seven kingdoms but by 1880 had been reduced to four: Nabushi, Ngweshe, Katana (Karhano), and Karhongo. Bernard Jean René Lugan likewise argued that the geographic extent of Bushi remains contested.

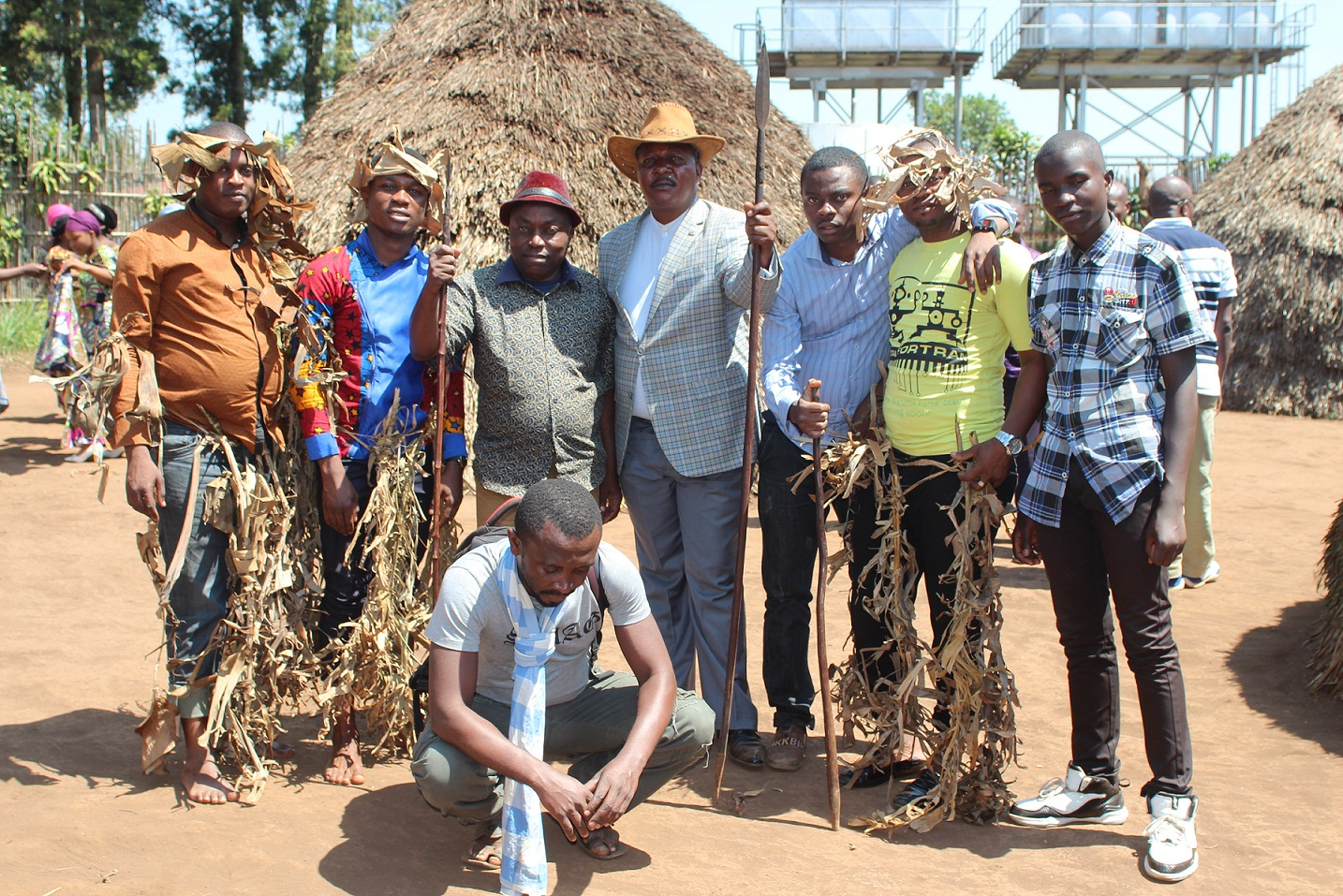
The Royal Court of Kabare Chiefdom, located in Kabare Territory, is also under the chieftaincy of the Bashi, who predominantly reside there

The confusion between the political and cultural dimensions of Bushi arose because many writers equated the centralized chiefdoms of Kabare and Ngweshe. These structures, which resembled Rwanda's centralized monarchy, were often used as models for understanding governance across the interlacustrine region. However, shared language, customs, religion, and social institutions among the Bashi have long formed a shared ethnic identity. As such, ethnic cohesion among the Bashi does not necessarily imply a unified political system. Given the Bashi's shared culture and identity, the region of Bushi is best conceptualized using the phrase coined by historian Jean-Pierre Chrétien in his work on the Buha: "one people, several kingdoms".

Geographically, Bushi encompasses a substantial portion of South Kivu. It lies southwest of Lake Kivu, covering an estimated area of approximately 4,600 square kilometers, between 2° and 2°80' south latitude and 28°20' and 29° east longitude. The region is bordered to the east by the Ruzizi River, Lake Kivu, and Rwanda; to the west by the forested highlands of Bulega; to the north by the Nyabarongo River, Buhavu, and Bunyakiri; and to the south by the Lumvi and Bufuliru rivers. Administratively, Bushi comprises several traditional chiefdoms (later reorganized as collectivities following colonial rule and administrative reforms in 1972), including Kabare in the north, Ngweshe in the center, Nindja and Kalonge in the northwest, Burhinyi, Luhwindja, and Kaziba in the west and southwest. The territory spans across parts of the administrative territories of Walungu and Kabare, as well as sections of Mwenga, Kalehe, and Bagira (Bukavu).

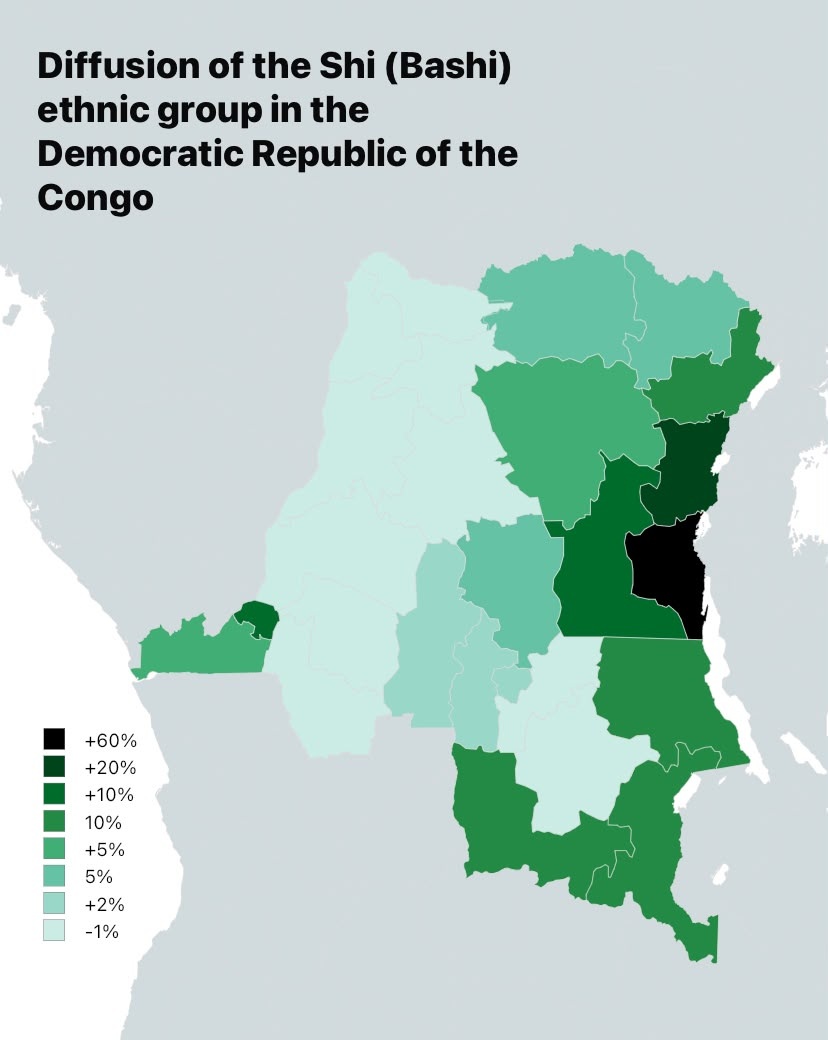
Diffusion of the Shi (Bashi) ethnic group in the Democratic Republic of the Congo

== History ==
=== Origins and settlement ===
The early settlement history of Bushi remains insufficiently understood due to limited and often biased sources. Existing written literature does not provide a comprehensive reconstruction of the remote origins of the Bashi, the processes through which the region was peopled, or the successive transformations of their socio-political institutions. Much of the early literature on Bushi was shaped by colonial-era research, with research disproportionately centered on the chiefdoms of Kabare and Ngweshe and influenced by the policies of the White Fathers. These missionaries advanced a doctrine in which traditional chiefs were to serve as intermediaries between colonial authorities and the local population. Such an approach produced a historiography disproportionately preoccupied with political and military structures, and one heavily entangled with racialized theories and Eurocentric presuppositions.

Early anthropological and historical interpretations, informed by evolutionist and diffusionist models, sought to classify the inhabitants of Bushi into three racial categories based on conjectured migratory "waves": the Barhwa (also known as Twa or Pygmies), regarded as indigenous forest dwellers; the Bantu, considered the dominant native population; and the Baluzi, portrayed as Hamitic migrants of Ethiopian or Nile Basin origin, frequently associated with Semitic peoples and imagined as a "dominant race". These theories mirrored racial typologies that shaped Rwandan historiography and were transposed to Bushi without empirical substantiation. While such theories persisted throughout the colonial era, they were also reinforced by deterministic ideologies privileging cultural and economic hierarchies. From the 1990s onward, however, scholars affiliated with the University of Zaire started a critical reappraisal of these narratives. Employing new methodologies in African historiography, they accentuated the significance of oral tradition, indigenous agency, and interdisciplinary approaches in an intellectual shift aimed at restoring African voices to the center of historical reconstruction and dismantling the distortions inherent in Eurocentric paradigms.

Contemporary hypotheses about the settlement of Bushi reject the notion of large-scale, racially distinct conquests. Instead, the region's human occupation is increasingly viewed as the result of gradual and localized migration. Small groups from neighboring regions, especially Rwanda, Burundi, and southern Kivu, are thought to have integrated into existing communities. In this context, the figure of the chief emerges not as a foreign conqueror of distant origin, but as a primus inter pares (first among equals), a leader chosen internally in response to social needs. Notably, the term "Hamite" does not exist in Mashi. Due to the lack of extensive archaeological and linguistic research in the region, scholars caution against overreaching extrapolations based on the current limits of oral literature, which itself may not extend very far in time or space.

Particular attention has been directed toward the dynastic origins of Bushi, especially the Lwindi lineage situated at the region's southern frontier. Oral traditions consistently recognize Lwindi as the sole royal line whose legitimacy is widely acknowledged. While the precise genealogical origins of its ancestors remain debated, prevailing oral accounts suggest that the founding figures of Bushi's dynasties either originated from the same ancestral group or arrived in the region contemporaneously.

=== Bushi Kingdom ===
According to local tradition, the Bushi Kingdom, centered around the city of Kabare, was founded somewhere before the year 1388, and remained independent until the Belgian colonialization of the Belgian Congo in the late 19th century. Controlling a region of high interest, the Bushi Kingdom was often attacked, and its people's rich oral tradition tells of victories against, among others, invaders from the neighboring Kingdom of Rwanda and the Belgian colonists.

=== Rulers of Kabare and other chiefdoms ===
==== Bushi Kingdom and Kabare Chiefdom ====
The Kingdom of Bushi was ruled by bami (singular mwami). These bami have, ever since the kingdom's establishment circa 1380, been from the same dynasty, and have all carried the name Nnabushi (Kabare), supplemented by a third name. There may have been up to 31 bami since the Bushi Kingdom was established, but the sources are doubtful.

The following bami ruled the Bushi Kingdom. Note that older names are traditional and doubtful and the list may be outdated:

- Nnabushi Kabare Ngabwe (? – ?) (first mwami according to tradition)
- ...
- Nnabushi Kakome (c. 1388 – ?)
- ...
- Nnabushi Chilembebwa I (? – ?)
- Nnabushi Nshuliludjo (c. 1657 – ?)
- ...
- Nnabushi Birhenjira (1760 – 1799)
- Nnabushi Buhongera (1799 – c.1809)
- Nnabushi Makombe (c.1809 – 1859)
- Nnabushi Byaterana (1859 – 1889)
- Nnabushi Rutaganda (1889 – 1919)
  - Kazi Mugenyi (regentess 1889 – 1892)
- Nnabushi Alexander Rugema (1919 – 1936)
- Nnabushi Albert Kabare I (Ntayitunda I) (1936 – 1979)
- Nnabushi Alexandre Kabare I (Rugemaninzi I) (1979)
  - Kazi (regentess 1979 – 1990)
- Nnabushi Mamimami (disputed) (1981 – 1986)
- Nnabushi Albert Kabare II (Ntayitunda II) (disputed) (1986–1990)
- Nnabushi Désiré Kabare (Rugemaninzi II) (1990 – 2024)
- Nnabushi Alexandre Kabare (Rugemaninzi III) (2024 – )

==== Other Bushi chiefdoms ====
Not only the Kabare Chiefdom, but also many other successor chiefdoms exist in the Bushi region. Some of these are formed by a different branch of the same dynasty as Kabare, while some others have different dynasties altogether.

The following list lists several Bushi successor chiefdoms, their bami and predecessors, if they are known. Note that information might be outdated:

- Idjwi Chiefdom (Idjwi Territory) – current line descents from Buhavu:
  - Current mwami: Roger Ntambuka Balekage Mihigo II (exiled) (? –)
    - Mihigo I, (? – ?)
    - Mahamiriza (1943–1960)
    - Ntambuka Barhakana (1928 – 1943; 1960 – 1972)
    - Mihigo I Ndogosa (c. 1878 – 1889; 1896 – ?)
    - Kabego (c. 1870 – ?)
    - Mwendanga (? – ?)
- Ngweshe Chiefdom (Walungu Territory) – junior line of Kabare:
  - Current mwami: Ngweshe XV Weza III Pierre J.M.J. Ndatabaye Muhigirwa (exiled) (1979 –)
    - Ngweshe XIV Muhigirwa (1936 – ?)
- Burhinyi Chiefdom (Mwenga Territory):
  - Current mwami: Mwuganda Bashengezi (1997 –)
- Kalonge Chiefdom (Kalehe Territory):
  - Current mwami: Nnakalonge Mpagama II (exiled 1998 –)
- Kaziba Chiefdom (Walungu Territory):
  - Current mwami: Majiri IV Chimanye Dirk Kabonwa Nnakaziba (2005 –)
- Luhwindja Chiefdom (Mwenga Territory):
  - Current mwami: Tony Chibwire V Nnaluhwindja (2001-)
    - Philemon Mukuba Nnaluhwindja (1988–2001)
- Nindja Chiefdom (Kabare Territory):
  - Current mwami: Nnanindja Balekembaka (exiled) (1989 –)
    - Interregnum (1979–1989)
    - Nnanindja Bertin Ndusi Ruhambuzo (? – 1979)

=== Institutional organization ===
The Bushi chiefdoms are headed by a mwamis. The Mwami exercises absolute authority over his subjects, and his person is imbued with a sacred aura, surrounded by myth and traditional reverence. Close to the Mwami is a circle of figures who form the nucleus of royal power. These include the Bajinji, descendants of the earliest Bami; the Mwamikazi, who is either the Mwami's wife or, in the event of the Mwami's incapacity, the queen mother acting as regent; the Bagula, a council of elder wise men who serve as advisers; and the Baluzi or Barhwali, who are close members of the Mwami's family. Collectively, they form the Banyamocha, the nobility of the Mwami's court.

Within the broader feudal hierarchy of Bushi society, additional categories can be distinguished. The Barhambo were politico-land chiefs, themselves descendants of the royal line, while the Bashamuka were people who held noble status and enjoyed high social esteem. At a lower level of the hierarchy were the Baganda, who acted as royal messengers, and the Balagizi, vassals or courtiers who oversaw protocol within the Mwami's palace. The general population, known as the Bashizi, were subjects who had paid the Kalinzi, a traditional fee that granted usufruct rights to the land they cultivated. Women, however, remained dependent in this social order and were often designated as Bajakazi or Bajanyere when they served as female attendants or servants within the royal court.

==== Land tenure system ====
In principle, all land within Bushi was traditionally owned by the Mwami and his clan. Inhabitants gained access to land primarily through inheritance, though alternative arrangements allowed non-clan members to secure rights of cultivation and usufruct. These arrangements were structured around three principal types of contracts: Bwasa, Kalinzi, and Bugule.

The Bwasa contract represented a short-term rental agreement, renewable annually upon the payment of a token fee that seldom exceeded the value of a goat. Such arrangements rarely fostered agricultural development, as tenants, aware that their rights could be withdrawn at any moment, were reluctant to invest in long-term improvements such as anti-erosion systems or soil enrichment through fertilizers.

The Kalinzi system, by contrast, was a long-term lease arrangement, typically negotiated through the payment of one or more cows. However, kalinzi did not constitute an outright purchase. Rather, the person offering the cow entered into a relationship of social subordination to the recipient. Within the established hierarchy, the giver of the cow became a subject of the person who received it, owing recognition, submission, and minimal contributions during significant family events such as marriages, funerals, or construction projects. While, in theory, insubordination could result in the revocation of land, such instances were uncommon. More frequently, kalinzi contracts were hereditary, passing down with their obligations and privileges intact. The Bugule represented a modern evolution of land tenure as it constituted an outright sale in which the seller permanently renounced all claims to the land. Such transactions were formalized through a written contract, leaving no ambiguity and establishing no subject–chief relationship between buyer and seller. Over time, the system of land tenure shaped patterns of migration and investment, with many commission agents from chiefdoms moving to Bukavu and extending their activities into trade and mining. The majority of their investments came to be concentrated in Bukavu.

=== 19th century ===
The 19th century marked a transformative period in the history of Bushi, shaped by the gradual evolution from fragmented polities toward centralized monarchical regimes. Although many of these centralization efforts were met with limited success, the century is particularly well-documented due to abundant oral, material, and written sources.

Politically, 19th-century Bushi was characterized by the coexistence of multiple independent states alongside emerging ambitions for regional hegemony. These dynamics gave rise to numerous internal and external tensions that destabilized the region. Fragmentation, political instability, territorial annexations, famines, and wars were recurring phenomena. One of the most notable events of the period was the second secession of the Kingdom of Kabare in 1860. Following military campaigns against the Bahavu of the north, Bigomokero, sent by his father Makombe-Kabare, proclaimed independence over the territories he had conquered, including parts of Ngweshe. His successors, particularly Karhano, attempted to reclaim or expand these territories, which then led to the formation of the Irhambi-Karhano principality. This political division was later formalized by colonial authorities in 1929–1930. Conflicts were not limited to inter-state rivalries; disputes frequently arose among Bami and rival princes, often over succession. These disputes led to frequent warfare, including notable clashes between Kabare and Ngweshe, Kaziba and Burhinyi, and Kalonge and Nindja. Such conflicts were typically motivated by the desire to seize land or conduct razzias (raids).

==== Foreign threats and regional solidarity ====
The fragmentation of Bushi was exploited by external powers, most notably the Kingdom of Rwanda under Kigeli IV Rwabugiri, which launched three invasions into Bushi during the second half of the century. However, a collective defense by the Shi states ultimately expelled Rwandan forces in 1894, and a year later, Rwabugiri died. Earlier in the century, around 1860, Mwami Muganga of Burhinyi defeated Mwami Kabuka of Lwindi. By 1890, Cimanye of Kaziba successfully defended Nyamugira (in Bufuliiru) against Arab-Swahili-led raids and defeated Bakari, a key Arab-Swahili leader, at "Rumaliza". Following this, trade with the Arab-Swahili became peaceful, with exchanges often mediated through local intermediaries. Arab forces were later repelled entirely by a coalition of Bashi from Burhinyi and refugee Balega communities.

Major territorial expansions during the 19th century included the annexation of Karhongo, later known as Nyangezi, by Chirhahorhange-Ngweshe, and the seizure of Kashanga in Bufuliiru by Kabonwa I-Nkazibaya in 1815. Northern conquests by Bigomokero extended Bushi's frontiers between the Langa and Nyabarongo rivers.

According to Jean Omasombo Tshonda et al., the suppression of the mutiny within Francis Dhanis' column led to the arrival of Europeans in Bushi. The revolt began on 14 February 1897 in Uélé, where Dhanis' force had been assigned to advance toward and occupy the Lado Enclave. Widespread food shortages provoked a revolt among African troops from the Kandolo and Saliboko groups, and resulted in the deaths of several European officers, including Melen, Adrian Binnie, and Closset, as well as African soldiers who had remained loyal to Dhanis. Although the rebels achieved temporary success for nearly two months, a counteroffensive led by Henry Morton Stanley ultimately defeated them. Many of the rebels fled southward and regrouped in the former Arab-Swahili centers of Uvira and Baraka. In June 1898, Lieutenant Charles-Adelin Glorie of the Force Publique left Shabunda Territory for Ngweshe Chiefdom after receiving intelligence from his envoys concerning the presence of rebels in the Elila and Ulindi river valleys.

Some scholars have argued that the centralized political organization of precolonial Rwanda was an exception within the African Great Lakes region. Other authors contend that this interpretation overlooks the existence of well-established autonomous polities elsewhere in the region, including the chiefdoms of Bushi and Buhavu. Although these chiefdoms differed from Rwanda in their political organization and military resistance, they maintained independent political institutions and were never conquered by the Nyinginya invasions.

Omasombo et al. noted that the Nyinginya were regarded as outsiders in Bushi, but this does not mean that no intergroup relationships existed among these different peoples. Earlier studies described these relationships under the concept of "hospitality". A Mushi visitor traveling through a territory where he had no acquaintances was received as cigolo ca mwami ("a guest received in the name of the mwami"). Travelers entering a chiefdom without local contacts were typically presented to the local chief, who was expected to provide food, lodging, and protection. If the visitor was traveling on behalf of a mwami or another muluzi (prince), he would present his credentials directly to the chief. Neighboring groups such as the Havu, Fuliru, Hunde, and Banyarwanda were generally regarded as cigolo because they shared many cultural similarities with the Bashi. More distant communities, including the Lega, Barhembo, and Bembe, were categorized as wa ekuli ("those from afar"). During the colonial period, the term Mubembe, which had originally referred specifically to people from Lembelembe, gradually came to be used more broadly for foreigners arriving in Bushi. Omasombo et al. further note that relations with people whom the Bashi had not known before Belgian rule were generally marked by caution and distrust.

==== Kabare Rutaganda and Rugema ====
The connection between a territorial space and its indigenous population remained a functional reality regardless of the size or structure of the local sociopolitical authority. Historical grievances and territorial claims were transmitted across generations and continued to shape political attitudes during the colonial period. According to oral tradition, Kabare Rutaganda responded to the advance of European colonial forces by invoking the Shi proverb Kwigomba omweru kurharhuma arhakulya ishwa ("Submitting to the White man does not prevent him from taking your land"). Another proverb attributed to him, Omuri orhakube onagunywane ("If you cannot cut down a tree, make friends with it"), reflects a pragmatic approach toward dealing with colonial authorities. Although Kabare mounted resistance against Belgian encroachment for an extended period, he also relied on negotiation to safeguard local political institutions. Despite their common opposition to colonial rule, Kabare and Ngweshe never created a unified military coalition, and each chiefdom carried out its resistance separately.

Historian Njangu Canda-Ciri notes that political rivalries between Kabare Chiefdom and Ngweshe Chiefdom remained pronounced throughout the period of resistance to European colonization. Although Kabare repeatedly sought refuge in Ngweshe during military setbacks, no joint Shi army composed of the Bahaya and Bagweshe was formed to oppose the colonial forces. Resistance to colonial conquest in Bushi lasted approximately sixteen years, during which Kabare entered into numerous blood pacts with emissaries of the new colonial authorities, who ultimately prevailed over him.

Once Kabare Rutaganda was restored to the throne and Nyalukemba was rejected by the colonial authorities, this amounted to recognition of the prior legitimacy of Kabare's authority. It symbolically allowed Bushi to retain a tributary-style customary authority with which it still identifies today. Nevertheless, the region's current administrative divisions had already undergone several changes during the period of resistance. These changes were not imposed solely by the will of the new colonial state. Despite its military superiority, the colonial administration was compelled to negotiate and make concessions to consolidate its presence. Although Kabare had been sought and pursued by the colonial authorities, he was never imprisoned or executed when he appeared before them. The Europeans had recognized his importance and the significance of his role in achieving their objectives.

After Kabare's death in January 1919, his son Rugema (Ngabwe III), also known as Alexandre Kabare Rugemaninzi, succeeded him while still a minor. He was officially installed as mwami in May 1919, but his accession took place under close colonial supervision and required him to adopt a conciliatory relationship with the Belgian administration and the other local chiefs. Even before his enthronement, Rugema sought to cultivate relations with the Catholic missionaries established at the Katana groupement of Kabare Chiefdom by sending greetings and presenting them with a bull in February 1919. After his enthronement, he sent another gift to the Katana missionaries and, in July 1919, paid his first official visit to the superior of the Katana mission. During this period, neither the mwami nor his envoys could travel without a travel permit issued by the administrator stationed at Nyalukemba (modern-day Bukavu). The missionaries took advantage of this situation to persuade Rugema to cooperate with the colonial administration and to respect the boundaries established in 1917, since his accession to power would require a reorganization of his administrative personnel.

Rugema was also required to negotiate arrangements with his neighboring political authorities, including the leaders of Katana-Kalibanya and Ngweshe. Following the establishment of the Kazinzi River as the boundary between Kabare Chiefdom and Ngweshe Chiefdom, the colonial administration required the newly enthroned mwami to conclude a blood pact with the ruler of Ngweshe Chiefdom. Canda-Ciri argues that this requirement carried considerable symbolic significance. In his interpretation, it not only placed Ngweshe Chiefdom on an equal footing with Kabare Chiefdom but also departed from established Shi custom, under which blood pacts were not ordinarily concluded between members of the same lineage or between closely related rulers. Canda-Ciri also notes that these arrangements were imposed while Rugema was still young and politically inexperienced.

In November 1919, the colonial administration organized a reconciliation ceremony intended to formalize relations between the new mwami, neighboring chiefs, and the colonial authorities. The meeting took place at the Catholic mission in Katana rather than at the royal residence of Kabare Chiefdom. According to Canda-Ciri, the choice of venue symbolized the transfer of political authority away from the customary court toward the colonial administration and the missionary establishment. On the eve of the ceremony, Rugema and his entourage traveled to Katana, where Chief Katana welcomed them by slaughtering a bull. While this act may be interpreted as a gesture of deference, it has also been understood as an expression of customary hospitality. Canda-Ciri argues that the ceremony moved from customary political protocol, as under Shi tradition, a subordinate chief would normally visit and pay homage to the supreme chief rather than receive him. In his view, requiring Rugema to negotiate relations with subordinate chiefs at Katana reflected the extent to which colonial authorities had reshaped existing political hierarchies. He also maintains that, during Rugema's minority, long-standing ambitions to assert Kabare's supremacy over neighboring chiefdoms gradually disappeared as colonial administrative structures assumed increasing authority. Although the mwami continued to receive the ceremonial honors associated with customary leadership, effective administrative power increasingly rested with colonial officials, who issued directives directly to local notables.

According to Canda-Ciri, Rugema's relationship with the colonial administration worsened after he reached political maturity and freed himself from the influence of his guardian, Ciraba. He subsequently opposed Belgian authority, but his resistance lacked the broad support that had characterized earlier campaigns led by his father. Canda-Ciri describes these actions as those of a ruler whose authority had been progressively constrained by colonial rule, and culminating in his exile in 1936.

==== Economic developments ====
Bushi transitioned from a barter-based economy to a monetary economy during the 19th century. Despite intermittent warfare, southern and southwestern Bushi experienced relative economic prosperity, fueled by commerce and artisanal production and further enhanced by contact with Arab-Swahili traders. Even prior to external trade contacts, some Bushi states, especially Kaziba, engaged in long-distance trade, importing livestock from Rwanda and Burundi, mineral salt and iron from Bufuliiru, ivory, rubber, parrots from Bulega, pearls, cotton goods, salt, and dried fish introduced by the Arab-Swahili. In exchange, the Bashi exported hoes, brass wire bracelets (known as burhege and used as currency), leather goods, weapons, foodstuffs, and occasionally slaves. Trade operations were regulated through a variety of mechanisms, including standardized marketplaces, shared currencies, long-distance caravans (sometimes exceeding 50 people), legal arbitration systems, and loan structures among trading partners. These arrangements facilitated not only economic complementarity but also cultural cohesion among Bushi states and their neighbors. Artisans trained local and foreign novices, while merchants introduced new languages and customs throughout the region. This exchange helped break down ethnic prejudices, such as the myth of Balega-Babembe cannibalism, and promoted interethnic marriages, including between Bashi men and foreign women.
