= Timeline of the M23 campaign (2025) =

This timeline of the M23 campaign (2022–present) covers the period from late-April 2025 to December 2025.

== May 2025 ==
=== 30 April–1 May ===
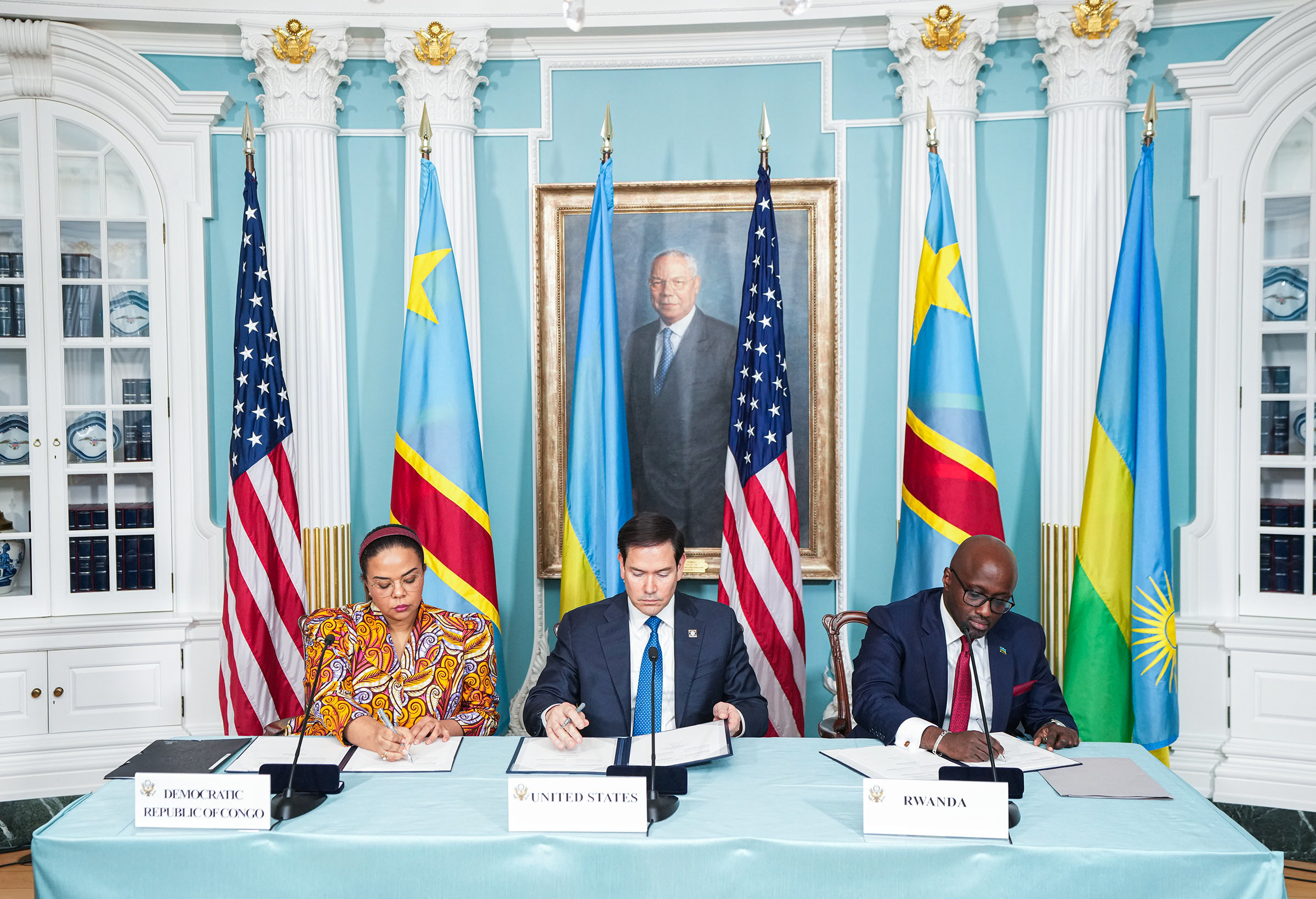
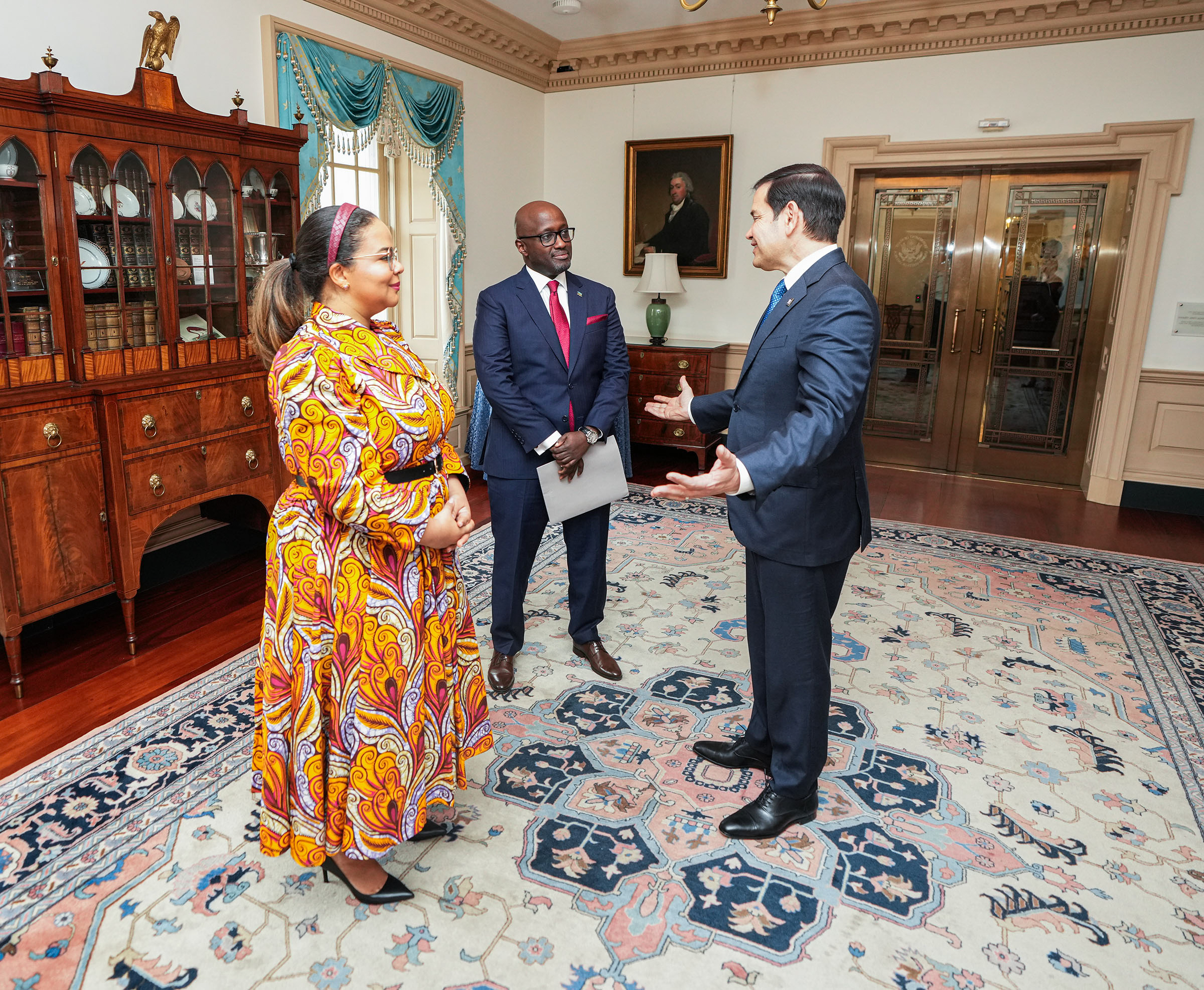
Secretary Marco Rubio presiding over a Declaration of Principles signing ceremony with Congolese Foreign Minister Thérèse Kayikwamba Wagner and Rwandan Foreign Minister Olivier Nduhungirehe at the U.S. Department of State in Washington, D.C., on 25 April 2025

On 30 April 2025, Congolese Justice Minister publicly declared in Kinshasa that he had procured "tangible evidence" implicating Joseph Kabila in collusion with M23 and accused him of treason, war crimes, and massacres of civilians and soldiers. He added that judicial proceedings await Senate approval to prosecute Kabila and seize his assets as a precaution. In response, Kabila, Moïse Katumbi, Martin Fayulu, and Delly Sesanga issued a joint communiqué calling for an inclusive national dialogue, supported by the Conférence Épiscopale Nationale du Congo (CENCO) and the Église du Christ au Congo (ECC), and appealed for international engagement in the peace process. While welcoming the United States and Qatari peace efforts, they argued these alone were insufficient for lasting peace and emphasized the need for broad Congolese participation. They also raised concerns about a possible U.S.–DRC minerals deal, demanding full transparency, and called for the withdrawal of all foreign fighters and the return of displaced persons. Meanwhile, Massad Boulos, Senior Advisor for Africa to U.S. President Donald Trump, informed Reuters that France, Qatar, Togo, and the United States had established a joint security mechanism to monitor progress in the DRC and Rwanda toward implementing a peace agreement grounded in the Declaration of Principles signed on 25 April. Boulos stated that finalizing U.S.–DRC and U.S.–Rwanda economic agreements is a precondition for signing the broader peace deal. He noted that significant investment interest from Western firms, estimated in the billions of U.S. dollars, depended on the ratification of these agreements. Boulos also reiterated that peace requires Rwanda's military withdrawal and the severance of its support for M23, while the DRC must respond to Rwanda's security concerns regarding anti-Rwandan militias. These conditions were expected to be resolved before the provisional peace agreement scheduled for signing on 2 May.

On 1 May, FARDC and Wazalendo in the city of Uvira. Clashes began around 05:00 in the Kasenga quartier and quickly extended to Kakombe and surrounding hill areas. The outbreak of violence reportedly stemmed from a dispute over FARDC troop deployments to strategic high ground near existing Wazalendo positions. The FARDC intensified its military presence as intermittent gunfire persisted into the late morning.

=== 2 May ===
On 2 May, Wazalendo launched a surprise attack on M23 in Kashovu, Bahunde Chiefdom in Masisi Territory, which is situated approximately 26 miles south of Rubaya. They briefly drove out M23 rebels before being pushed back by a counteroffensive. That same day in Kinshasa, Prime Minister Judith Suminwa welcomed the first group of Congolese military and police personnel, along with their families, who had sought refuge in United Nations Organization Stabilization Mission in the Democratic Republic of the Congo (MONUSCO) compounds in Goma following the January M23 incursion into the city. Meanwhile, in Lubero Territory, M23 and Rwandan forces seized Lunyasenge, a town on Lake Edward's western shore, advancing both by land, from Vutsumbi and Kamandi Gite, and across the lake. Lunyasenge, a key fishing point four hours by boat from Kyavinyonge, sits along vital routes toward Butembo, Beni Territory, and the Uganda border via Kasindi-Lubiriha. Heavy clashes with FARDC followed, and images posted online showed FARDC casualties. The exact death toll remains indeterminate, but the town's capture triggered a significant civilian displacement.

=== 3–4 May ===
On 3 May, FARDC officers deployed to Kyavinyonge to coordinate a counter-response as residents evacuated fisheries including Musenda and Kisaka, fleeing toward Kyavinyonge, Mubana, or Kasindi. Joël Vyalengekanya, who leads the Union of Shipowners, Individual Fishermen, and Environmentalists of Kyavinyonge, reported that the Ugandan navy intercepted nearly 70 Congolese fishermen and seized more than 200 canoe engines in recent months. On 4 May, South African Minister of Defence Thandi Modise initiated the withdrawal of South African troops from the DRC, which marked the beginning of the drawdown of forces deployed under SAMIDRC. In Lubero Territory, FARDC spokesperson Colonel Mak Hazukay confirmed Lunyasenge's fall, condemning it as a "flagrant violation of the ceasefire", and cautioned that FARDC may retaliate if the rebels and their Rwandan allies keep advancing. Meanwhile, heavy fighting erupted in Bwito Chiefdom, Lubwe Sud, Businene, Kabizo, and Mutanga, between CMC/FDP-affiliated Wazalendo groups and M23 fighters. Some reports said Wazalendo forces managed to repel the M23, though both parties incurred losses, and the exact number of casualties remains unconfirmed.

=== 5–6 May ===
On 5 May, M23 retook Kabizo, a town it had abandoned five to six months earlier. In Rutshuru Territory, M23 and RDF control key areas like Nroroba and parts of Tongo groupement, including the strategic Kanaba-Mulimbi axis linking Tongo and Kitshanga, while Wazalendo holds Bambo groupement. The same day, the DRC and Rwanda submitted a draft peace proposal under the Washington-led Declaration of Principles. Boulos welcomed the step as progress toward peace. Meanwhile, Wazalendo launched surprise attacks on M23 in Katogota and Kamanyola, which triggered clashes that lasted eight hours in Rutebe, Kayange, and Luzinzi, as well as leaving casualties on both sides and injuring civilians. In Bwito Chiefdom, a mishandled rocket by a local fighter exploded in a market in Bambo groupement, killing four people, including two women and a child, and injuring several others. On 6 May, M23 forces captured Luciga village in the mineral-rich Luhwinja Chiefdom, within Mwenga Territory, where Canadian-owned BANRO once operated before being acquired by Chinese-aligned corporations. The advance followed a brief clash in Lwashanja village, which M23 overtook before proceeding into Luciga. They then maneuvered toward BANRO's operational zones while simultaneously encircling the broader territory via Ngando and Chihumba-Kashanga, using Mparanyi as an entry point. Reports suggest that M23 militants dispersed into various villages, occupying four groupements, Luchiga, Kabalole, Luduha, and Idudwe, and received logistical reinforcements and arms shipments. Observers later sighted M23 units near the Twangiza mining site in Luchiga, having crossed the Lulimbohwe River to Buhamba, situated fewer than five kilometers from the processing facility. Luhwinja Chiefdom eventually fell with little resistance, marking M23's first foothold in Mwenga Territory after two days of fighting Wazalendo.

=== 8–9 May ===
On 8 May, Twangiza Mining halted operations due to the rebel presence. That day, ICRC President Mirjana Spoljaric Egger concluded her first official visit to the DRC, meeting with senior officials in Kinshasa to discuss humanitarian challenges and the logistical transfer of hundreds of unarmed FARDC and Congolese National Police (PNC) personnel and their families from Goma to the capital.

On 9 May, Togolese president of the Council of Ministers Faure Gnassingbé met with a Qatari delegation to strengthen bilateral ties and mediate the Rwanda-DRC crisis. In Entebbe, Congolese Deputy Prime Minister Vital Kamerhe met with Ugandan President Yoweri Museveni to discuss eastern DRC's security, as part of a broader parliamentary mission focused on regional cooperation. In Kinshasa, the European Union's ambassador to the DRC Nicolás Berlanga-Martinez reaffirmed support for peace efforts and stressed the need for monitoring mechanisms. He also addressed EU-DRC partnerships, noting the DRC's right to explore ties with other nations, including the U.S.

=== 10–11 May ===
On 10 May, violence escalated in Goma: Shagali Rushingwa was fatally shot in his home in Ndosho; two additional corpses were found in Kyeshero and Himbi; six people were wounded by gunfire in Katoyi and Mabanga North; and three decomposed corpses were discovered in a pit between Kasika and Mabanga Sud, showing signs of murder under unclear circumstances. M23 also conducted a cordon-and-search operation in Ndosho, resulting in the apprehension of dozens of people subsequently presented to the public at Stade de l'Unité in Karisimbi commune. M23 spokespersons claimed that some detainees were FARDC, Wazalendo, or FDLR members allegedly hiding among civilians.

On 11 May, four members of a single household were fatally shot and burned in their home in Kabale Katambi, located in the Rusayo groupement of Bukumu Chiefdom, during a raid by armed men clad in military uniforms. Later that evening, a young shopkeeper was killed in the Turunga neighboring. Additional sweep operations were launched by M23 units in the Rukoko and Katalengwa localities, which demarcate the boundary between Goma and Nyiragongo Territory.

=== 12–13 May ===
On 12 May, a body was recovered in the Katoyi quartier of Karisimbi, and an M23-related shooting in Kyeshero left one driver dead and another wounded. M23's dominion over Goma and Nyiragongo Territory intensified as its combatants enforced curfews and conducted intrusive domiciliary inspections. On the Mugunga–Sake axis, within Masisi Territory, a military cordon was instituted. Roughly 2,000 people were arrested by M23 in Sake, and forcibly transferred to Goma, where a large number were subsequently deported to Rwanda. Despite possessing Congolese IDs, M23 burned the documents and forcibly deported 181 Hutu men, labeling them as "illegal Rwandan nationals". Arrests also proliferated throughout densely populated neighborhoods in Goma's northern zones, including Buhene, Don Bosco, Virunga, Katoyi, Kilijiwe, and Office 1. On 13 May, M23 forces arrested approximately 100 people from the adjacent villages of Ngangi 2 and Ngangi 3, positioned near the Goma–Nyiragongo boundary. Detainees were reportedly held on diverse grounds, ranging from alleged affiliations with the FARDC or Wazalendo to the absence of identification credentials, or due to subjective markers of nonconformity, including the presence of dreadlocks. The detainees were transported to Don Bosco Stadium in Nyiragongo Territory, where M23 forces reportedly conducted individualized interrogations. Those who successfully substantiated their noninvolvement were released, while others were transferred to undisclosed locations. These operations severely disrupted civilian life, preventing many from accessing their workplaces and threatening the livelihoods of affected families. In Walikale Territory, during an M23-led search operation, rebels apprehended and subsequently executed two civilians in Kibati, within the Luberike groupement of Wanianga Sector, amid a market raid. Simultaneously, in Kalehe Territory, hostilities flared along the Kasheke-Lemera axis where Wazalendo repelled M23 units, forcing their withdrawal from Katasomwa to the port zones of Kasheke and Tchofi. In Nyiragongo Territory, a MONUSCO convoy en route from Munigi (Bukumu Chiefdom) to Kitchanga suffered a fatal accident when one vehicle veered off the road and fell into a ravine, killing a Moroccan peacekeeper from the Moroccan Rapid Deployment Battalion (MORRDB) and a Congolese language assistant. Four other Moroccan troops were injured and hospitalized in Goma.

=== 14–15 May ===
On 14 May, renewed clashes erupted across Kalehe Territory. Bolstered by reinforcements from Bukavu and Goma and supplied with munitions, M23 launched operations to dislodge Wazalendo along National Road 2, a key route that links Bukavu to Goma. Civilians fled to the islets of Ihoka and Ishovu, while others sought refuge in Kajuchu in the neighboring Kabare Territory. A report by the Goma and Karisimbi communal youth councils, covering the period from 25 April to 10 May, recorded at least 15 deaths, 110 homes attacked, nine bodies found, four kidnappings, six gunshot injuries, and three cases of mob justice, mainly in the neighborhoods of Mugunga, Ndosho, Kasika, Mabanga, Bujovu, Lac-Vert, Kyeshero, Himbi, Katindo, and Mapendo. Victims were reportedly targeted by M23 in military uniform. On 15 May, the Senate began reviewing an indictment request against President Kabila, not as former president, but as senator for life. The military prosecutor accused him of aiding M23's expansion through political and logistical support, citing remarks he made in a February 2025 Sunday Times interview praising the group, and his plans to re-enter DRC via M23-held areas. Key testimony came from Éric Nkuba Shebandu, a former advisor to Corneille Nangaa, who claimed to overhear Kabila in May 2023 advising Rwanda to destabilize President Tshisekedi politically rather than assassinate him. Kabila faces charges of insurrection, treason, war crimes complicity, and breaching legal duties tied to his former office. A Senate committee was formed to review the case within 72 hours, though internal disagreement emerged. Many legal experts and civil society voices argue that only Congress, not the Senate, can lift a former president's immunity under current law. That night, two local officers were murdered by unidentified gunmen on CEAVI Avenue in the Mugunga neighborhood of Karisimbi.

=== 16–18 May ===
On 16 May, four people were killed and several injured in an armed attack on a pharmacy in Katoyi, Goma. The following day, M23 rebels attacked Wazalendo positions in Butare (Tongo groupement) and Koojo (Bukombo groupement) in Bwito Chiefdom. These clashes followed intense fighting in Bambo and Mutanda, where civilian casualties had been reported. That day, President Gnassingbé hosted AU mediators in Lomé to unify peace efforts for eastern DRC. Former leaders including Oluṣẹgun Ọbasanjọ, Uhuru Kenyatta, Mokgweetsi Masisi, Catherine Samba-Panza, and Sahle-Work Zewde pledged to merge the Nairobi and Luanda processes and coordinate with EAC, SADC, and Qatar. On 18 May, nine civilians were injured by shrapnel in Rukamba and Kagano in Rutshuru Territory amid M23–Wazalendo clashes. Rebel forces reportedly launched explosive projectiles from their positions in Kahunga, situated within Virunga National Park, targeting the towns of Kirumba and Kagando approximately 30 kilometers away. Meanwhile, in Masisi Territory, three civilians lost their lives and ten others sustained injuries during a violent incident in Katoyi. The assailant, allegedly intoxicated, was identified as a member of Obedi Makuba's faction. The shooting stemmed from an internal dispute with PARECO over the control of unauthorized roadblocks, which escalated into gunfire.

=== 19–23 May ===
On 19 May, the Senate Bureau appointed a 40-member special committee, chaired by Christophe Lutundula, to assess Kabila's indictment. The panel had three days to complete its closed-door probe. Kabila, reportedly abroad, was summoned for 20 May but did not respond. Meanwhile, insecurity persisted in M23-controlled areas. Overnight on 19–20 May, three people were killed: Augustin Miruho was fatally shot during a home invasion in Bugamba (Nyiragongo Territory); an unidentified body was found near CBCA Hospital in Kyeshero (Hôpital CBCA); and a suspected burglar was killed near Anuarite High School, while his accomplice fled.

Also on 19 May, 786 Rwandan refugees were repatriated through Goma's Grande Barrière border post in an operation coordinated by the United Nations High Commissioner for Refugees (UNHCR) and M23. Most of these refugees had fled Rwanda during the 1994 genocide and had been residing in a displacement camp in Sake since M23 seized Goma in January. Security sources indicated that M23 obstructed their return to Karhenga and forcibly sent them back to Rwanda. Simultaneously, in Walikale Territory, M23 rebels allegedly arrested and beat a man to death in Kashebere, though the motive remains unclear. On 22 May, the Senate lifted Kabila's lifetime immunity, with a vote tally of 88 in favor, 5 abstentions, and 3 total votes. Meanwhile, the UNHCR continued repatriation efforts, sending back another 610 Rwandan refugees, which raised the total number to 1,710. On 23 May, Kabila addressed the nation online, calling the crisis "deep and multidimensional", and criticized Kinshasa for acting on false reports of his presence in Goma.

=== 24–25 May ===
On 24 May, violence surged in Goma: a motorcycle taxi driver was shot in Virunga, a lynching occurred in Himbi, and a commissioner's son was killed in Ndosho. In Lac Vert, armed assailants looted a home, sexually assaulted and abducted a girl named Dorcas, and tortured volunteers responding to the attack. On 25 May, M23 launched attacks on Wazalendo and FARDC positions in Lushebere, between Kishishe and Kirima in Bwito Chiefdom, after advancing along the Lushebere–Kishishe–Bambo axis. Approximately ten bodies were recovered in Kirumba, Rukano, and Kagambi, border villages between the Tongo and Bambo groupements, several of the victims were reportedly killed in their homes or yards. Five additional civilians sustained injuries during the attacks. That same day, Kabila was confirmed to have arrived in M23-controlled Goma, a development acknowledged by rebel leadership. The youth-led Ligue Civile de Défense de la Patrie (LCDP) denounced Kabila's arrival, characterizing it as a betrayal and accusing the former president of aligning with hostile forces against the nation.

=== 26–28 May ===
On 26 May, clashes resumed in Virunga National Park near Kibingu and Runzenze in the Bambo groupement, as M23 targeted Wazalendo and FDLR fighters, raiding villages and displacing more civilians toward Bambo. In Walikale Territory, M23 seized control of Bukumbirwa, Rusamambu, Kilambo, and Ngengere in Muronga locality (Ikobo groupement), following engagements with Wazalendo forces, who retreated to Misinga. Local leaders condemned the advance as a violation of the ceasefire meant to support ongoing peace initiatives. In Goma, Dr. Paluku Musumba Obadi, chief medical officer of Karisimbi health zone, was seriously injured in a shooting at his home in Virunga, hit in the hip, back, and foot, and later died from his injuries in Nairobi on 5 July. On 27 May, Amnesty International issued a report condemning M23 for committing human rights violations in Goma and Bukavu, including the extrajudicial execution of civilians, torture, and the abuse of detainees. The report described the use of incommunicado detention in unsanitary conditions, denial of food, water, and medical care, and the arbitrary arrest of individuals accused, often without evidence, of supporting government forces, collaborating with civil society, or criticizing M23. Some individuals were also reportedly subjected to forced recruitment. Amnesty documented cases in which families were required to pay ransoms exceeding $2,000 to secure the release of detainees. That same day in Masisi Territory, at least 12 decomposed bodies were discovered in the village of Kiringi. The victims were believed to be civilians killed during the 23 May clashes between M23 and Wazalendo. Several homes were also reported burned during the violence. In Bwito Chiefdom, clashes between M23 rebels and local armed groups intensified in the villages of the Tongo groupement, Marangara, Rukarara, Kabingu, and in villages near the Bambu groupement, injuring at least two civilians, including an 11-year-old girl who was hit by a stray bullet. That same day, at least 29 civilians who had been killed over the preceding six days were interred in the villages of Kirumba, Lukarara, Rukano, and Kagando, situated within the Tongo and Bambo groupements, with an additional six victims buried in Runzenze. The violence also destroyed homes and settlements, looted livestock and belongings, and saw young villagers taken hostage by M23 to carry stolen goods.

On 28 May, Wazalendo forces from the Coalition des Mouvements pour le Changement (CMC) launched an offensive in Ngerere to retake Rusamambu, Bukumbirwa, Kishonjia, and Kilambo. By 30 May, M23 had seized several villages in Walikale Territory after intense clashes, capturing all six villages of Ikobo groupement, Iremya, Mirungi, Kanune, Banamuronga, Kalehe, and Kitanda, and establishing positions in Irimba, Kanune, Rusamambu, Bukumbirwa, Kilambo, and Busunzu. The rebels also advanced into Kisimba groupement, seizing Musambo, Kyanjikiro, Katobo, Ihula, Mbukuru, Mukohwa, Ngambi, and Buhimba, raising fears they aim to encircle and capture Pinga. Wazalendo forces retreated to Kashukano, Kisone, and Busaka.

== June 2025 ==
=== 1 June ===
On 1 June, Radio Okapi reported that from 26–31 May, 38 civilians, including women and children, were killed in Mutanda groupement under M23 control. At least 543 houses were burned by M23 rebels accusing residents of FDLR ties, while Wazalendo retaliated by torching homes in Butare village, alleging support for M23. In Goma, residents discovered a gunshot-wounded body in a small bush on the western outskirts of the Karisimbi's Mugunga neighborhood, and witnesses, who said the victim was part of a Christian group praying on a nearby hill where M23 rebels had reportedly blocked access, suspect that M23 fighters were responsible.

=== 2–5 June ===
In diplomatic developments, the DRC was elected Vice-President of the 80th United Nations General Assembly on 2 June. That same day, at least 18 people, including students, were abducted during clashes between M23 and Wazalendo fighters in Fizi village, in the Mbinga-Sud groupement, Kalehe Territory. In Goma, a young girl's body was found in Les Volcans, and in Karisimbi's Katoyi neighborhood, a suspected thief was lynched and burned by local youths. The U.S., France, Belgium, Switzerland, Germany, the Netherlands, Norway, Sweden, Japan, Canada, Great Britain, and the EU expressed deep concern over the worsening challenges faced by humanitarian actors in eastern DRC, condemned the M23's illegal imposition of taxes, and urged all parties, including the Congolese government and armed groups, to allow aid delivery to affected populations. However, tensions rose on 3 June when the Expanded Joint Verification Mechanism (Mécanisme Conjoint de Vérification Élargi, MCVE), a regional monitoring body under the International Conference on the Great Lakes Region (ICGLR), held a meeting in Goma with M23 representatives. The Congolese government condemned the meeting as a breach of peace agreements with the DRC embassy in Burundi issuing a formal request for clarification from the ICGLR. That day, Human Rights Watch reported that M23 executed at least 21 civilians in Goma on 22-23 February. Meanwhile, Christian Bosembe, president of the Conseil Supérieur de l'Audiovisuel et de la Communication (CSAC), announced that Congolese media outlets are banned from reporting on President Kabila or the activities of PPRD.

On 4 June, the DRC was elected as a non-permanent member of the United Nations Security Council for the 2026–2027 term, receiving 183 of 187 votes. On the ground, armed violence continued as a money transfer agent in the Goma commune's Himbi neighborhood was fatally shot in broad daylight by unidentified armed men who stole a bag containing a large amount of money. Between 4 and 5 June, Wazalendo forces ousted M23 rebels from Mabingu, a village on the Kabare–Kalehe border. The conflict soon spread to four villages in the Mubuku groupement of Buhavu Chiefdom, including Murangu and Chirimiro, as well as the Kachikauma and Mushunguti road corridors. As they retreated, M23 rebels conducted mass arrests near Kahuzi-Biéga National Park, killing one civilian and injuring a woman and an 11-year-old girl. Raids continued along the Kasheke axis, forcing residents of Tchofi, Kasheke, and Luzira in the Mbinga Sud groupement to flee to Idjwi Island, Kajuchu, and the islets of Ihoka and Ishovu. That same day, a woman's body was found in the Goma commune's Lac Vert neighborhood.

=== 6–7 June ===
On 6 June, FARDC and Wazalendo captured the strategically important hill of Nkobe in Kisimba groupement, Walikale Territory, following intense fighting. The hill provides oversight of the villages of Kalinga and Kisone, both of which were also taken by government forces. M23 subsequently withdrew to Ikobo, where they fortified positions in Rusamambu and Bukumbirwa. On the same day, NBC News published a report alleging that Rwanda had secretly deployed more than 5,000 troops into eastern DRC in support of the M23 rebellion. The report, based on satellite imagery, leaked documents, and eyewitness accounts, claimed Rwanda had established military bases inside DRC territory, supplied heavy weaponry, and disguised its soldiers to avoid detection. The report also accused Rwanda of concealing its battlefield casualties. On 7 June, M23 forces reportedly looted essential equipment from the Lemera tea factory in Kalehe Territory, transporting machinery used for cultivating, harvesting, and drying tea to an undisclosed location.

=== 8–10 June ===
On 8 June, Rwanda withdrew from the Economic Community of Central African States (ECCAS), a move that coincided with stalled peace talks aimed at resolving the security crisis in eastern DRC. The withdrawal was widely perceived as indicative of Rwanda's diminishing diplomatic leverage, particularly given mounting evidence of its support for the M23 insurgency and its military operations within DRC borders. Several media outlets deliberated on the ramifications of Rwanda's actions, with some emphasizing the successes of Congolese diplomacy, while others questioned the political future of President Kagame both domestically and internationally. On 9 June, the CSAC issued an edict forbidding the media from broadcasting information pertaining to the activities of the aggressors and their M23 affiliates. On 10 June, the US issued a demand for Rwanda to withdraw its troops from eastern DRC before a peace agreement could be signed. However, heavy fighting ensued in Rutshuru and Walikale Territories, during which a 10-year-old girl was killed in Nyamilima (Rutshuru Territory), and approximately ten homes were damaged by bomb shrapnel. M23 rebels arrested several civilians after Wazalendo forces retreated, and in Mulema (Walikale Territory) and Mugogo (Rutshuru Territory), more homes were burned, displacing many residents. Between 18 May and 10 June, over 600 houses were destroyed, at least 75 people killed, and 42 injured across more than 26 villages in Bwito Chiefdom, particularly in the Bukombo, Tongo, and Bambo groupements.

=== 11–12 June ===
On 11 June, thousands of customers at the M23-operated CADECO bank in Goma struggled to access their savings due to the suspension of withdrawal services since the beginning of June. Only deposits were allowed, though minimal deposits were made. The bank, nearly devoid of funds, attributed its cash shortage after serving April–May clients, limited access to Central Bank reserves, and a dearth of new deposit activity. On 12 June, Bintou Keita, the DRC's Special Representative of the Secretary-General and head of MONUSCO, arrived in Goma, where she met with MONUSCO personnel, local organizations, including women's groups, and M23 representatives to discuss the priorities of MONUSCO's mandate, particularly the protection of civilians. In Sake, M23 rebels arrested over 150 youths during a forced cordon operation. In Butembo, FARDC captured a self-proclaimed general, Kasereka Kasiano, also known as Kabido, leader of the armed group Front des patriotes pour la paix – Armée du peuple (FPP-AP), although the military didn't make a public statement. Authorities describe him as a longtime feared Mai-Mai commander in Lubero Territory and Beni Territory who pledged allegiance to M23 in March.

=== 16–18 June ===
On 16 June, clashes between M23 rebels and CMC broke out on the hills of Bumbasha and Bunkuba, located 10 kilometers from Mwesso, in the Bukombo groupement of Bwito Chiefdom, resulting in widespread displacement. In Bukavu, a group of more than twelve armed assailants raided the home of the Mâcha Balemba family in the Ndendere neighborhood of Ibanda, torturing the occupants and stealing large sums of money, gold, phones, and other valuables. The victims sustained injuries from bullets, machetes, and knives. Volker Türk, the UNHCR, condemned the scale of abuses in eastern DRC as "serious", "alarming", and of "appalling magnitude". On 17 June, clashes in Mushebere (Rutshuru Territory) between CMC and M23 left 18 homes burned, a health center torched in Kanyatsi, and a local dignitary arrested. In Walungu Territory, six staff members from the NGO V-Day were abducted by M23 amid a broader offensive that provoked widespread displacement. Meanwhile, in Kabare Territory, four bodies, three wrapped in bags floating on Lake Kivu, were found alongside three AK-47 rifles without magazines.

On 18 June, HRW called on Rwanda and M23 for an immediate end to the forced transfers of Congolese civilians and Rwandan refugees, characterizing these actions as war crimes. Over 1,500 people have reportedly been forcibly deported in violation of Article 49 of the Fourth Geneva Convention, which prohibits the transfer of civilians from occupied territories, regardless of motive. That same day, Congolese and Rwandan experts in Washington, D.C., signed a preliminary peace deal, paving the way for a formal agreement scheduled for final ratification on 27 June, pending approval by both countries' foreign ministers. Meanwhile, fighting escalated in Kabare Territory as Wazalendo attempted to push back M23 in Cirunga, Mumosho, and Katana, leaving two dead in Cirunga. Simultaneously, in Walikale Territory, battles between M23 and Wazalendo-aligned militiamen from the Collectif des Mouvements pour le Changement/Force d'Autodéfense du Peuple Congolais (CMC/FAPC), commanded by self-styled General Jonas Bigabo, sparked mass displacement in Ikobo groupement, with residents fleeing Kateku, Buleusa, and Bukumbirwa after deadly clashes. Civilian casualties were reported, though the full toll remains unknown.

=== 19–21 June ===
On 20 June, UPDF Chief of Defence Forces Muhoozi Kainerugaba met with FARDC Chief of Staff Jules Banza Mwilambwe in Kinshasa to assess the joint military operation Shujaa against the ADF and to review the Memorandum of Understanding (MoU) governing cooperation in North Kivu and Ituri, including road reconstruction efforts along the Kasindi–Beni–Kisangani axis. The revised MoU expands operations into Mambasa and targets armed groups in Djugu, Irumu, Mahagi, and Aru. Despite M23's coercive cordon enforcement operations across Goma, rampant banditry persists, as that day in Karisimbi, Germain Kakule Issevalwana Ngwabi, the chief of Bulende Avenue, was assassinated near his residence in the Kasika neighborhood by armed assailants who arrived in a taxi, fired multiple rounds, and subsequently robbed nearby civilians before fleeing the scene. Elsewhere, assailants on motorcycles launched an armed assault on currency exchangers operating near the Mutinga station, straddling the Katoyi and Majengo neighborhoods, injuring two people and stealing cash before discharging their weapons indiscriminately to incite chaos. This incident marked the third such motorcycle-borne robbery in Goma that week. In Masisi Territory, Wazalendo launched an offensive against M23 positions in Kasopo, with clashes continuing into 21 June. Eight Wazalendo fighters were injured, while M23 casualties remain unknown.

=== 22–26 June ===
On 22 June, FARDC reported the extrajudicial execution of 17 civilians in Munzinzi village, Ngweshe Chiefdom, by RDF–M23 forces, who also torched homes and caused mass displacement. FARDC condemned the act as a "pogrom" and called for vigilance. In Rutshuru Territory, the CMC denounced artillery strikes on several towns, including Nyarubande, Burambo, Muhanga, Kihondo-center, and Kiyeye, pledging retribution. Clashes also flared near Katsiru between M23 and CMC. On 23 June, CMC attacked M23-held Nyabiondo in Masisi Territory, prompting return fire and widespread panic. That same day, two unidentified bodies were found in Sake and Kimoka after reported gunfire between M23 and unknown assailants. In Rutshuru Territory, M23 and CMC forces clashed across Bambo, Bukombo, and Tongo in Bwito Chiefdom, leaving two dead and four injured, including civilians. In Mushebere village, 18 houses were set ablaze and half the population fled. Local civil society in Bambo observed that M23's objective was to capture CMC-controlled Kiyeye, securing the vital Nyarubande–Mweso road for the expansion of their military operations. On 24 June, CMC forces attacked M23 positions in Kashuga and Kalembe/Kalonge near the Walikale–Masisi border but retreated, leaving M23 in control. Similarly, M23 launched multiple artillery strikes on the villages of Katsiru, Kavumu, and Birambizo, targeting Kiyeye.

On 26 June, the African Court on Human and Peoples' Rights ruled in favor of the DRC, rejecting Rwanda's preliminary objections and affirming its jurisdiction to adjudicate the Congolese state's claims of human rights violations, military aggression, and mass atrocities in the eastern region. This legal milestone opened the door to formal investigations and marked the first formal judicial inquiry by a continental body into inter-state allegations between African nations. Rwanda was granted 90 days to submit its defense, while Congolese officials hailed the ruling as a key step toward justice and accountability.

=== 27–30 June ===
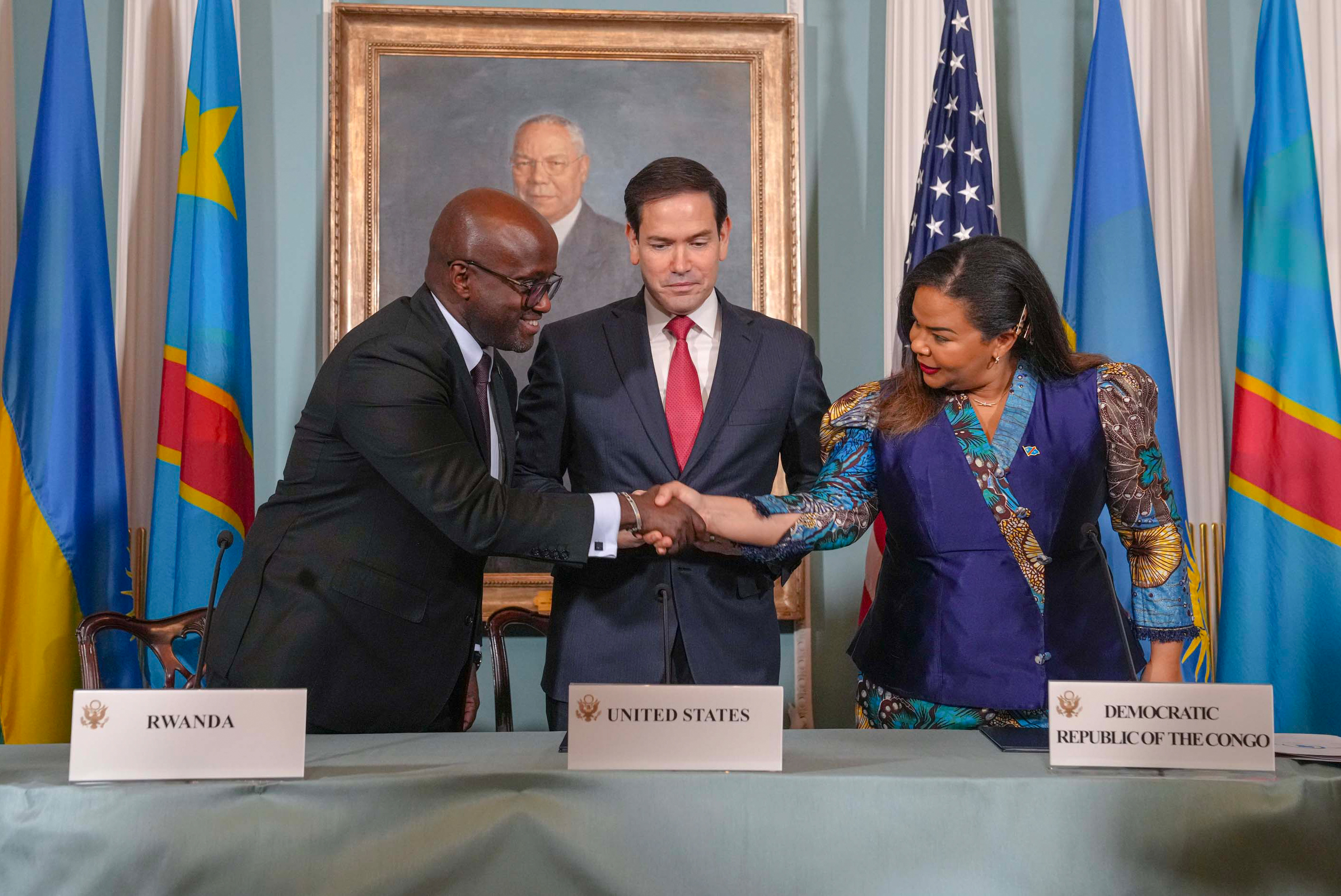
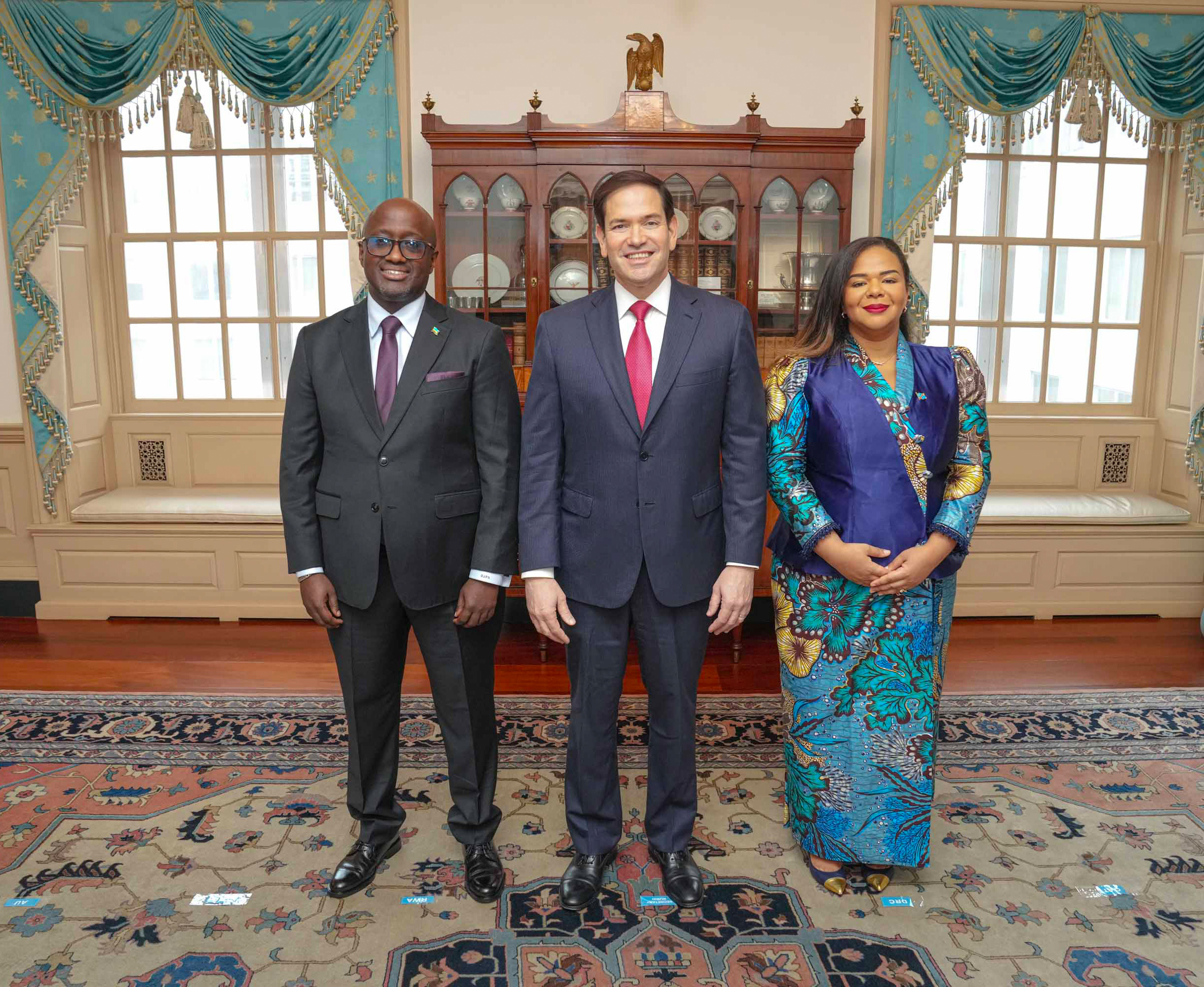
Foreign Ministers Wagner and Nduhungirehe at the U.S. Department of State in Washington, D.C., during the peace agreement signing ceremony hosted by Secretary Rubio on 27 June 2025.

On 27 June, the DRC and Rwanda signed a U.S.-mediated peace agreement in Washington, attended by Secretary of State Marco Rubio. Foreign Ministers Thérèse Wagner and Olivier Nduhungirehe formalized the accord, concluding months of diplomatic negotiations aimed at reducing tensions and conflict in eastern DRC. In response, Nangaa acknowledged the agreement but characterized it as a limited but useful step, asserting that it failed to address the conflict's deeper causes and dismissing the framing of the crisis as a mere Kinshasa–Kigali dispute. Nangaa reiterated M23's support for the Doha peace process as the only viable path to direct talks with the Congolese government. Nevertheless, M23 captured the Kaniola center on 28 June following renewed confrontations with Wazalendo forces. Broader clashes were concurrently reported across Walungu Territory, encompassing Mulamba, Muzinzi, Bwahungu, Kaniola, Mubone, and Cihambe. In Masisi Territory, M23 engaged Wazalendo in Bugabo, subsequently bolstering their defensive posture in Kasopo with additional personnel and ordnance. Rebel combatants were also sighted in Kashebere and Kibati, located in the Luberike groupement of Walikale Territory. Meanwhile, in Rutshuru Territory, M23 militants skirmished with VDP-aligned CMC forces in Birambizo village within the Bukombo groupement.

In the M23-occupied city of Goma, violent criminality persisted as a young videographer, Dieu Merci Black, was fatally shot by unidentified assailants in Birere, specifically on Kiboko Avenue within the Mikeno quarter. Two of his companions sustained injuries. In the Majengo quarter of Karisimbi commune, a female currency exchanger was also killed. On 29 June, in Walikale Territory, Wazalendo abducted two M23 commanders near the villages of Kirumburumbu and Muuli while they traversed the Ikobo groupement. The captives were subsequently transported to Buhimba, Wazalendo's operational headquarters. On 30 June, M23 insurgents launched a failed search operation in the adjacent forests and compelled local farmers to vacate their fields to facilitate the hunt. In Rutshuru Territory, M23 and CMC fighters clashed across Munguli (Kihondo groupement) and Kikuro (Tongo groupement) in Bwito Chiefdom, with heavy gunfire reported. At least six homes were burned in Karambi, and one wounded civilian was abducted from an MSF ambulance en route to Mweso. In Goma, Dr. John Mukebayi, a physician at Kirotshe Hospital, was lethally stabbed in his home by unidentified armed men. Near Minembwe in Fizi Territory, the Congolese Air Force (Force Aérienne Congolaise; FAC) intercepted and downed an unknown aircraft that had entered Congolese airspace. It was reportedly attempting to assist enemy groups and was targeted after being tracked by military radar as it neared a conflict area.

== July 2025 ==
=== 1–3 July ===
On 1 July, notwithstanding mounting international condemnation of its coercive operations against civilians, M23 executed its fourth such incursion in Sake, arresting at least 20 people, mostly young men, and wounding two others. Rebel forces encircled neighborhoods including Mosquée, Virunga, Bikali, and Ndolero, herding residents to a local stadium for identity verification. The detainees were accused of affiliations with FARDC, Wazalendo, and the FDLR, and were reportedly transferred to Goma. That same day in Walikale Territory, M23 attacked Wazalendo positions in Chanjikiro (Kisimba groupement), killing a 15-year-old girl and triggering new displacement. Recently returned villagers fled again, but Wazalendo repelled the assault and retained control of Chanjikiro. Meanwhile, in Iremya, CMC arrested two local leaders, Mutobe Sebasichi and Witonze Sebijumbo, accusing them of ties to M23, claims their families deny.

On 2 July, M23 executed a young male accused of theft in the village of Nyabiondo, Masisi Territory. He was first bound and subjected to mob violence before being summarily shot in the head at close range. The incident, recorded and disseminated online, was proclaimed by the group as "exemplary justice", provoking horror and dread among the local population. A contemporaneous UN report unveiled escalating internal dissension within the M23 hierarchy, attributed to contested leadership appointments and rumors surrounding the political resurgence of President Kabila. Rwanda was allegedly preparing to reinstate Laurent Nkunda to a high-ranking post within M23 to restore unity and public favor. The report also adds that figures such as Kabila, Katumbi, and John Numbi had maintained communications with Nangaa as well as officials in Kigali and Kampala. M23 had also succeeded in assimilating multiple local militias, including dissident Wazalendo factions, to bolster its territorial expansion across North and South Kivu.

On 3 July, M23 rebels burned the village of Buhimba in the Banamulema locality of Kisimba groupement, Walikale Territory. Rebel forces were ultimately repelled as far as Rusamambu and Bukumbirwa in the neighboring Ikobo groupement. However, during their retreat, M23 elements torched Buhimba, reducing homes, educational facilities, and houses of worship to ashes. In Goma, M23 arrested several men arriving by boat from Kalehe at Kituku market in Kyeshero and detained them in a fenced compound, with vendors among those taken. Other travelers on Lake Kivu were also intercepted and forcibly removed from their boats by M23. In Walikale Territory, M23 continued to entrench its positions, especially in Kisimba groupement, Wanianga sector. Reinforcements, including personnel and ammunition, were deployed to Mpety, in Banakindi locality, originating from the Kitshanga–Mweso–Kalembe axis. The group was planning an offensive on Pinga to capture the town and its airstrip, aiming to secure an additional supply route. The GOMA+ Weekly Report, compiled by the youth councils of Goma, Nyiragongo, and Rutshuru, noted that from 7 June to 3 July, there were 47 killings by gunfire, 75 sexual assaults, 14 kidnappings, and 66 lootings. The report also mentioned 63 house burnings, 25 weapon-related injuries, forced youth enlistment into M23, unlawful detentions, and unauthorized occupation of private property, mainly targeting political and military figures. On the diplomatic front, Boulos announced that a new phase of talks between the Congolese government and M23 would be held in Doha with Qatari mediation. The negotiations will focus on respecting territorial integrity, ending hostilities, disarming and reintegrating armed groups under certain conditions, and establishing a joint security coordination mechanism.

=== 4–7 July ===
On 4 July, M23 mobilized reinforcements to Kibati in the Luberike groupement of Walikale Territory, deploying personnel and munitions through several transport trucks in preparation for further territorial advances. Simultaneously, tensions erupted between the Nduma Defense of Congo-Rénové (NDC-R), led by Guidon Shimiray Mwissa, and the CMC faction under Bigabo's leadership. Both factions, once allied, engaged in mutual recriminations on social media, accusing each other of collaboration with M23 and of maligning other armed actors. This former alliance then deteriorated into open rivalry, with near-armed confrontations occurring twice in Pinga amid rising hostilities. On 5 July, a FARDC captain fatally shot Lungele Mbiso, communications coordinator for South Kivu's governor Jean Jacques Purusi. An enraged crowd later lynched the soldier on Tupendane Avenue after he discarded his weapon and attempted to flee. On 6 July, FARDC and Wazalendo forces clashed with M23 on Fungura Hill in Kisimba groupement, Walikale Territory, following a patrol encounter. Intense gunfire triggered the displacement of civilians in Katobi and Mera villages.

=== 8–10 July ===
On 8 July, unidentified armed men abducted Elias Kaombi, the village chief of Bussi within the M23-held Luberike groupement. In Masisi Territory, M23 forces launched an assault on positions held by Nyatura fighters affiliated with the ANCDH (Alliance des Nationalistes Congolais pour la Défense des Droits Humains), a Wazalendo-aligned militia led by Jean-Marie Bonané. The clashes occurred in the villages of Kalungu and Kinyana within the Bashali-Mokoto groupement. M23 temporarily dislodged the Nyatura forces from the nearby locality of Bupfuhi, which was reportedly set ablaze. However, ANCDH fighters mounted a counteroffensive later that evening, regaining control of their positions and forcing M23 to retreat. In Walikale Territory, militia led by self-proclaimed General Mudayonga withdrew from Mishipo (Makungurano, Waloa Loanda groupement), but vowed to return, claiming ownership of the land. He issued an ultimatum for villagers to vacate before his return, with locals, uncertain of the land's previous ownership, accusing him of terrorizing them and calling on authorities to increase security. On July 3, residents had already warned of Mudayonga's arrival with about 100 armed men, reportedly linked to the FDLR, aiming to forcibly displace them under the guise of land rights. Meanwhile, insecurity remains rampant in M23-held Goma, with four civilians wounded by gunfire and a motorbike taxi driver killed and robbed between 8–9 July, followed by another taxi driver shot dead in Kasika on 9 July, and gunmen killing a money changer's wife in Katoyi after failing to find him. That same day, peace negotiations between the Congolese government and M23 resumed, with representatives from both parties convening in Doha to continue diplomatic efforts. According to sources close to the Congolese delegation, the Rwandan government, through its M23 proxy, proposed exclusive control over North Kivu and South Kivu provinces for a period of eight years. The proposal included full administrative, political, and security authority. The Congolese government rejected the offer outright, denouncing it as an unacceptable bid for the "soft balkanization" of the country. Meanwhile, President Trump announced that a landmark peace agreement between the DRC and Rwanda would be signed by the end of July in Washington, with Presidents Félix Tshisekedi and Paul Kagame expected to formalize the accord. In Masisi Territory, clashes reignited between M23 and Wazalendo in the villages of Shoa and Burora, within the Buabo groupement, after patrol units from both sides encountered each other. In Kinshasa, General Christian Tshiwewe Songesha, former Chief of Staff of the FARDC, was arrested on suspicions of plotting against the head of state. His aide-de-camp, Colonel Adelart Mwiza, was also taken into custody.

On 10 July, Wazalendo launched an offensive to reclaim Nyamilima, but were decisively repulsed by M23. During the clash, one civilian was killed by a stray bullet. In Walikale Territory, M23 rebels originating from Ihula attacked Wazalendo positions in Mitembe/Katobo, located in the Banamulindwa locality of the Kisimba groupement. However, Wazalendo forces successfully repelled the assault and drove the M23 combatants back to Ihula. In Lubero Territory, M23 rebels vandalized the civil registry of Bamate Chiefdom in Mambasa-Mavuno (about 60 kilometers from Lubero), destroying all administrative records. Former Lubero provincial deputy Aisé Kanendu condemned the act as an attempt to destabilize traditional authority and erase local history. He warned that the destruction would impede future governance, even after peace is restored. In Kalehe Territory, M23 clashed with Wazalendo in Kasheke and Buzunga along the Kasheke–Lemera axis, where M23 attempted to seize control of National Road 2 (RN2), a key route linking Bukavu and Goma. Meanwhile, the Ugandan government reopened the Bunagana and Ishasa border posts with the DRC, linking Kisoro District to Rutshuru Territory, without informing Congolese authorities, prompting a diplomatic protest. The move raised concerns, as Bunagana remains under M23 control, and Uganda pledged to issue an official statement.

=== 11–15 July ===
On 11 July, a young volunteer night guard was shot and killed during a community patrol in Goma, where rising crime has forced local youth to take on security roles due to the absence of police. In Kabare Territory, between 11–12 July, M23 and RDF units killed five civilians in Karambi in retaliation for the alleged killing of one of their fighters. Among the victims were two teachers and others suspected of ties to Wazalendo militias. On 12 July, a joint M23–RDF coalition attacked FARDC positions in the localities of Kamatembe and Kalao (Kalehe Territory). On 14 July, fighting erupted in Shoa, Masisi Territory, as M23 rebels launched an attack against Wazalendo fighters from the Alliance des Patriotes pour un Congo Libre et Souverain (APCLS), led by Janvier Buingo Karairi, known as General Janvier. M23 reinforcements were seen arriving from Nyabiondo in Masisi Territory and Kashebere in Walikale Territory, but were ultimately repelled and forced to withdraw. In Walikale Territory, Wazalendo combatants from Banamulema (Kisimba groupement) attempted to dislodge M23 from the localities of Rusamambu and Bukumbirwa in the Ikobo groupement. However, after two days of intense fighting, Wazalendo forces were unable to regain control and withdrew, leaving both areas under M23 occupation. Meanwhile, in Kalehe Territory, joint M23–RDF forces launched attacks on FARDC positions in Kashihe, while additional assaults were carried out in Mwendabandu (Masisi Territory) and Batanga (Kabare Territory). On 15 July, General Joseph Mugisa Muleka was appointed as the new commander of the Sokola 1 operational sector in Greater North Kivu, based in Beni, replacing Major General Nyembo Abdallah, who was recently reassigned to Beni after serving in Ituri.

=== 16–19 July ===
On 16 July, President Kagame presided over a cabinet meeting at Urugwiro Village, where he ratified the peace agreement signed between Rwanda and the DRC on 27 June. Rwanda reiterated its commitment to the agreement's implementation and praised the ongoing negotiations in Doha, facilitated by Qatar and supported by the AU, as complementary to the Washington accord. That same day, Qatar's Minister of State for Interior Affairs, Abdulaziz bin Faisal bin Mohammed Al-Thani, held separate meetings in Doha with Rwanda's Interior Minister, Vincent Biruta, and the DRC's Deputy Prime Minister for Interior, Security, Decentralization, and Customary Affairs, Jacquemain Shabani Lukoo, with discussions centering on strengthening bilateral cooperation and advancing the DRC–M23 peace process. Meanwhile, negotiations continued between delegations led by Sumbu Sita Mambu, President Tshisekedi's High Representative, and Benjamin Bonimpa, head of the M23 delegation. On 17 July, Boulos met with Qatar's Minister of State for Foreign Affairs, Mohammed bin Abdulaziz bin Saleh Al Khulaifi, to review strategic relations between Doha and Washington and coordinate diplomatic engagement on various African matters, including the deteriorating security situation in eastern DRC. In Walungu Territory, M23 rebels were accused by provincial MP Béatrice Nanvano of killing over 19 civilians in Bukera village, including nine members of the same family, who were struck by a shell fired from rebel positions. Provincial MP Justin Rukingira Munguakonkwa confirmed the attack and called for an immediate response. That same day, the DRC formally summoned Uganda's ambassador to protest Kampala's unilateral decision to reopen border posts in territories under M23 control, without prior coordination. The protest, led by Foreign Minister Kayikwamba, followed directives issued during the 51st session of the Congolese Council of Ministers and reaffirmed Kinshasa's insistence on defending national sovereignty and territorial integrity.

On 19 July, the DRC and M23 signed a Declaration of Principles in Doha, witnessed by Qatar's Minister of State for Foreign Affairs. The agreement reaffirmed both parties' commitment to peaceful negotiation, respect for the DRC's sovereignty, and adherence to international legal frameworks. The accord established an immediate ceasefire, prohibiting all military aggression, acts of sabotage, hate speech, and territorial expansion. A joint mechanism was put in place to monitor compliance. The declaration includes confidence-building measures, such as a detainee release process with ICRC support, and calls for the dignified return of refugees. It also ties the restoration of state authority to resolving the root causes of the conflict. Implementation was scheduled to begin immediately, with full enforcement by 29 July and comprehensive peace talks slated for 8–18 August.

=== 20–24 July ===
On 21 July, fighting between M23 rebels and NDC continued for a third day in Kisimba groupement, Walikale Territory, with tensions particularly high in Nkobe and Banakindi villages. In Goma, a group of unidentified alleged Wazalendo fighters, reportedly from the Virunga National Park, attacked an M23-held position at the border between Mugunga neighborhood in Goma and the Rusayu groupement in Nyiragongo Territory. Several makeshift shelters used by the M23 were set on fire. The fighting was concentrated in Rusayu. On 22 July, M23 rebels launched attacks and seized control of several Wazalendo positions in southern Masisi Territory, targeting the villages of Kasenyi, Katobotobo, Karoba, Luke, and Bukumbiriri in the Nyamaboko 1st and Mufunyi-Kibabi groupements. Clashes also occurred in Muko, Bwito Chiefdom, under the control of the CMC, where at least eight civilians were killed and seven others wounded due to gunfire and explosives, especially in Bukombo, Kazuba, and Sisa. A faction of the Résistants Patriotes Congolais (PARECO), led by Kigingi, successfully repelled M23 rebels in the villages of Karoba, Bukumbiriri, and Katuunda, located in the Mufunyi-Kibabi groupement. Meanwhile, in Goma, M23 authorities imposed new school report cards for the 2024–2025 academic year, mandating that all public and private schools purchase them for 1,000 Congolese francs per unit, with payments made to CADECO based on student enrollment. This decision raised concerns over the administrative legitimacy and national recognition of these report cards, particularly as many schools had already issued official ones from the Congolese government.

On 23 July, heavy and light weapons fire was reported in Masisi Territory, especially in the villages of Katobotobo and Luke in the Nyamaboko 1st groupement, Osso sector. A faction of the PARECO, led by Mutayomba, was engaged in combat with M23 rebels. On 24 July, the DRC, Rwanda, and the UNHCR signed a tripartite agreement in Addis Ababa concerning the voluntary repatriation of refugees. The agreement followed two days of expert-level discussions and a high-level ministerial meeting. DRC Minister of the Interior, Security, Decentralization, and Customary Affairs Jacquemain Shabani Lukoo and Rwandan Ambassador General Charles Karamba represented their respective countries. The parties committed to ensuring the safe and dignified return of refugees, in accordance with international law and UNHCR guidelines. On the same day, M23 and Wazalendo clashed across several areas in Bwito Chiefdom, disrupting the harvest and putting farmers at risk of abduction or death.

=== 25–30 July ===
On 25 July, M23 rebels launched assaults on Wazalendo positions located on the Changara and Showa hills in the Osso sector. Although the rebels were pushed back as far as Bukombo, their advance intensified insecurity in the region. In Rutshuru Territory, M23 declared parts of the Binza groupement an operational zone amid their campaign to target FDLR fighters and local militias. As a result, thousands of civilians were forced to flee their homes. This mass displacement took place alongside disturbing reports of dozens of farmers being killed or disappearing, particularly along the Kiseguro–Nyamilima axis near Virunga National Park in Bwisha Chiefdom. These acts have been attributed to M23 fighters, who routinely justify such violence by alleging the victims were collaborators with the FDLR or other local armed groups. Meanwhile, in Masisi Territory, M23 captured Mulema following clashes with Wazalendo forces. Wazalendo launched offensives to retake Luke and Katobotobo, but these efforts were unsuccessful. Despite reinforcements arriving from Kasopo, M23 successfully repelled the counterattacks and retained control of Mulema. M23 accused Kinshasa of undermining the agreement and warned of a potential collapse of the peace process. In Goma, M23 executive secretary Benjamin Mbonimpa insisted that any future accord must redefine state authority nationwide, not just in rebel-held areas, with M23 playing a central role. He suggested that the current government would not be part of the new order and announced plans to propose major reforms, including federalism. Mbonimpa also reiterated that the release of over 700 detainees allegedly affiliated with M23, currently held by Kinshasa, was a non-negotiable precondition for continued participation in the Doha dialogue. He described this step as an essential confidence-building measure outlined in the Declaration of Principles. According to the timeline stipulated in the declaration, the implementation phase must begin by 29 July, followed by direct peace negotiations commencing on 8 August, with the goal of finalizing a comprehensive peace accord involving Rwanda by 17 August.

On 26 July, after bolstering their ranks, M23 forces expelled Janvier Karairi's APCLS fighters from the strategic locality of Showa, comprising the villages of Showa, Muhondo, and Changara, forcing their retreat to Ngesha and Burora. That same day, M23 launched additional assaults on Wazalendo positions in the villages of Kazinga and Kibanda, also located in the Osso sector. Simultaneously, Nangaa announced that M23 would not return to the Doha peace talks with the Congolese government unless the release of over 700 detained members is prioritized. Nangaa emphasized that this demand aligns with the confidence-building measures stipulated in the Doha Declaration of Principles. The Congolese government had addressed this on 21 July, stating that the issue of prisoner release would be included in the forthcoming peace agreement. On July 27, M23 rebels from Kalembe/Kalonge attacked Wazalendo positions in Kalinga village in the Banamulema locality in the Kisimba groupement of Walikale Territory before being pushed back by Wazalendo. On July 28, M23 expanded its control to Ngululu and Ndete in Nyamaboko, Masisi Territory, after fierce clashes with Wazalendo, who had retreated there following the fall of Mulema. On July 29, MSF raised alarm over the dramatic rise in sexual violence in North Kivu province, reporting that nearly 40,000 victims received medical care in 2024, with similarly high numbers continuing in 2025, with the situation worsened since the M23 took control of Goma. Women and girls had been especially vulnerable, particularly after the dismantling of displacement camps that had sheltered over 650,000 people. That same 29 July, M23 rebels strengthened their presence in Kateku village, in the Ikobo groupement of Walikale Territory, with reinforcements of men and ammunition from Buleusa. These armed men positioned themselves throughout the area for a planned attack on Pinga. Several sources also report other reinforcements heading to Rusamambu and Bukumbirwa for the same purpose.

=== 31 July–1 August ===
On 31 July, M23 attempted to advance toward Pinga from Buhimba and Chanjikiro (in the banana area of Kisimba groupement), but were once again repelled by Wazalendo forces. In Walikale Territory, several secondary school graduates in Buleusa were forcibly conscripted by M23 to transport ammunition shortly after completing their national exams. The students, still clad in their school uniforms, were compelled to carry arms from Buleusa to Rusamambu, despite reports that M23 had access to trucks. That same day in Washington, D.C., representatives of the DRC and Rwanda convened with observers from the US, Qatar, Togo (serving as AU facilitator), and the African Union Commission for the inaugural session of the Joint Monitoring Committee tasked with overseeing the Washington Peace Agreement's implementation. Within the accord's 30-day framework, the committee designated leadership roles, adopted procedural protocols, reviewed progress, and prepared for the first session of the Joint Security Coordination Mechanism. The AU, Qatar, and the US reaffirmed their commitment to integrating the accord's provisions within broader regional peace initiatives. On 1 August, a joint EAC–SADC regional summit in Nairobi reviewed DRC security situation, aligned regional peace efforts, and coordinated efforts to protect its sovereignty and territorial integrity. The summit brought together leaders from the EAC, SADC, the AU, peace facilitators, and Togolese Foreign Minister Robert Dussey, the designated mediator in the DRC–Rwanda conflict. Ruto stated the initiative aims to complement foreign efforts with a coordinated, Africa-led framework. Key measures included merging EAC, SADC, and AU peace structures under AU leadership, creating a unified secretariat, and scheduling a virtual follow-up within a week. The summit also called for urgent resource mobilization for humanitarian aid and alignment of peace initiatives under this African-led process. With U.S. facilitation, the DRC and Rwanda initialed the Principles of the Regional Economic Integration Framework, covering cooperation in energy, infrastructure, mining, national park management and tourism, and public health. In Beni, human rights organizations rejected the M23's proposal for a federalist system in the DRC, denouncing it as "dangerous and unacceptable" and viewing it as a veiled attempt to fracture the nation and potentially annex parts of its territory to Rwanda. They also condemned recent remarks by Erasto Bahati Musanga, the M23-appointed governor of North Kivu, who urged youth enlistment into the rebel forces while dismissing the Doha peace talks as futile.

== August 2025 ==
=== 2–6 August ===
On 3 August, Wazalendo fighters affiliated with the Uhuru and MAC factions engaged in combat with M23 rebels in Kibanda, located in the Osso sector between Kasopo and Buhimba. By 4 August, both parties had withdrawn to their original positions, leaving Kibanda entirely deserted. That same day, APCLS combatants loyal to Janvier Karairi launched assaults on multiple M23 positions in Kalembe/Kalonge, a strategic area straddling the border between Walikale and Masisi Territories. On 5 August, Bukavu journalist Fiston Wilondja Mazambi died from injuries after being tortured; his body, bloodied and bound with a rope, was found in the street. Local sources say he was abducted near his Nguba home, and press group Journaliste en danger (JED) urged M23 leaders to clarify the circumstances, calling it an unusual case of insecurity in rebel-held areas. On 6 August, the OHCHR reported that M23, with RDF support, killed at least 319 civilians between 9 and 21 July in North Kivu, including 48 women and 19 children, mostly farmers camping in their fields. UN rights chief Volker Türk condemned the massacre, the deadliest since M23's resurgence in 2022, calling it a "surge of deadly violence" despite the recently signed Doha ceasefire. On the same day, M23 conducted its sixth cordon-and-search operation in Mabanga Sud, a neighborhood in Goma's Karisimbi commune, detaining several residents, primarily young men, on suspicion of ties to the FARDC, Wazalendo, or the FDLR. Residents were forced to gather at Stade de l'Unité for identity checks, and witnesses reported that two youths were shot while attempting to flee.

=== 7–8 August ===
On 7 August, the anticipated 8 August launch of direct peace talks in Doha between the Congolese government and the M23 rebellion failed to materialize, as neither delegation had traveled to Qatar. Citing OHCHR findings, the Congolese government accused M23 of flagrantly violating the Doha commitments and urged peace mediators and facilitators to note the gap between its rhetoric and actions. Reaffirming its commitment to genuine dialogue, Kinshasa called for the immediate activation of the UNHRC's investigative commission under Resolution A/HRC/RES/S-37/1 to identify and prosecute those responsible for the current aggression. Spokesperson Patrick Muyaya stressed that "no peace process can succeed in silence in the face of horror" and that protecting human life is non-negotiable. Meanwhile, the South Kivu Civil Society Coordination Office, along with partner organizations, urged the DGM to lift its ban on M23-issued travel documents, such as tenant lieu papers and CEPGL permits, arguing it mainly harms civilians in rebel-held areas. They cited cases of Congolese travelers stopped abroad for carrying such papers and stressed that official passports are costly and hard to obtain, while the DGM insists that only documents from legitimate DRC authorities are valid for entry or exit. Also on 7 August, Walungu Territory came under a violent assault involving armed drones operated by M23, with strikes targeting Kaniola center and the Ntula mining site, killing at least ten civilians and wounding many others. The attack followed a major M23 offensive launched earlier that day against Wazalendo positions, with intense clashes in Cagala, Murali, Mwirama, and Nzibira forcing hundreds of families to flee toward Budodo, Cisaza, and Mugaba. Provincial deputy Béatrice Nanvano condemned the assault as a flagrant breach of the principles of the agreement and called for firm sanctions and strengthened civilian protection. In Bunia, tensions persisted following renewed gunfire as security forces apprehended eight suspected militiamen and seized a crate of ammunition. Three of those detained, reportedly members of the Convention for the Popular Revolution (Convention pour la Révolution Populaire; CRP), a militia linked to Thomas Lubanga, were arrested in Bakongolo neighborhood (quartier), while the remaining five, captured in a hotel, were believed to have ties to M23.

On 7–8 August, the DRC and Rwanda, joined by observers from the US, Qatar, the AU mediator's office, and the AU Commission, held the first meeting of the Joint Security Coordination Mechanism in Addis Ababa. Tasked with implementing the plan to neutralize the FDLR, withdraw forces, and lift Rwanda's defensive measures under the 27 June Washington accord, the mechanism also aims to facilitate intelligence sharing. The parties adopted terms of reference and began discussing the accord's implementation. On 8 August, Wazalendo of the APCLS attacked the M23 rebel position in Bueni, a village near Kashebere in the Luberike groupement of Walikale Territory. In the Ikobo groupement, M23 forced residents of Buleusa and Rusamambu into labor, regardless of age or condition. Young men were made to haul firewood weekly, while women were forced to fetch water daily under threat of torture. Many fled, while those who stayed endured abusive conditions. In Bironga near Mpety, Banakindi locality, Kisimba groupement, three unidentified men were found shot dead in M23-controlled territory under unclear circumstances. In Rutshuru Territory, in the Mutanda groupement of Bwito Chiefdom, M23 rebels ordered thousands of residents to vacate their villages within five days, declaring the area an "operational zone". Locals were directed to relocate to Kibizi, Kikuku, Nyanzale, or Bwalanda, areas where they have no means of survival. Mutanda, a key agricultural hub, faces disruptions as this forced displacement hampers farming activities on the surrounding strategic hills. In the Binza groupement, eight bodies were interred following lethal attacks in the Kihito fields and Nyamilima. Seven victims, five woodcutters and two farmers from the same family, were shot or stabbed, reportedly targeted during an M23 operation against suspected FDLR members. In Masisi Territory, M23 and Wazalendo clashed in Kibanda, Nyamaboko 1st groupement; following the fighting, M23 attempted to overrun Wazalendo positions and push toward Buhimba but were forced back to the border between the Waloa Yungu and Luberike groupements.

=== 9–12 August ===
On 9 August, M23 units appeared in Mulamba groupement, Ngweshe Chiefdom, Walungu Territory, after fighting with Wazalendo, who retreated to nearby villages including Nzibira, Mirhumba, and Luntukulu. Clashes persisted in Kaniola groupement, under M23 occupation since 28 June, with casualties reported in the Ntula mining zone and Muhambwe, though figures remain unconfirmed. The Walungu Territory students' association condemned the deaths, while FARDC spokesperson Reagan Mbuyi Kalonji denied that local villages were under M23 control, calling such claims "deceptive propaganda" designed to erode public trust and sow discord between frontline troops and their command. In Walikale Territory, M23 executed six men in the Kisimba groupement, accusing them of collaborating with the Volontaires pour la Défense de la Patrie (VDP) and providing intelligence to Wazalendo. Fearing further reprisals, many residents fled the area. On 10 August, M23 and Wazalendo engaged in renewed combat in Mulamba groupement. Earlier, South Kivu provincial spokesperson Didier Kabi confirmed that FARDC and Wazalendo forces had withdrawn from Mulamba and Kaniola groupements to avoid a large-scale massacre, leaving several areas, including Kaniola, Muzinzi, Ciruko, and parts of Mulamba, under M23 control. That same day in Nyamilima, Binza groupement, the Kiheka quartier chief was found shot dead in his home after unidentified gunmen broke in overnight, an incident that deepened residents' fears in the M23-held area. On 11 August, residents of Katobo, Banamulindwa locality, Kisimba groupement, Walikale Territory, were forcibly displaced by M23, who ordered them to relocate to Ihula, Kalembe, and Kikuku, all rebel-held areas. Traditional authorities in Kisimba said the rebels accused villagers of passing information to Wazalendo. Other sources suggested the displacement was intended to clear the area for M23 military operations, as Kisimba has become a hotspot for armed confrontations. In Waloa Yungu groupement, M23 forces arriving from Kashebere established a new military position on Mount Machumbi, near Ngenge, with the declared aim of attacking Ngenge, Buhimba, and Kimua, settlements hosting large numbers of displaced persons from Masisi Territory. This move followed recent clashes in the area between M23 and Wazalendo from the UHURU-MAC coalition, during which security sources reported at least 18 rebel fatalities.

Diplomatic initiatives to resolve the eastern DRC conflict have yielded little progress, with FARDC and M23 trading accusations of violating the Doha ceasefire. On 12 August, FARDC accused the M23 coalition of adopting a "warlike" attitude, mounting repeated assaults on army positions in North and South Kivu, and perpetrating targeted massacres of mostly Hutu civilians in North Kivu. The army condemned these acts as deliberate violations of the Washington Accord and the Doha Declaration of Principles, reaffirming its commitment to peace while reserving the right to respond to provocations. M23, for its part, accused FARDC of deploying troops and equipment to locations including Nzimbira, Mwenga, Bunyakiri, Kibuwa, Pinga, and Uvira in breach of the ceasefire, citing the arrival in Uvira on 10 August of two military vessels carrying over 1,100 fighters as evidence of deliberate escalation. The rebels alleged these deployments have precipitated attacks on densely populated areas, civilian casualties, and mass displacement. That same day, Radio Okapi reported that M23 withdrew from Katana, Kabare Territory, and Bukavu, redeploying with heavy weaponry toward the Walungu Territory and Uvira axes to reinforce their military presence. Fierce fighting continued in Walungu Territory, with FARDC and Wazalendo confronting M23 forces. On the Katana front, Wazalendo fighters from the MDLC group seized control of the area and neighboring villages. FARDC and Wazalendo retain much of the Ruzizi Plain beyond Uvira, while M23 maintains positions along the Nyangezi–Kamanyola axis and in parts of the Ruzizi Plain Chiefdom.

=== 13–18 August ===
On 13 August, Actualite.cd reported that Colonel Charles Sematama, leader of the Twirwaneho militia and a U.S.-sanctioned deserter, said Twirwaneho and M23 had collaborated long before the AFC's creation, initially planning to announce their membership but later keeping it secret to avoid attracting the attention of their "enemy". That same day, M23 attacked VDP positions in Buhimba, Kisimba groupement, Walikale Territory, aiming to expand their control but were driven back toward Ihula and Minjenje. Local leaders denounced the assault as a calculated violation of the Doha Declaration. On 14 August, M23 reinforced positions in Kalembe and Kalonge on the Walikale–Masisi border, transporting men and heavy weaponry from Kitshanga and Mweso. The motive for the buildup remains unclear, but after consolidating in Kalonge and Kalembe, the rebels strengthened their footholds in Mpety and Ihula, Kisimba groupement, as well as in Rusamambu and Bukumbirwa, Ikobo groupement, where trucks from Buleusa delivered troops and ammunition. Local sources indicated the movements aimed to facilitate an eventual push toward Pinga. On 15 August, as part of a broader reshuffle in Kenya's foreign service, President William Ruto nominated a senior diplomatic envoy by appointing a consul general to Goma, a city under M23 control. The Congolese Ministry of Foreign Affairs, Thérèse Kayikwamba, criticized the appointment on 16 August, asserting that it had not been consulted and that such a decision requires prior bilateral approval under international law. The ministry deemed the move "particularly inappropriate", citing ongoing human rights abuses in areas under M23 control. On 17 August, M23 launched an offensive against Wazalendo fighters affiliated with the MAC in Kaliki, Waloa Yungu groupement (Walikale Territory), to broaden their territorial gains. They were repelled and forced to fall back to Kibati in the Luberike area. That same day, the Congolese government reaffirmed its commitment to the Doha peace process and emphasized the importance of respecting national sovereignty. In a parallel statement, M23 declared that it would only participate in future dialogue if the Congolese government adhered to provisions outlined in the Qatari-brokered Declaration of Principles, presumably referring to the release of prisoners. On 18 August, M23 confirmed its intention to dispatch a delegation to Doha, reversing its earlier stance linked to the government's failure to implement key confidence-building measures. Rebel leader Bertrand Bisimwa stated that the delegation would prioritize enforcing the ceasefire and advocating for the release of detainees. On the same day, Kenya's Ministry of Foreign Affairs issued a statement clarifying the appointment of its envoy to Goma and affirmed its recognition of the DRC's sovereign right to approve diplomatic postings. In Walikale Territory, M23 fighters returning from Kibati attempted once more to seize Kaliki but encountered resistance from Wazalendo forces and were again driven back.

=== 19–20 August ===
On 19 August, M23 conducted an operation in Goma's Kyeshero neighborhood, detaining numerous individuals (primarily young men) under the pretext of identity verification. It marked the second such operation in Goma in August, the first having occurred on 6 August in Mabanga-Sud. That same day in Kinshasa, Belgian Deputy Prime Minister and Foreign Minister Maxime Prévot met National Assembly President Vital Kamerhe at the Palais du Peuple, criticizing Europe's neglect of the eastern DRC's tragedy and stressing that Europe must not remain silent while Washington and Doha mediate. He stated that his visit aimed to explore tangible ways Belgium could bolster peace efforts. Meanwhile, FARDC condemned recent M23 offensives in North and South Kivu as a "flagrant violation" of the Washington and Doha accords, citing, among other incidents, the 11 August attack on its Musenda naval base (Lubero Territory). The army urged US and Qatari mediators to acknowledge these provocations and vowed to take all necessary measures to defend civilians and restore stability.

On 20 August, Human Rights Watch reported that M23 summarily executed more than 140 civilians (predominantly Hutu, with some Nande) across at least 14 villages in July 2025. The atrocities were attributed to the 1st Battalion of the 1st Brigade under Colonel Samuel Mushagara and Brigadier General Baudoin Ngaruye, both under UN sanctions for prior abuses. Witnesses and UN sources confirmed the participation of Rwandan troops, identified by uniforms and accents. Amnesty International likewise documented serious violations by all parties, including extrajudicial killings, gang rapes, hospital assaults, abductions, torture, and enforced disappearances targeting civil society. Sexual violence was pervasive: of 14 survivors interviewed, eight were raped by M23 fighters, five by Wazalendo, and one by FARDC, with some attacks taking place inside M23 bases in Goma and Bukavu.

=== 21–24 August ===
On 21 August, Journaliste en Danger (JED) condemned threats by M23 to shut down media outlets in Bukavu, denouncing it as part of a broader campaign to silence independent journalism. During a meeting with local press managers, M23 representative Laurence Kamyuka instructed outlets not to publish content favorable to the government, FARDC, or Wazalendo, warning of closures for noncompliance. JED also reported the imposition of new financial requirements: $250 annually for a license, $200 for authorization, and between $200–400 for broadcasting frequencies, which many outlets cannot afford. These restrictions contradicted M23's July pledge to ease media taxation, instead revealing a tightening of information control in rebel-held areas. On 22 August, the UNSC convened an emergency session at the request of the US, in light of intensifying violence in eastern Congo. UN Assistant Secretary-General for Africa Martha Ama Akyaa Pobee urged the parties to enforce an effective ceasefire, criticizing both sides for their failure to implement Resolution 2773. While she welcomed the establishment of a joint monitoring committee, the security coordination mechanism, and a regional economic framework between the DRC and Rwanda, she emphasized that these structures cannot substitute for urgent action to halt hostilities. Congolese envoy Zénon Mukongo Ngay called for stronger sanctions against Rwanda and M23 commanders, warning that inaction would condone impunity and undermine Resolution 2773. The DRC also requested UN support for the creation of an international commission of inquiry into war crimes. Meanwhile, in Walungu Territory, FARDC's 3309th Infantry Regiment intercepted and destroyed an M23 kamikaze drone targeting a strategic position in Nzibira, describing the incident as part of an emerging pattern of rebel defiance of peace accords and vowing to maintain vigilance in the defense of national sovereignty. On 24 August, clashes between M23 and Wazalendo in Kalonge and Kalembe, on the Masisi–Walikale border, left three civilians dead and seven injured.

=== 25–31 August ===
On 25 August, 533 Rwandan nationals (predominantly Hutu refugees) were repatriated from the DRC via Rubavu, as part of a larger repatriation effort totaling over 4,000 since May 2025. However, reports indicate that M23 has coerced some refugees by obstructing their return to homes in the DRC following security roundups. In Masisi Territory, M23 attacked APCLS positions in Biholo and Muhemba but were repelled, retreating toward Kasopo. On 27 August, Wazalendo recaptured Rugezi village in Fizi Territory after nearly 24 hours of clashes with a militia coalition, including Twirwaheno, Ngumino, and Android Red, aligned with M23. Wazalendo, reportedly led by Commander Ngoma Nzito, ultimately regained control. In Mwenga Territory, hostilities erupted in Namalamala village (Kalemba locality, Basimukindji 2 groupement, Itombwe sector) between Mupekenya-led Wazalendo forces and M23, though both sides remained entrenched at the time. In Walikale Territory, M23 bolstered its presence with six trucks of fighters and ammunition arriving in Kashebere from Nyabiondo, distributed between Kashebere and Kibati, fueling local unease in the Luberike groupement. Security sources also noted troop movements from Kitshanga to Ihula in the Kisimba groupement during the preceding week. M23 and Wazalendo fighters (specifically from the Uhuru-MAC subgroup) engaged in clashes in Kibanda, Masisi Territory, after an M23 patrol from Kasopo encountered Wazalendo fighters from Buhimba, which then triggered brief gunfire that alarmed residents of Kibanda and Waloa Yungu. On 28 August, M23 reinforced positions in the Kisimba groupement, moving fighters and ammunition from Kalembe and Kitshanga to Mpety. Some units advanced toward Katobi, others remained, before dispersing into the bush with uncertain objectives, potentially preparing to seize Pinga. In Mwenga Territory, M23 and Wazalendo clashed in Muhuzi village. The fighting erupted early after M23 elements emerged from the Matundu forest (where they had retreated following previous confrontations near Lubambe) and advanced toward the Kyaruhumba mining area. Rebels later appeared near Mugutu, close to Muhuzi, and reportedly attempted to push toward Kahololo and Minembwe. The conflict spread to Kanyatende Mugutu in the Kigogo groupement of Luindi Chiefdom. Civil society actors reported a marked escalation, with Wazalendo receiving support from the FNDB, while M23 was bolstered by Burundian FNL rebels under Aloys Nzabampema, with the Matundu forest becoming a focal front in this expanding conflict.

On 29 August, M23 rebels from Bukumbirwa (in the Ikobo groupement) advanced to Birombi in Kisimba groupement, where they held a public meeting ordering residents to evacuate ahead of planned military operations. Civilians were instructed to move to Rusamambu and Bukumbirwa, already under rebel control. That same day, the Congolese government initiated a resolution nullifying all judicial acts and decisions issued by M23 authorities, declaring them unconstitutional and void. The move followed M23's announcement of plans to establish its own judicial commission in occupied areas. Justice Minister Guillaume Ngefa Atondoko underscored that only the Congolese state possesses the constitutional authority to constitute courts. Meanwhile, clashes erupted between M23 and Wazalendo near Don Bosco in Munigi groupement (Bukumu Chiefdom), close to Goma. Residents in Mabanga-Sud, Mabanga-Nord, and Majengo reported intense gunfire and explosions. Calm returned on 30 August, though fear persisted. Accounts differed on whether Wazalendo attempted to expel M23 from Goma or if rebels clashed with bandits. Casualties remained uncertain: bodies in military attire were observed, and a medical source confirmed at least one fatality and one injury. This marked the second Wazalendo attack in Goma and Nyiragongo since April. On 31 August, Wazalendo attempted to retake Kibati but were repelled, retreating to Miba, three kilometers west. Local sources reported they temporarily captured one of three rebel positions before withdrawing. The toll remains unknown, though reports suggest Wazalendo were regrouping for a renewed offensive.

== September 2025 ==
=== 1–7 September ===
On 1 September, M23 mounted an assault on Wazalendo positions in Kubi (Kisimba groupement, Walikale Territory), targeting Kilau in Banakindi locality. Wazalendo repelled the offensive, pushing the rebels back to Iteya and Mpety while maintaining control of the high ground above Kubi. On 2 September, Uvira was paralyzed by Wazalendo-led protests against the 1 September appointment of Brigadier General Olivier Gasita Mukunda as deputy commander of the 33rd Military Region. Demonstrators accused him of collusion with Rwanda and M23, which then sparked widespread unrest. On 4 September, HRW released a geospatial study showing a surge in burials at Kigali's Kanombe military cemetery tied to Rwanda's involvement in the M23 rebellion in eastern DRC. Satellite images revealed that average weekly graves rose from 1.7 (2017–2021) to 6 (after M23's 2022 return), and peaked at 22 per week during heavy fighting for Goma between December 2024 and April 2025. HRW counted 1,171 new burials since 2022, including 460 in the first seven months of 2025, concentrated in newly cleared southern cemetery zones near barracks and a military hospital. The timing strongly suggested heavy RDF casualties, contradicting Rwanda's claims of minimal casualties. HRW's findings align with earlier media reports of cemetery expansion and argue that Rwanda's role in the offensive makes it an "occupying power" under international law, legally accountable for abuses committed by M23.

On 5 September, the OHCHR released its Fact-Finding Mission report on North and South Kivu, established by the UNHRC under Resolution A/HRC/RES/S-37/1 of 7 February 2025. It concluded that all parties, M23, FARDC, and Wazalendo, committed grave violations of international humanitarian law, some amounting to war crimes and crimes against humanity. M23 was found responsible for systematic campaigns of repression, including executions, torture, arbitrary detention, disappearances, forced recruitment, and widespread sexual violence. The report cited recurring patterns of organized abuses, concluding that crimes against humanity such as murder, rape, sexual slavery, and forced displacement were committed. FARDC and Wazalendo were also implicated in killings, sexual violence, looting, and child recruitment, with evidence suggesting coordinated rather than isolated acts. On 7 September, M23 recaptured Shoa after clashes with Wazalendo fighters from Janvier Buingo Karairi's APCLS faction, as well as other villages, including Mafuo, Biholo, Bwambaliro, Busoro, Kinyeere, Burora, and Ngesha, while Wazalendo forces withdrew toward Kazinga and Mahanga on the Masisi–Walikale border. That same day, the Congolese government issued a formal statement acknowledging the Fact-Finding Mission report as confirmation that the crisis constitutes an international armed conflict due to the presence of Rwandan troops on its territory. The government rejected any "inappropriate comparison" between FARDC and armed groups, insisting the army remains bound by the Constitution and international law under a "zero-tolerance" policy for violations. The government characterized it as misleading to draw symmetry between a sovereign state's army and what it described as a "subversive proxy force of a neighboring state pursuing a strategy of terror, mass atrocities, and illegal resource exploitation". It also denied any collaboration with the FDLR, stressing that strict presidential directives prohibit collusion and that disciplinary and judicial measures are systematically enforced against offenders.

=== 8–14 September ===
Between 8–9 September, clashes between M23 and Wazalendo in Bashali Chiefdom, killed six civilians and injured two, with three deaths in Katobo and three in Malemo. Fighting spread through Mpati, Katobo, Malemo, and Bibwe, which M23 seized on 9 September. That same day, security services intercepted seven people in Wanie-Rukula, 60 kilometers from Kisangani on the Lubutu axis; four were identified as M23 members, including a former CNDP fighter, and three as suspected collaborators. Arrests at the Maiko bridge accentuated the corridor's strategic value linking Tshopo Province to Walikale Territory via Maniema Province, though military officials declined to confirm whether it signaled a rebel advance toward Kisangani, headquarters of the 3rd Defense Zone. On 10 September, M23 clashed with a coalition of Wazalendo factions, including MAC, Uhuru, and APCLS, in Kasopo. The coalition succeeded in dislodging M23 from two of the four positions established since April. Clashes in Kibati, Bukumu Chiefdom, left two Wazalendo and nine M23 dead. In Walikale Territory, APCLS forces loyal to Janvier Buingo Karairi ambushed M23 near Minjenje in Kisimba, reportedly killing several rebels. Additional reports from Kalembe indicated trucks transporting wounded fighters to Mwesso for treatment.

On 12 September 2025, the US welcomed the signing of a prisoner exchange mechanism between the Congolese government and M23, with Boulos praising it as "a decisive step toward de-escalation and the promotion of peace in eastern DRC". Under this framework, the ICRC would serve as a neutral intermediary responsible for the identification, verification, and secure release of detainees from both sides. On 13 September, reinforced M23 units launched an offensive on Wazalendo positions in Kasopo, recapturing one of two previously lost strongholds. The battle left at least two Wazalendo fighters seriously wounded and evacuated to a local health center. On 14 September, M23 maintained control over three of the four strategic positions around Kasopo, leaving Wazalendo with only one. That same day, two decomposed bodies were found in Bussi (Luberike groupement, Walikale Territory), the site of recent clashes, believed to be fallen Wazalendo.

=== 15–27 September ===
On 15 September, the ICRC received a signed detainee-release mechanism between the DRC and M23 in Doha, mediated by Qatari officials after months of Doha talks. Previously, between 30 April and 15 May, the ICRC oversaw the transfer of over 1,300 disarmed Congolese personnel and their families from Goma to Kinshasa. That same 15 September, M23 captured Ndurumo and Kinyaongo villages in Bashali-Mokoto groupement (Bashali Chiefdom) and Bapfuna groupement (Osso-Banyungu sector) after clashes with Wazalendo, while between 15–16 September, FARDC regained control of Katobi and Luola villages in the Kisimba groupement. On 16 September, M23 executed a motorcycle taxi driver in Kashebere (Luberike groupement) after detaining him at a roadblock. On 17 September, Actualite.cd reported that M23 launched Radio Télévision Communautaire de Kipese (RTCK) on 92.0 MHz the previous week, broadcasting from Kipese's heights (Lubero Territory). On 17–18 September, the Joint Security Coordination Mechanism (JSCM) met in Washington, with delegations from the DRC, Rwanda, the US, Togo, Qatar, and the AU. They endorsed an "operational order" to launch joint operations against the FDLR starting 1 October, alongside phased Rwandan troop withdrawals (21–31 October), with full compliance by year's end. Disputes remained: Rwanda estimated 2,000–3,000 FDLR fighters versus DRC's 1,500; DRC also demanded that "any neutralization plan must address Rwanda and M23", which Rwanda rejected. On 18 September, FARDC positions came under attack in multiple locations: Ndete and Kazinga (Nyamaboko 1 groupement, Osso sector, Masisi Territory); Chamombo and Katale (Ziralo groupement, Buhavu Chiefdom, Kalehe Territory); and Muhondo (Banyungu groupement). The FARDC accused M23 and RDF of repeated ceasefire violations against the Washington Agreement and Doha Principles, warning it would no longer tolerate such provocations and reserved the right to respond "with firmness and determination". On 19 September, FARDC shelled M23 rebel positions in the area around Bibwe as rebels regrouped from Kitshanga and Kalembe in Minjenje, Bibwe, Malemo, and Mpety, though the purpose of the buildup remained unclear. That same day, M23 perpetrated a massacre in Chanjikiro and Buhimba villages (Kisimba groupement, Walikale Territory), killing an estimated 25–37 civilians.

On 20 September, M23 rebels arrested 41 civilians who had been hiding in the forests of Chanjikiro and Buhimba, where villagers had fled to escape ongoing armed violence, and transferred them to their camp in Buleusa, a stronghold in the Ikobo groupement. The administrative secretary of the Kisimba groupement, Lavie Changwi, voiced concern for their safety, noting the motives remain unclear. Meanwhile, the Congolese Air Force shelled M23 positions on Nkuba hill in Kisimba groupement (Walikale Territory) and Chamungu hill in Bashali-Mokoto groupement after a rebel attack on Wazalendo in Katobi. Actualite.cd noted that the strikes enabled Wazalendo to repel M23 back to Mpety. On 21 September, M23 captured Nzibira, a strategic town straddling Mwenga and Shabunda Territories near Walungu Territory, situated on routes to Kigulube, Evari, and Luntukulu, and noted for its "3T" mineral deposits. The takeover coincided with letters from several armed groups to President Tshisekedi, demanding the transfer of the 3306th regiment commander in Mwenga and Shabunda Territories. On 24 September, FARDC's 3rd Defense Zone presented 30 M23 combatants who had surrendered, along with 15 others captured on frontlines in North and South Kivu after fleeing due to mistreatment in M23 training camps at Rumangabo (North Kivu), Nyangezi (South Kivu), and at forward positions. Among them were two minors. On 25 September, M23 rebels carried out a large-scale sweep operation (bouclage) in Kasika and Mabanga-Sud (Karisimbi commune, Goma), detaining scores of civilians, mainly youths and some religious leaders accused of pro-government ties. That same day, Wazalendo positions were simultaneously struck in the Kaniola groupement and Karisimbi. On 27 September, three people were killed in Uvira Territory during a confrontation between the FARDC and members of the Wazalendo faction known as the Lunyuki group. The cause remains unclear. The Lunyuki camp was burned, two civilians died from stray bullets, one FARDC soldier was killed, and one Lunyuki fighter was wounded. On 29 September, clashes between M23 and Janvier Buingo Karairi's APCLS forces in Kaandja (Osso-Banyungu sector, Masisi Territory) left three civilians, including a woman, injured.

== October 2025 ==
In a report released on 2 October, UN Secretary-General António Guterres accused M23 of grave abuses and continued expansion in eastern DRC. The report said M23 extended control across Walikale and Masisi Territories, carrying out large-scale military operations against rival armed groups, notably the FDLR and Nyatura factions, and forcibly recruiting civilians, with 1,454 people arbitrarily detained and forcibly transferred to training camps in Rutshuru Territory. It cited large-scale killings, destruction, and displacement, including an operation carried out between 9–28 July in Bwisha Chiefdom that left 335 civilians dead, including 52 women and 24 children, across several farming areas, describing it as one of the deadliest incidents since M23's resurgence in 2022. The report noted M23's consolidation of parallel governance and justice systems, land redistribution, and expulsions, which intensified local tensions. That same 2 October, FARDC conducted a drone strike on M23 positions in Buleusa, which had been under rebel control for months. Three bombs were then dropped shortly after midnight. On 4 October, FARDC announced the surrender of sixteen M23 fighters and the arrest of twenty-three alleged collaborators in North Kivu. On 6 October, M23 captured Luke and Mulema in Masisi Territory after fierce clashes with Wazalendo, who retreated toward Ngululu as villagers fled to the bush or southward for safety. Speaking at the 76th session of the UNHCR Executive Committee, held from 6–10 October, Vice Prime Minister Jacquemain Shabani stated that the voluntary and organized return of Congolese refugees to M23-held areas would only be feasible after a ceasefire, restoration of state authority, and verification of returnees' nationality. On 8 October, the FARDC carried out a drone strike on the Minjenje Bridge between Walikale and Masisi Territories, which had been nearly rebuilt by M23 to move heavy weapons toward Pinga, destroying it and dealing a major blow to the rebels' logistics on the Kalembe–Pinga route.

On 14 October, the Congolese government and M23 signed a Ceasefire Monitoring and Verification Mechanism in Doha during the sixth round of talks mediated by Qatar. The accord, aligned with the 19 July Doha Declaration of Principles, aims to consolidate peace and silence the guns. That same day, FARDC accused M23 of massacring 39 civilians between 6–12 October, executing victims in Tongo, Kirumba, and Kagando, and burning homes in Rusinga, Buuma, and Mwigya. The army condemned the killings as crimes against humanity, vowing they would "not go unpunished". In Walikale Territory, Wazalendo forces attacked M23 positions in Chanjikiro (Kisimba groupement), driving the rebels out and pushing them toward Rusamambu in the neighboring Ikobo groupement. On 15 October, FARDC drones struck the Twangiza gold mine in Luhwinja Chiefdom, Mwenga Territory, occupied by M23 rebels. It was the second raid in five days, targeting mine warehouses without causing casualties. On 17 October, clashes erupted between two factions of the Wazalendo's Biloze Bishambuke (FABB) group in Kikonde village, Basikalangwa groupement, Fizi Territory, killing a Wazalendo commander and paralyzing village life. In Walikale Territory, 18 M23 fighters surrendered with their weapons to FARDC in Munsanga, Kisimba groupement, and were escorted by Wazalendo to Pinga, where they were handed over to military authorities and detained at the local camp. Meanwhile, the Congolese National Assembly officially recognized the genocide committed in eastern DRC, known as "Genocost". It instructed the government to establish a national day of commemoration, build a memorial, and launch awareness and justice initiatives, with recommendations sent to the President, UNHRC, ICC, and UN Secretary-General. In Nyiragongo Territory, the M23 rebels carried out a large-scale security sweep in Ngangi 3 village, Munigi groupement, north of Goma. The operation, enforced under a curfew-style lockdown, led to the arrest of several civilians, mostly young people.

On 18 October, the Sukola 2 South Kivu commander toured several localités in Shabunda Territory, denying reports of an M23 presence. That same day, the Minister of the Interior and Security, Decentralization, and Customary Affairs suspended the PPRD by decree, accusing it of complicity with M23; the decision was publicly announced on 27 October. On 22–23 October, unidentified drones bombed the Twangiza gold plant, hitting its fuel reservoirs and causing a major fire and heavy smoke. The main structure was spared as the strikes aimed to disrupt operations rather than destroy the site. Between 24–26 October, seven people were killed in renewed clashes between Wazalendo and M23 in Masisi Territory, particularly around Mbuhi village in Bashali-Mokoto. The fighting, sparked by Wazalendo assaults on M23 near Nyabiondo (Osso-Banyungu sector), continued through the night with heavy explosions. On 30 October, President Tshisekedi arrived in Paris for the Conference on Peace and Prosperity in the Great Lakes Region, co-organized with Togo, whose president Faure Gnassingbé serves as AU mediator for the eastern DRC crisis. The meeting, attended by the European Union, called for the neutralization of the FDLR, respect for Congolese sovereignty, the withdrawal of all foreign forces and military equipment, ensuring humanitarian access, and an inclusive intra-Congolese dialogue to support peace. The EU pledged continued diplomacy, €1 million to support AU mediation, €129 million in humanitarian aid, and funding for regional projects such as the Ruzizi III hydroelectric dam. French Foreign Minister Jean-Noël Barrot said reopening Goma International Airport for humanitarian use was a Qatari-led priority. However, M23 rejected the idea as "disconnected from realities on the ground", while Rwanda's foreign minister noted, "Goma airport is in the hands of M23 authorities… you cannot reopen an airport from Paris".

== November 2025 ==
=== 1–7 November ===
On 1 November, the Congolese government reported a surge in violence and human rights abuses, particularly in North and South Kivu under M23 control, recording 123 murders, 223 rapes, and hundreds of kidnappings, forced recruitments, and looting cases in October. Over 100 youths from Bukavu were reportedly abducted and forcibly conscripted between 14–28 October at Camp Sayo before being taken to an unknown location. The DRC reported over 270 civilians killed, 300 women sexually assaulted, and hundreds tortured across rebel-held areas in September and October. On 3 November, an M23 patrol was ambushed by CMC fighters near Mashango village in Bukombo in Rutshuru Territory, leaving dozens of civilians caught in the crossfire and at least 18 injured, while on 4 November, M23 rebels "permanently" closed the Lomera gold mine in the Luhihi groupement, north of Kabare Territory. The rebels gave no reason for the closure. Activist Jean-Chrisostome Kijana warned that Bukavu's economy was reportedly paralyzed, marked by nonfunctional banks, rising criminality, and severe financial distress for women indebted through mining-related loans. On 5 November, the EU urged the opening of a humanitarian corridor and the resumption of aid flights to reach civilians trapped by the conflict while condemning Rwanda's military presence in eastern DRC. That same day, M23 rebels conducted mass arrests in Masisi, rounding up between 200 and 400 young people, including minors, during a large cordon-and-search operation that sealed off roads around Masisi, Katale, and Lushebere. In Rutshuru Territory, at least four people were killed and seven were injured during two nights of armed attacks in Katsiru, where unidentified gunmen targeted M23-aligned local defense units, leaving four civilians and one member of the M23-aligned defense group dead and six others wounded, and another civilian fatally shot on 6 November, amid ongoing clashes between M23 and CMC/Nyatura forces in the area. That same 6 November, clashes between M23 and ANCDH/Wazalendo fighters in Kivuye left five civilians dead and five wounded before the rebels were pushed out by Wazalendo, while on 7 November Rwanda and Congo initialed in Washington a Regional Economic Integration Framework (REIF) during the Joint Monitoring Committee's fourth meeting — acknowledging delays in the peace deal, outlining economic cooperation and development measures, agreeing on immediate steps to neutralize the FDLR, advance disengagement, end Rwanda's "defensive measures", curb hostile rhetoric, reviewing Doha-process updates on prisoner exchanges, and welcoming the ceasefire monitoring mechanism's first meeting held on 5 November. That same day, President Tshisekedi announced that the DRC and Rwanda were close to signing a peace agreement.

=== 8–15 November ===
On 8 November, FARDC accused M23 of launching a series of attacks across South Kivu (Bulambula, Kibandamangobo, and Tuwe Tuwe with Twirwaneho support) and North Kivu (Kasopo and Kajinga), as well as attempting to advance toward Mount Irimwi in Lubero, urging U.S. and Qatari mediators to note these violations of ongoing peace commitments as the army asserted it had taken all necessary measures to protect civilians and defend the national territory. On 12 November, heavy fighting in Masisi Territory saw Wazalendo seize the Mulema village and M23 capture the Karere village, during which M23 rebels fired into the air after one of their officers was killed in an ambush along the Mokoto–Kibarizo road, inadvertently wounding a civilian in Mbuhi with a stray bullet. On 14 November, President Tshisekedi ordered his Interior, Transport, and Defense ministers to coordinate the security and logistics needed to reopen Goma International Airport in line with ICRC recommendations on aircraft protection, humanitarian movement, and broader safety guarantees. On 15 November, the Congolese government and the AFC signed the Doha Framework for a Comprehensive Peace Agreement in Doha. Though not a final peace deal, it set the structure, methodology, and two-week timetable for negotiations on humanitarian access to affected zones, security arrangements and DDR, restoration of state authority in rebel-held areas, return of displaced people and refugees, economic recovery in conflict-affected regions, transitional justice for victims, and to address root causes of the conflict, including combating discrimination, strengthening national unity, and promoting more inclusive governance. That same day, during the 9th ICGLR summit, member states backed the DRC peace process, demanded the withdrawal of foreign troops per UNSC Resolution 2373, condemned M23-ADF attacks, called for actions such as disarming Burundian armed groups (notably RED-Tabara), supporting the Central African Republic's April 2025 accord, improving humanitarian access, and advancing FDLR neutralization under the Luanda Concept of Operations, and also elected Tshisekedi as ICGLR president and appointed Zambia's Mubita Luwabelwa as executive secretary.

=== 16–22 November ===
On 16 November, M23 entered Shabunda Territory for the first time after overrunning FARDC positions in the strategic village of Maimingi, on the border with Walungu Territory. FARDC briefly resisted before retreating to Kimbili, and the fall of Maimingi placed the last M23-free area of South Kivu under rebel control. On 17 November, UPDF handed over five FARDC soldiers who had fled the occupation of Goma, and on 20 November, three days of fighting in Masisi Territory saw Wazalendo seize Kashanje and Nyampanika near Mweso as M23 captured several other villages, including Kasheke and Bituna in Osso-Banyungu sector, as well as the sector headquarters of Katoyi and Nyamaboko 1er, while in Washington on 19–20 November the DRC and Rwanda held the fourth Joint Security Coordination Mechanism session with the US, Qatar, and Togo to accelerate implementation of the June 2025 Washington Peace Agreement, with both parties reaffirming commitments to advancing the agreed Order of Operations meant to execute the Harmonized Plan, which focuses on FDLR neutralization, force disengagement, and lifting Rwanda's defensive measures inside Congo, and schedule a high-level follow-up meeting in Togo for 17 January to reinforce confidence-building and the broader regional peace process. That same 20 November, M23 rebels expanded their advance in Shabunda Territory by capturing Kimbili and Nyalubemba. On 21 November, Qatar's Emir Sheikh Tamim bin Hamad Al Thani arrived in Kinshasa for his first official visit, following two-day meetings with President Kagame in Rwanda to boost bilateral cooperation. Congolese Minister Daniel Mukoko Samba urged major Qatari investment in mining, infrastructure, transport corridors, energy, and logistics to support regional integration and the $21 billion framework signed earlier with Qatar's Al Mansour Holding. That same day, several Chinese gold-mining operators fled the M23-controlled Karhembu mining site in Bwahungu, on the Walungu-Shabunda-Mwenga border, after drone strikes hit the area the previous day. On 22 November, FARDC condemned a surge in M23 attacks despite commitments made in Doha and Washington, with spokesperson Maj. Gen. Sylvain Ekenge warning that the rebels' daily assaults endanger civilians in North and South Kivu and urging U.S. and Qatari mediators to intervene as the army may be forced to respond more forcefully if the violations continue. Meanwhile, Journaliste en danger (JED) reported that journalists in M23-occupied territories face extreme threats, including forced recruitment, the shutdown of local media, and what it called the "end of independent journalism", and also accused security services, intelligence agencies, certain authorities, and political actors of repeated violations against press freedom.

=== 23–28 November ===
During the night of 23–24 November, the civil society coalition Pamoja kwa Amani reported that M23 rebels arrested and summarily executed at least 12 civilians accused of collaborating with Wazalendo, including a patient taken from a health center, and also denounced other killings, such as the 21 November execution and mass burial of two young men from the same family in Kaniola in Walungu Territory. On 24 November, the United Nations Joint Human Rights Office (UNJHRO) reported a sharp rise in human rights abuses in the first half of 2025, documenting 2,767 violations (an 11% increase) and 8,635 victims (up 12%), with 86% occurring in conflict zones amid M23's intensified offensive in North and South Kivu, continued ADF and CODECO attacks in North Kivu and Ituri (which saw a 21% increase), 198 ADF-linked violations causing over 1,000 victims, and further noting that FARDC soldiers and police committed sexual violence against at least 70 victims. On 25 November, FARDC and Wazalendo clashed with M23 in Kilungutwe and Kasika in Mwenga Territory, reportedly killing at least ten civilians. On 27 November, President Kagame reignited tensions with Kinshasa by accusing the DRC of refusing to take responsibility for ending the eastern conflict and declining to negotiate with M23, arguing that the proposed humanitarian reopening of Goma International Airport should be discussed directly with the rebels who control the city, prompting spokesman Patrick Muyaya to accuse him of effectively claiming ownership of M23, denying the humanitarian crisis, and acting as the rebellion's "father", while the airport dispute, announced by President Emmanuel Macron but stalled with no timeline, has become a political standoff in which France blames M23 for blocking progress, Kinshasa insists it has met all requirements and considers the matter one of sovereignty, and M23 refuses to cede the strategic site while demanding conditions such as the return of banking institutions, which the Congolese government rejects. On 28 November, President Tshisekedi told the Congolese diaspora in Serbia that he would soon travel to Washington to endorse the U.S.-mediated peace agreement with Rwanda, stressing that it would not involve integrating rebels into national forces and reaffirming that genuine cooperation requires respect for Congolese sovereignty and the withdrawal of Rwandan troops.

== December 2025 ==
=== 1–4 December ===
On 1 December, the Congolese government banned all activities of President Kabila's political movement Sauvons le Congo, which had been launched in mid-October in Nairobi to oppose what it described as the government's "tyranny" and to defend national sovereignty. On 2 December, M23 launched coordinated attacks on FARDC positions across the middle and high plateaus of Uvira, Fizi, Mwenga, and Walungu Territories, which then triggered clashes in Kaziba Chiefdom around Nguka hill involving surface-to-air missiles that forced civilians to shelter indoors and later spread across multiple areas in the Ruzizi Plain, including Katogota, Luvungi, Lubarika, and Kamanyola. In Kamanyola, a shell struck a home and killed residents amid intense fighting, with consistent reports citing around ten civilians killed by shelling in Kaziba Chiefdom, three children killed in central Kamanyola, widespread destruction of schools and churches, dozens wounded, including a local journalist, and even heavier human and material losses across five groupements in Kaziba Chiefdom (Muhumba, Ngando, Bulumbwa, Kashozi, and Muchingwa), as the Congolese army accused M23 and Rwandan forces of launching coordinated attacks on FARDC positions in Kaziba Chiefdom, Katogota, and Lubarika to undermine ongoing U.S.- and Qatari-led peace efforts under the Washington and Doha processes. That same 2 December, FARDC regained control of Katogota, Kaziba Chiefdom, and Point Zéro in Fizi Territory — recovering weapons, ammunition, and bombs after routing M23 — while residents of Kamanyola fleeing toward Rwanda through Bugarama were initially blocked until the border opened on 3 December, the same day M23 again attacked FARDC positions in Katogota before being pushed toward Kamanyola, leaving the town split between FARDC control in the south and rebel control in the north up to the Rwandan border.

On 4 December, Presidents Tshisekedi and Kagame met in Washington to formally ratify the peace agreement their foreign ministers had initialed on 27 June. The accord was signed at the United States Institute of Peace following a brief trilateral meeting with President Donald Trump and attended by eight heads of state and representatives of Angola, Burundi, Kenya, Qatar, Togo, Uganda, the UAE, and the African Union Commission. The agreement contains five principal provisions: respect for territorial integrity; cessation of hostilities; disengagement and disarmament of non-state armed groups; conditional integration of some elements; the creation of a framework for regional economic cooperation; and halting all support to armed groups, including the FDLR and M23. It also establishes a joint security coordination mechanism, including the Concept of Operations (CONOPS), a framework for intelligence-sharing negotiated in Luanda in October 2024. Despite the peace deal, fighting persisted in Kamanyola, Katogota, Kaziba Chiefdom, central Mwenga Territory, and Kasika, drawing in FARDC, Burundian forces, Wazalendo, and M23, while in Kabare Territory stray bullets from clashes in Mudaka seriously injured at least three students, Luvungi emptied as roughly 80% of its residents fled toward Sange and Uvira en route to Burundi. Burundi's Foreign Minister Edouard Bizimana condemned the M23 bomb launched from the DRC that hit Cibitoke, calling it an unacceptable provocation and pledging "to protect the Burundian population". FARDC then withdrew to the Kabembe, Bulumbwa, and Muhumba groupements near Ntagereka, bordering the Bafuliiru and Kaziba Chiefdoms.

=== 5–7 December ===
By 5 December, reports differed on whether Kamanyola was fully or partially controlled by FARDC–Wazalendo and Burundian forces amid renewed violence that left at least seven people dead and six injured. In Fizi Territory, a helicopter traveling from Uvira to Kalemie crashed into Lake Tanganyika near Yungu, leaving four expatriate survivors and one confirmed death rescued by local fishermen, as administrator Samy Kalonji Badibanga dismissed social-media rumors that M23 had shot it down and insisted the crash had not been caused by any rebel attack, and the army had not yet issued an official statement. In Mutarule, a bomb fired from the Luvungi frontline, where M23, FARDC, Wazalendo, and Burundian forces were fighting, killed two people and injured 18. A video shared online shows several victims lying on the ground. Clashes were also reported in the Ironge forest in the Uvira Territory highlands, where Wazalendo and Burundian forces were present, while Twirweheno and M23 positioned themselves near the Bijojo charcoal market. On 6 December, Twirweheno and M23 seized Rurambo after crossing the Luvubu River and clashing with Wazalendo and Burundian forces. They advanced into Kahya on the Uvira–Walungu border, the two areas divided only by the river. Subsequent clashes were reported near Mukono and other highland areas of Uvira Territory. On 7 December, M23 took control of Luvungi after FARDC carried out a tactical withdrawal "to avoid a bloodbath". That same day, FARDC spokesperson Maj. Gen. Sylvain Ekenge reported that since 4 December the rebels had launched heavy-artillery bombardments from Bugarama toward densely populated areas of the Ruzizi Plain, striking localities between Kamanyola and Uvira, killing civilians, and destroying schools, a health center, and numerous homes in what the army denounced as an "odious crime" and "act of barbarism" that left families in fear and uncertainty. On 8 December, more than 30 people were killed and 20 wounded in Sange when FARDC and Wazalendo forces clashed after soldiers returning from the front were ordered not to continue toward Uvira, which prompted gunfire between the two sides before a bomb exploded and caused mass casualties. In Masisi Territory, FARDC conducted multiple drone strikes on M23 positions, hitting strategic hills in Katale, Masisi, and the Bukombo–Nyabiondo axis, without causing civilian casualties. That same day, the UN Group of Experts on the DRC reported that M23's military operations and parallel administrative structures indicate an intent to establish autonomous zones outside state authority, complete with administrative, judicial, fiscal, and security systems designed to entrench control and function as an alternative governance. The UN Experts noted that since April 2025, M23 intensified recruitment, training, coordinated troop movements, and offensive operations in North and South Kivu, supported by close coordination with Rwanda's army, which enabled M23 to expand its territorial reach and political influence. That same 8 December, the Burundian government warned that M23 plans to seize Uvira and advance toward Fizi Territory and Kalemie before Christmas.

=== 9–13 December ===
On 9 December, while Uvira was still officially under the control of the Congolese government, the advance of M23 forced more than 20,000 civilians to flee to Burundi. That same day, Human Rights Watch reported that thousands of Rwandan soldiers, including elite units, crossed into eastern DRC in support of M23. According to HRW, Rwandan and M23 forces entered Uvira after pushing out Congolese, Burundian, and allied Wazalendo troops, employing drones, heavy artillery, and other sophisticated weaponry. The operation caused substantial civilian casualties and widespread displacement, with dozens reported dead or wounded. By 10 December, calm had returned, with Uvira confirmed to be under FARDC and Wazalendo control, and with no indication of an M23 presence; daily activities resumed cautiously, though schools and markets operated at limited capacity. FARDC concentrated its defensive posture around Kalundu Port to the south, even as some inhabitants continued fleeing toward Burundi. However, at 11:30 a.m. that same day, Uvira ultimately fell to M23 without resistance. Witnesses reported rebel forces moving visibly through major streets, while others advanced toward Kavinvira on the Burundian border. The city's capture occurred without fighting, as FARDC had already withdrawn the previous day toward Swima, Makobola, and Baraka in Fizi Territory. Provincial authorities in South Kivu did not issue any formal response. In response, Burundi shut its border to prevent potential incursions. On 12 December, M23 rebels ordered residents of Kateku village in Ikobo, Walikale Territory, to vacate the area within three days, alleging that it was being used by Wazalendo fighters. That same day, Wazalendo simultaneously launched attacks on M23 positions in Malemo (Bashali Chiefdom) and Minjenje in the Wanianga sector of Walikale Territory to dislodge the M23 rebels from the occupied positions, as the Mpety-Kalembe section remained under M23 control. In Fizi Territory, thousands of families fleeing Uvira sought refuge in Mboko, fearing further rebel advances as FARDC, Burundian troops, and Wazalendo forces withdrew into the territory. Others crossed Lake Tanganyika into Burundi. In response to the growing number of Congolese refugees, the Burundian government, together with the UN refugee agency, opened a transit center in Rumonge to accommodate asylum seekers.

=== 14–20 December ===
On 14 December, M23 clashed with Wazalendo in Uvira Territory, with fighting starting in Lwanga along the Lake Tanganyika road to Fizi Territory before shifting to Makobola 1 village, where M23 fighters confronted Wazalendo forces as reinforcements were positioned in Makobola 2, located 55 kilometers north of Baraka on National Route 5 in neighboring Fizi Territory. Reports also noted shuttle boat movements on Lake Tanganyika originating from Lwanga. Later that day, M23 advanced through Kasekezi, about three kilometers away, and seized Makobola 2. Meanwhile, in Masisi Territory, FARDC carried out air strikes on M23 positions in Burora, the main town of the Banyungu groupement. On 15 December, M23 announced a unilateral withdrawal from Uvira as a confidence-building measure for the Doha peace process, amid strong U.S. pressure that warned Rwanda over alleged support for the group and described the Uvira offensive as a serious violation of the Washington agreements. Despite M23's withdrawal announcement, reports from North Kivu suggest that M23 was simultaneously reinforcing its positions in Lubero and Walikale Territories since 14 December, moving fighters and ammunition along key axes and toward Mpety near Pinga, sometimes with civilian assistance, which raised fears of new offensives against Pinga, Lubero-centre, Butembo, and Beni. Speaking in Kinshasa, U.S. Ambassador Lucy Tamlyn said Washington viewed the deal as the start of a longer peace process, warned it was ready to respond firmly to violations while prioritizing diplomacy, and stated that the United States was considering diplomatic, sanctions, and bilateral and multilateral measures to ensure compliance, reiterating that Rwanda must respect its commitments and withdraw its forces from Congolese territory. On 19 December, at a UN Security Council meeting on extending MONUSCO's mandate, the U.S. said M23's announced withdrawal from Uvira was inadequate and largely symbolic, insisting the group must pull back at least 75 km under the Washington framework while condemning continued rebel advances and Rwanda's support, a view shared by Congolese government, which argued the move was a diversion intended to ease international pressure as M23 expanded territory, installed parallel administrations, and consolidated control in eastern Congo.

=== 21–29 December ===
On 21 December, FARDC and Wazalendo attacked M23 positions in Makobola 1 and Makobola 2, areas considered critical gateways toward Maniema and Tanganyika provinces along National Route 5 and Lake Tanganyika. Wazalendo took up positions along the Pemba escarpments, while FARDC deployed in Kasekezi and Ngalula. The resulting insecurity led to civilian displacement toward Swima and Mboko. On 22 December, Wazalendo mounted further assaults on Makobola 1 and 2 but were unable to push M23 back; later, M23 fighters operating from Lake Tanganyika fired shots whose impacts reached Swima, roughly 8 km away, and despite FARDC reinforcements arriving in Kalemie, Mboko stayed under rebel control. On 23 December, M23 established a new position in Ndurumo village in the Luberike groupement of Walikale Territory, while Patrick Muyaya disputed M23's portrayal of rallies held in Uvira on 16 December, Kamanyola on 19 December, Goma on 22 December, and in Bukavu and Sake on 23 December as spontaneous, instead accusing the rebels and their Rwandan allies of coercing civilians into organized marches amounting to intimidation, psychological pressure, and violations of human rights and national sovereignty. On 24 December, an M23 unit patrolling the Goma–Rutshuru axis within Virunga National Park was ambushed by Wazalendo near Rumangabo, and FARDC simultaneously clashed with M23 in Makobola 1 and 2, capturing Rwandan soldiers and M23 fighters, reportedly 17 in total, with several casualties. M23 then withdrew from Makobola 1 and 2, as FARDC secured the surrounding hills of Kasekezi, Bangwe, Ngalula, and Makobola, while rebel forces concentrated along the Lwanga escarpments and the hills overlooking Kigongo, roughly 5 km from Uvira. On 26 December, FARDC launched airstrikes against rebel boats at Kalundu's public port, while in Walikale Territory, 30 M23 fighters fleeing intensified clashes in neighboring Masisi Territory, particularly in Osso Banyungu, surrendered to FARDC, raising the total number of rebels who had surrendered or been captured since early December 2025 to at least 165. On 28 December, as many as 42 women were abducted from their homes in Bukombo, Bwito Chiefdom, by M23 rebels on accusations of being Wazalendo's wives, before being tortured and taken to an unknown location. On 29 December, a joint FARDC–Wazalendo offensive against M23 positions in Masisi Territory led to the recapture of Katoyi, Mitimingi, Kahundu, Kasheke, and Kakoka. That same day, African Union ministers at the Peace and Security Council meeting called for faster implementation of the Washington and Doha peace processes, urged increased humanitarian assistance, and rejected parallel administrations in Congolese territory without explicitly naming Rwanda as an aggressor.

This same month, according to the United Nations Office for the Coordination of Humanitarian Affairs (OCHA), widespread sexual violence against women and girls was reported in North Kivu, particularly while traveling to Virunga National Park to collect food and firewood, with more than 3,380 cases of gender-based violence documented across Goma and Nyiragongo Territory.
