= Buleusa =

- Populated place
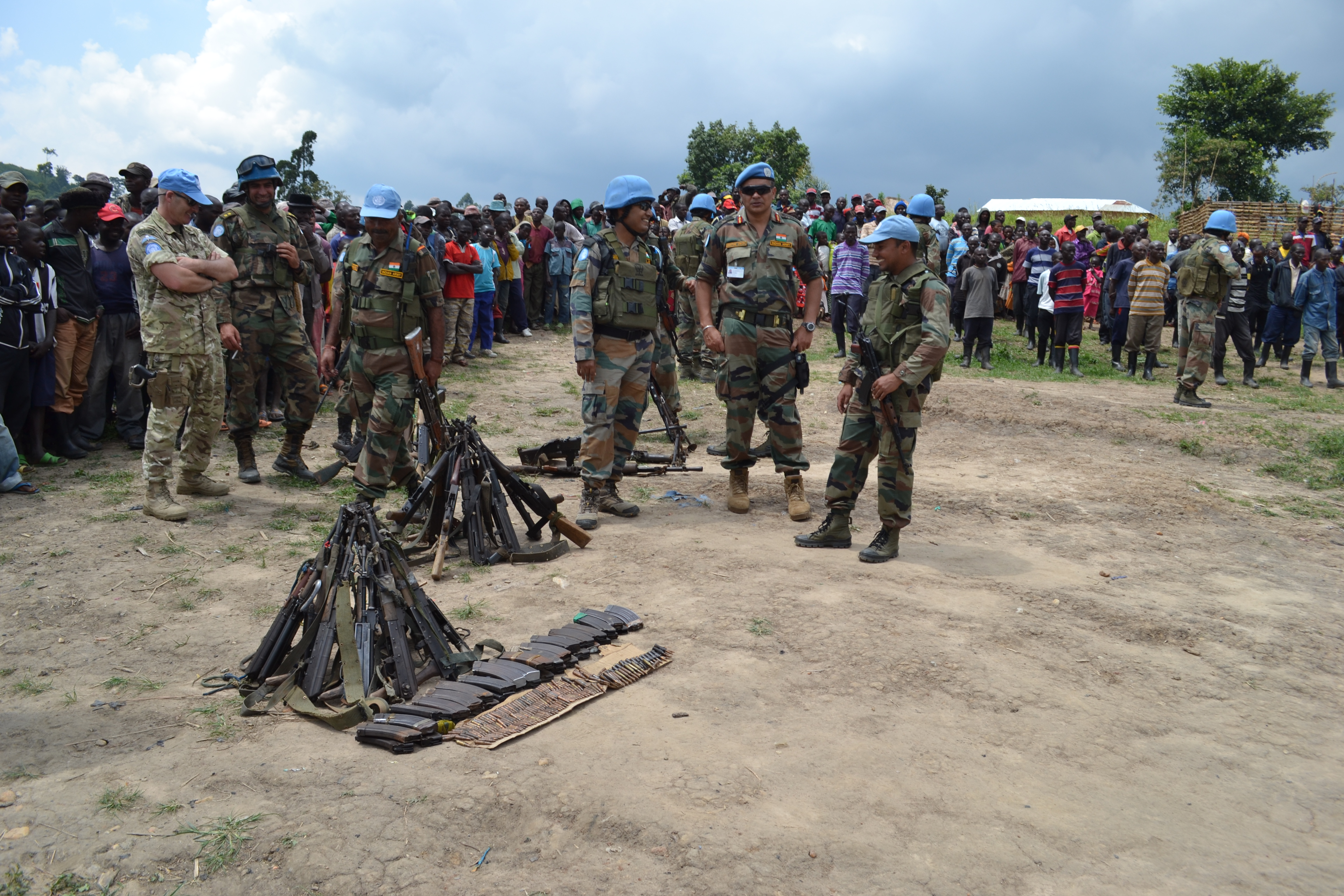
- Surrender of FDLR fighters in Buleusa, December 2014.

- Location in Democratic Republic of the Congo
- Coordinates: 0°46′16″S 28°59′21″E
- Country: Democratic Republic of the Congo
- Province: North Kivu
- Territory: Walikale Territory
- Time zone: UTC+2 (CAT)

Buleusa is a populated place in the Walikale Territory, the Democratic Republic of the Congo.

== History ==
Former headquarters of the Democratic Forces for the Liberation of Rwanda, it was captured on 26 November 2015 by the Nduma Defense of Congo-Renovated group during the Sukola II operation. Three days later the town was burned down by unidentified armed group. In June 2016, between 3,000 and 4,000 Hutus were refugees in the camp run by the Armed Forces of the Democratic Republic of the Congo; they were hiding from the Kobos, who were trying to chase them away from the territory.
