= Journaliste en danger =

Journaliste en danger (JED) is an independent, non partisan non-profit organization (French: association à but non lucratif) founded on November 20, 1998, in Kinshasa, Democratic Republic of Congo, on the initiative of a group of Congolese journalists for the defence and promotion of the press freedom in that country.

JED was founded out of the concern that press freedom was being violated and that journalists had become victims of unfair justice. JED is not an association reserved solely for journalists, but rather a wholly independent and open structure to all those who feel like having a vocation to defend and promote their right to inform and to be informed freely without any restriction.

Since May 2003, JED has been active in eight other Central African countries: Burundi, Cameroon, Congo Brazzaville, Gabon, Equatorial Guinea, The Central African Republic, Rwanda and Chad.

JED is a member of the International Freedom of Expression Exchange, a global network of non-governmental organisations that monitors freedom of expression worldwide and defends journalists, writers, internet users and others who are persecuted for exercising their right to freedom of expression.

== Awards and honors ==
- 2005 Hermann Kesten Prize
- 2006 Prix RSF/Maison de France du défenseur de la liberté de la presse
