= Ikobo =

Village in the Democratic Republic of the Congo

Coordinates: 01°36′00″N 31°38′01″E

Ikobo is a groupment within Wanyanga sector within Walikale Territory in North Kivu province of the Democratic Republic of the Congo. It is located about a day's walk from the Uganda-DRC border.

== History ==
The village was abandoned in 2000, following a series of raids by Pareco militiamen.
