= Makobola 1 =

Groupement in Bavira Chiefdom, DR Congo

Makobola 1 Kamba-Makobola
- Grouping
- Groupement de Makobola 1
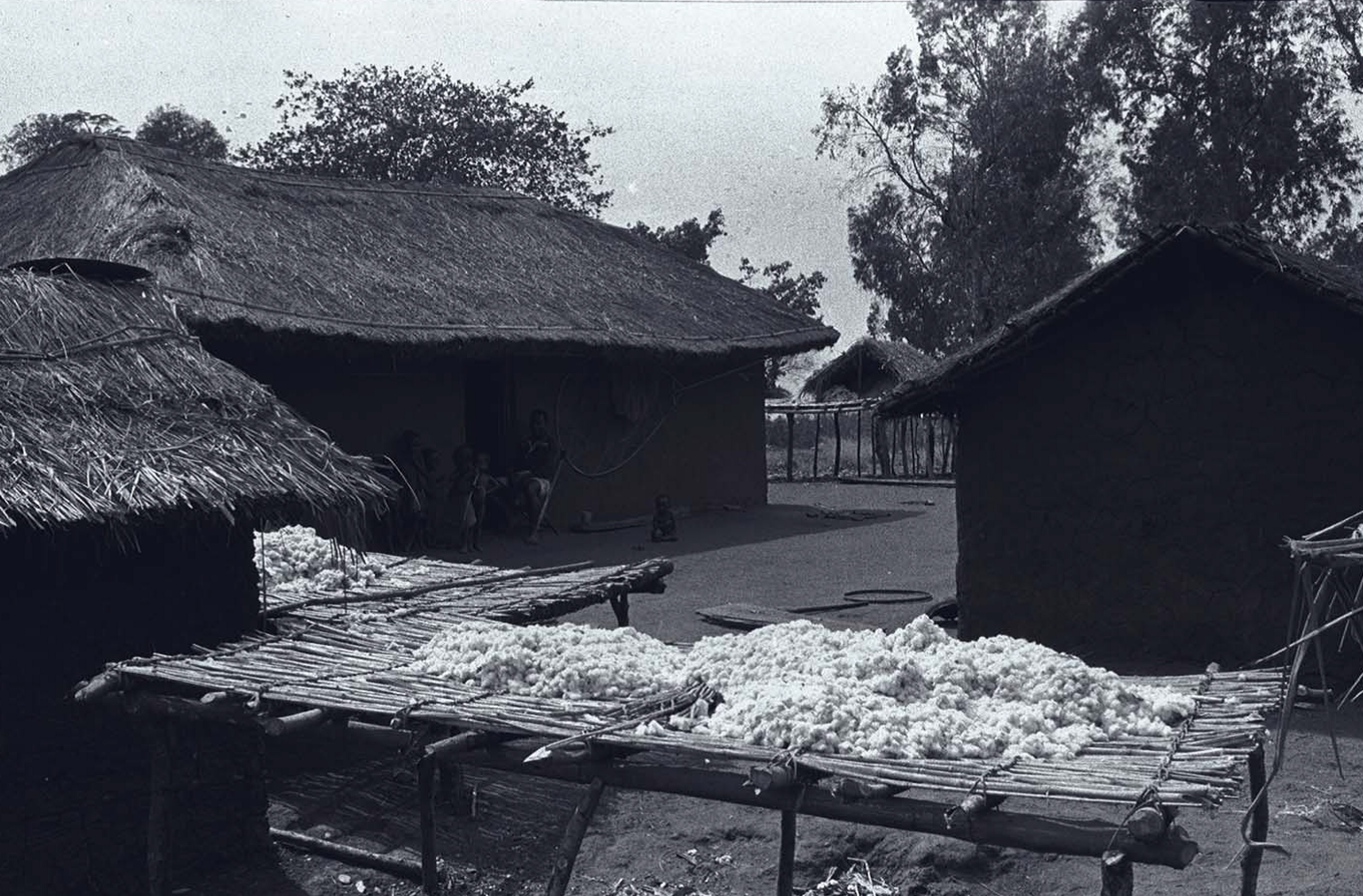
- Makobola 1 in 1954
- Country: Democratic Republic of the Congo
- Province: South Kivu
- Territory: Uvira
- Chiefdom: Bavira

Population (2004 est.)
  - Total: 4,333
- Official language: French
- National language: Kiswahili

Makobola 1, also known as Kamba-Makobola, is a groupement in the Bavira Chiefdom of Uvira Territory, located in the South Kivu province in the eastern Democratic Republic of the Congo. As of 2004, it had an estimated population of 4,333 people. The groupement is bordered to the north by Kalungwe groupement, to the south by Fizi Territory particularly I'amba Basilwamba village, to the east by Lake Tanganyika, and to the west by the Mitumba Mountains.

== Administration and governance ==
Makobola 1 is administered by a chef de groupement (groupement chief), who serves as the local customary authority and represents the Mwami (paramount chief) of the Bavira Chiefdom. Under customary law, the Mwami retains traditional authority over land tenure and allocation, a system that at times diverges from the Congolese Constitution, which guarantees private property rights under Article 34. Despite this legal duality, customary and state authorities generally cooperate, although disputes over land management and jurisdiction periodically arise. The position of chef de groupement is hereditary and traces its legitimacy to the Mwami. The chief exercises administrative and customary authority, assisted by a council of elders, which advises on governance, conflict mediation, and the observance of customary norms. The chef de groupement presides over local administration, customary justice, and community dispute resolution. Minor cases are handled at the local level by designated trial leaders, while more serious matters are referred to the Mwami.

Administratively, Makobola 1 is subdivided into several villages (localités), each headed by a chef de localité (village chief), who represents the chef de groupement at the village level. These officials are supported by chefs de sous-village or chefs de quartier, who oversee sub-village administration, including tax collection and local governance.

== History ==
=== Precolonial period ===
Before the Berlin Conference of 1884–1885, the region now known as Uvira Territory was defined by indigenous settlement structures, participation in Arab–Swahili slave-trading networks, and eventual incorporation into Leopold II's Congo Free State. The dominant indigenous populations were the Bavira and Bafuliiru, who subsequently experienced varying degrees of intermixing with neighboring groups such as the Barundi, Banyamulenge, Babembe, and Bashi.

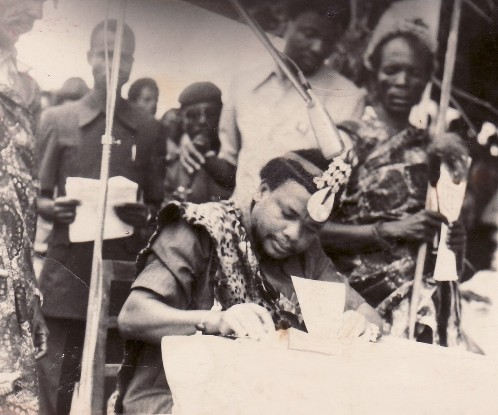
Mwami Lenghe III Rugaza Kabale (father of Mwami Lwegeleza III) in 1987.

Accounts by early European observers suggest that Uvira Territory and sections of the western lakeshore were historically under the control of the Bahamba dynasty of the Fuliiru. This polity, often referred to as the "Hamba Kingdom", was centered at Lemera, in the northwestern Ruzizi Plain. According to Congolese historian Shimbi Kamba Katchelewa, as cited in Charles Katembo Kakozi's 2005 study Facteurs socio-politiques explicatifs des conflits dans la région des Grands Lacs Africains, the earliest Fuliiru settlers originated from Lwindi (present-day Lwindi Chiefdom) and later established settlements in Mulenge, Luvungi, and Lemera between the 10th and 14th centuries, which laid the basis for the "Hamba Kingdom" under Bahamba clan leadership. Other scholars, including Kingwengwe Mupe and Bosco Muchukiwa Rukakiza, place the migration of the Fuliiru from Lwindi at a later date, around the 17th century. Historian Bishikwabo Chubaka notes that the region was initially sparsely populated, allowing new groups to settle provided they acknowledged the symbolic authority of the Bahamba Mwami, whose influence was strongest near the royal court. Distant chiefs often pledged allegiance without strict subordination. One such figure was Lenghe of Vira, remembered in Bavira oral traditions as the progenitor of several ruling lineages. A subject of the Mwami of Lwindi Chiefdom, Lenghe migrated to the northwestern shore of Lake Tanganyika, where oral accounts state he settled after following a buffalo from Lwindi to Kabungulu, where he killed it and, impressed by the abundance of game, chose to remain. Additional followers, primarily hunters from villages such as Muhinga, Nabaganda, Nakwinga, and Nyakabaka, were later dispatched by Mwami Nalwindi. After their arrival, Lenghe's group recognized the authority of Mwami Lwamwe Lwe Mbakwe, the third ruler of the Bahamba dynasty, who encouraged their settlement to consolidate his realm. Over time, Lenghe's followers diverged economically from the interior Fuliiru by adopting fishing practices from the Bazoba and relying increasingly on lake resources, which contributed to the emergence of the Bavira as a distinct political and cultural group. Chubaka also notes that Lenghe gradually asserted independence from Bahamba authority, and notably conducted military campaigns against the Babembe, pushing them as far as the Sandja River, without seeking approval.

=== Barundi migrations, colonial administration, and post-colonial conflict ===
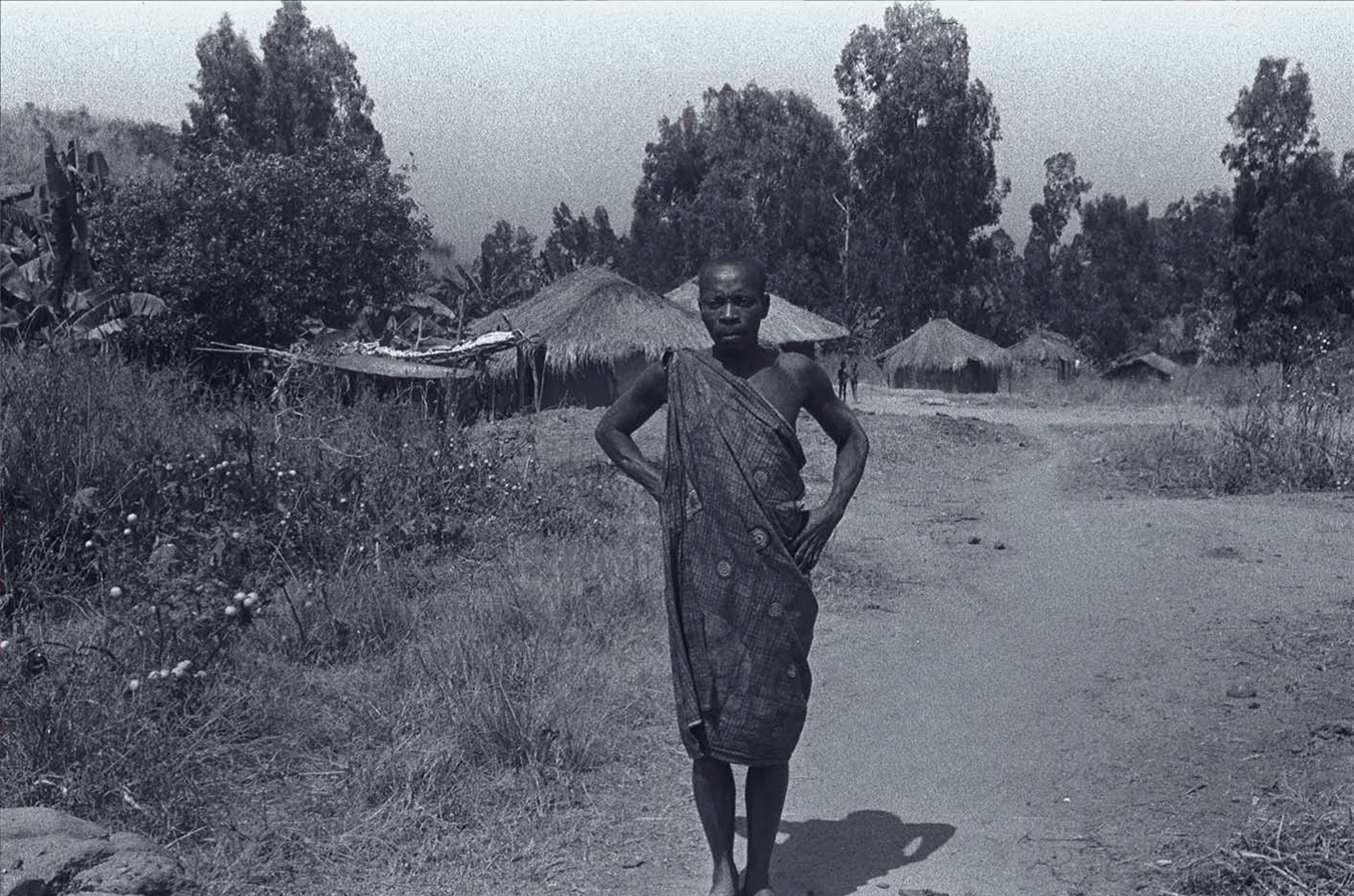
A Vira man wearing traditional dress, photographed in Makobola 1 in 1954.

It was during the period of territorial transformation that Barundi migrants from the left bank of the Ruzizi River settled within Fuliiru-Bavira lands. Colonial administrators René Loons and Van der Ghote reported that around 1800, a Burundian prince of the Nyakarama lineage, Ndorogwe, established settlements at Mwihongero near Kiliba and at Kihebo in the Ruzizi delta, and gradually expanding northward to Sange. Historian Jacques Depelchin notes that many of these migrants were of Hutu ethnicity. Other accounts, including those of colonial administrator E. Simons, suggest that by the mid-19th century, a vassal of Burundian Mwami Ntare II, named Rugendeza of the Banyakahama lineage, was active along the shores of Lake Tanganyika and the Ruzizi River. Rugendeza reportedly fled Burundi due to heavy salt levies imposed by the Mwami. Following his death, allegedly by poisoning after openly opposing Ntare II, his successor Kinyoni severed ties with the Burundian monarchy and relocated the community also north into the Ruzizi Plain, and eventually settled in Luberizi.

On 18 August 1928, Uvira Territory was formally established and divided into three customary chiefdoms: Bafuliiru, Bavira, and Barundi. This administrative structure was codified by Ordinance-Law No. 21/91 of 25 February 1938, which defined territorial boundaries. In 1961, amid escalating political and ethnic tensions, the Barundi Chiefdom was renamed the Ruzizi Plain Chiefdom following pressure from Bafuliiru leaders.

The earliest rulers of Makobola 1 were members of the Bahalu clan of the Vira people, who migrated from the south under the leadership of Bahalu, who governed the area until his death. Subsequent leadership has remained within the same clan. Later settlement waves included Fuliiru from the Bahamba clan, which originated from the mid-altitude plateaus; Babembe migrants during the reign of Chief Kotikoti; and, beginning in the 1940s, Barundi refugees fleeing insecurity in Burundi, particularly conflicts involving Hutu and Tutsi royal factions.

=== Armed conflict ===
From the mid-20th century onward, Makobola 1 was repeatedly affected by armed conflict, notably the 1964 Mulelist rebellion, which caused significant loss of life, widespread displacement toward Burundi's mountainous regions, and extensive looting, followed by a second Mulelist uprising in 1967 that resulted in the killing of Chief Kotikoti Mulumba. The war also affected the neighboring I'amba Basilwamba village. During colonial time, Makobola was a village in Uvira territory while on Fizi territory side, the village was Kamba Basilwamba. Both villages were separated by river Kambakulu. However, when the right-holder chief of Basilwamba of I'amba village was refugee in Burundi due to the 1964 war, an interim chief nicknamed the village Makobola II to change its identity. During the First Congo War in October 1996, forces of the Alliance of Democratic Forces for the Liberation of Congo (AFDL) carried out massacres of civilians, looted property, destroyed socio-economic infrastructure, and forced a large part of the population to flee to Tanzania. In August 1998, during the Second Congo War, the Rally for Congolese Democracy (RCD), a Rwandan-backed rebel group, committed widespread abuses, including looting and human rights violations. Between 30 December 1998 and 2 January 1999, RCD forces killed more than 800 civilians, predominantly members of the Babembe community, in neighboring Fizi Territory, specifically in the village of I'amba Basilwamba (nicknamed Makobola II), encompassing I'amba, Bangwe, Katuta, Mikunga, and Kasekezi.

In the 2000s, Makobola 1 experienced worsening insecurity, and on 20 September 2012, authorities imposed a curfew after armed incidents, including a grenade attack in Uvira that injured at least one person, and also restricted traffic on the Makobola–Kiliba road. On 19 January 2013, former Mai-Mai Yakutumba and Parti d'Action et de la Reconstruction du Congo–Force Armée Alléluia (PARC-FAAL) fighters who had surrendered to FARDC launched a provincial-backed sensitization campaign urging other armed groups in South Kivu to disarm, but subsequent shortages of food and shelter in regroupment camps in Makobola 1 and tensions over alleged unequal treatment nearly sparked clashes with FARDC and reportedly led some ex-combatants to extort civilians at the Makobola 1 road barrier. On 9 February, FARDC's 10th Military Region commander, Gen. Pacifique Masunzu, called on armed groups in Uvira Territory and Fizi Territory to assemble at Makobola 1, Kashatu, and Lubanga for integration into the army, as part of a wider sensitization campaign that had already gathered about 400 fighters from groups including Mayele, Kashoroko, Bwasakala, Muhasha, and the Force populaire pour la libération du Congo (FPLC), which had earlier declared its willingness to join FARDC to help defend national territory against the M23 rebellion. These efforts were consistent with earlier calls by the FARDC, notably in October 2011 under the "Amani Leo" military operation, which urged all national and foreign militias active in North and South Kivu to lay down their arms unconditionally and integrate into state security structures. On 1 April 2013, William Yakutumba held a public rally in Makobola II of Fizi Territory, during which he called on youth to enlist in FARDC and urged his fighters to abandon armed activity and join the regular army. He explained that his decision followed an appeal from the head of state and reflected his intention to defend the country against external threats, after surrendering on 24 March in Sebelé with his wife and approximately sixty escorts, a move that was welcomed locally and facilitated by transport to the Sebelé regroupment site. Formerly a FARDC major before defecting, Yakutumba later led a militia accused of multiple abuses, including a deadly attack on livestock herders in Kikonde, Fizi Territory, in August 2012 that left two people dead and several cattle stolen, as well as earlier clashes that resulted in FARDC expelling his group from Kazimiya, Fizi Territory, in May 2012.

On 20 November 2013, Emmanuel Ndigaya Ngezi, president of the Mai-Mai Mouvement du Peuple pour la Défense du Congo (MPDC), urged fighters loyal to "General" Mayele Wilondja to disarm and prepare for integration into FARDC, citing assurances from the national military hierarchy for the absorption of about 1,200 militiamen and the group's willingness to defend the country after M23's defeat. In January 2014, Yakutumba resumed operations in the bush between Fizi Territory and Uvira Territory and established a new camp in the Madjaga forest after moving from Rusororo near Makobola II toward the southern plateaus, where his group was reportedly attacked by FDLR fighters, following the earlier expulsion of his militia from Sebelé and the escape of dozens of fighters who had been transferred for integration in Nyamunyunyi. On 28 September 2017, FARDC repelled a Yakutumba militia attack on Uvira launched via Lake Tanganyika, pushed the fighters more than 25 km from the city, secured Makobola 1, and continued advancing toward Fizi Territory amid fighting in Swima. According to FARDC's spokesperson in South Kivu, Major Louis Claude Tshimwanga, three militiamen were captured, and two wooden rebel boats were sunk on Lake Tanganyika by FARDC fire.

As part of the renewed M23 campaign, clashes occurred on 14 December 2025 between M23 and Wazalendo forces in Uvira Territory. Fighting began in Lwanga along the Lake Tanganyika road toward Fizi Territory before shifting to Makobola 1, where M23 fighters confronted Wazalendo units while reinforcements were positioned in Makobola 2, located 55 kilometers north of Baraka on National Route 5 in neighboring Fizi Territory. Later that day, M23 advanced through nearby Kasekezi and captured Makobola 2.

== Socio-economic aspect ==
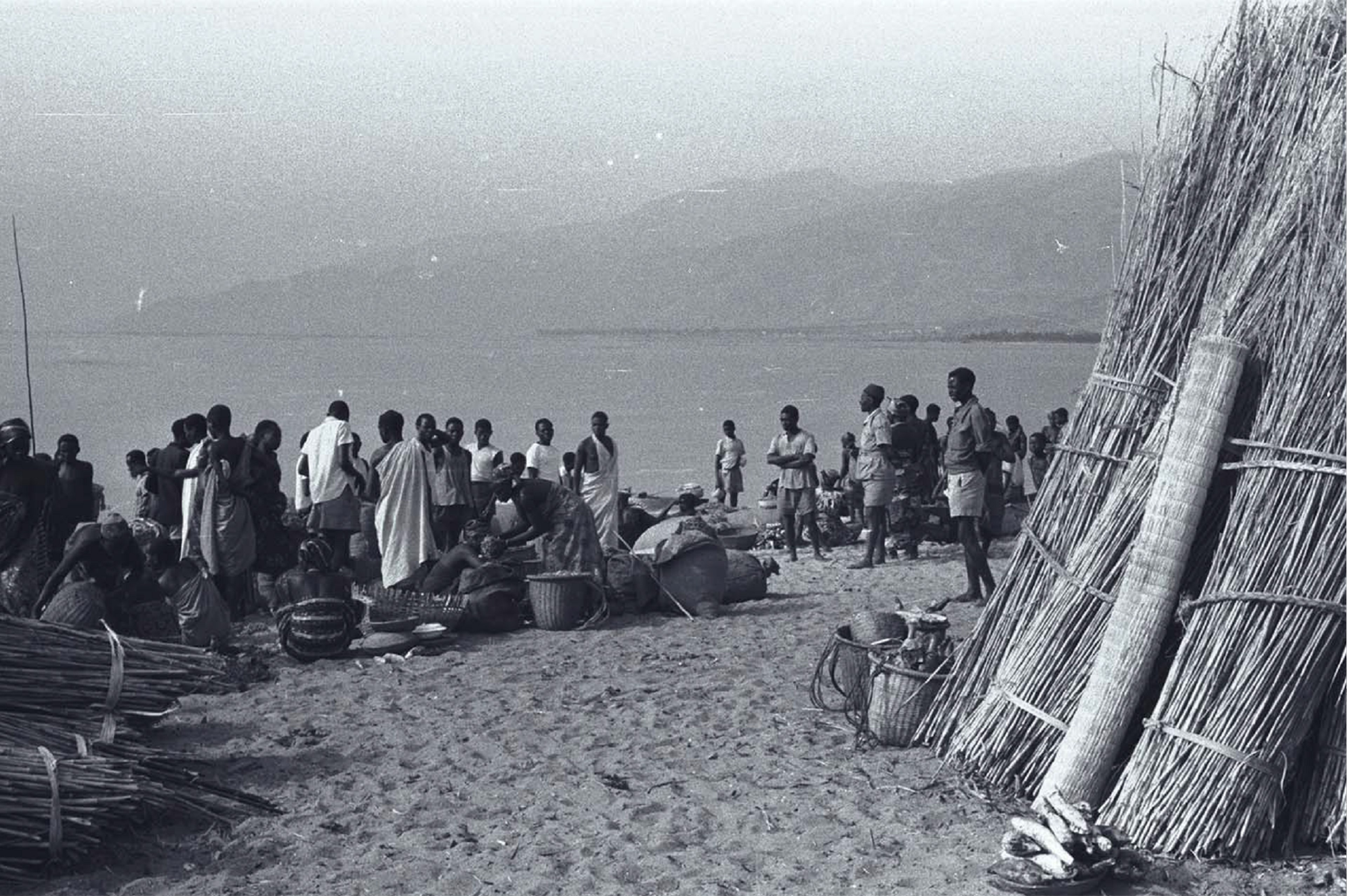
On the shores of Lake Tanganyika: Kilibula march in the Bavira Chiefdom in 1954.

Health care in Makobola 1 groupement originated in 1960 with the opening of a dispensary at Kasenya by Protestant missionaries, after which other health facilities were established by the Kimbanguist and Catholic churches. Educational facilities emerged through a similar missionary initiative: the Catholic Church initially established a school in Kalomo, which was subsequently relocated closer to the main road and renamed Shirika Primary School. In 1968, Protestant missionaries established a second institution, Kamba Primary School, which offered a complete primary cycle. At present, the groupement is served by three primary schools and one secondary school.

Economically, Makobola 1 relies primarily on agriculture, fishing, small-scale trade, and animal husbandry, with crop production centered on cassava, groundnuts, and beans, and fishing practiced through artisanal methods.
