= Sange River =

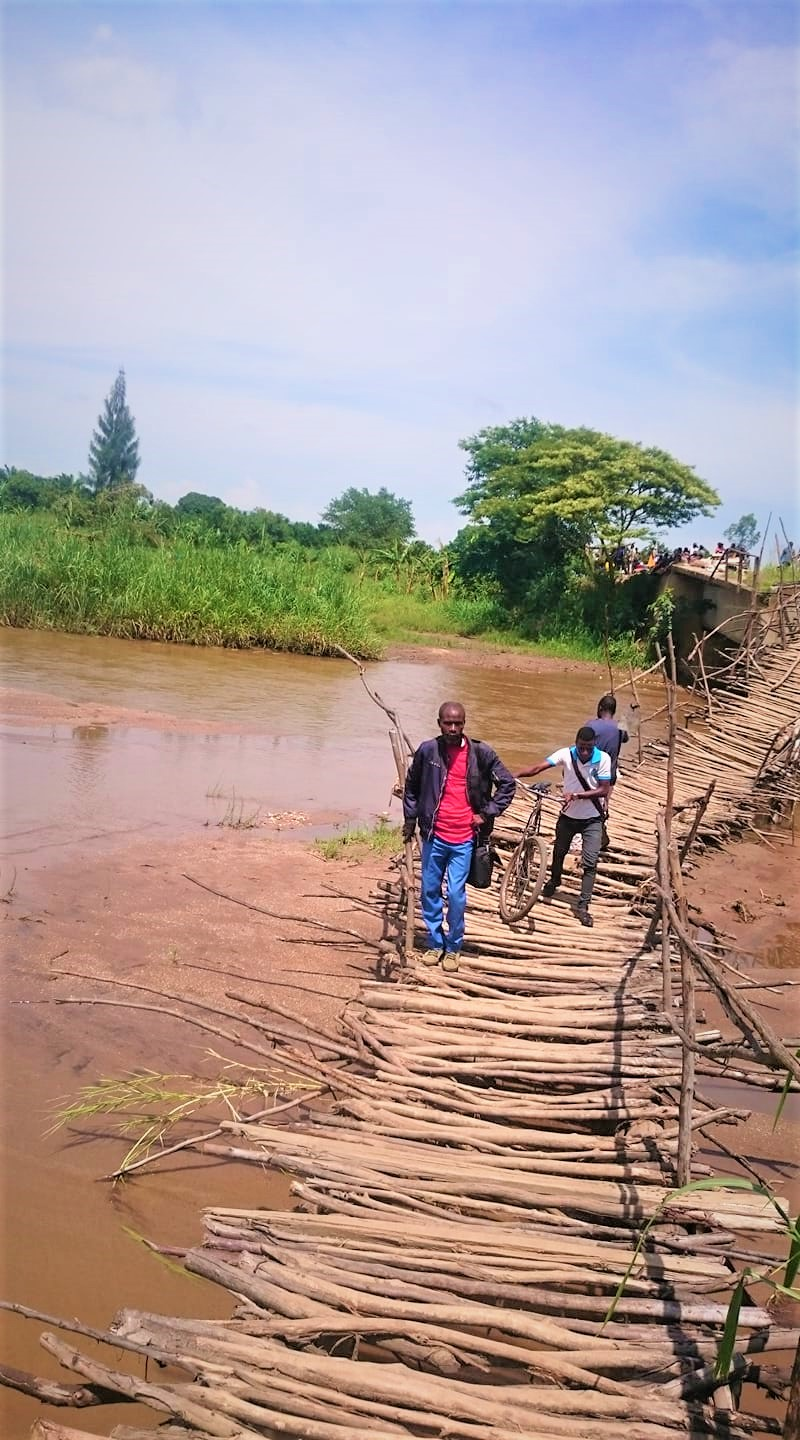
- Sange River, April 2022

Location
- Country: Democratic Republic of the Congo

Physical characteristics
- Mouth: Ruzizi River
  - coordinates: 3°03′31″S 29°15′06″E

The Sange River is a tributary of the Ruzizi River in the eastern part of the Democratic Republic of the Congo. It serves as a reliable source of water for domestic and commercial use, and families living along its banks rely on its pristine waters for drinking, cooking, and household chores. Local businesses depend on the river's abundant supply to meet the needs of visitors and tourists. Moreover, the river's flow sustains an ecosystem of services.

== Location ==
The river rises in the western part of the Ruzizi Plain in the Uvira Territory in the South Kivu province and joins the Ruzizi River across the Plain. As it courses through the region, the river gathers water from smaller streams and tributaries, including Luvua River in Sange, Luvimvi River in Katogota, the Luvubu River in Lubarika, the Luvungi River in Luvungi, the Luberizi River in Luberizi, and the Runingu River in Runingu. The upper Sange valley has traditionally been occupied by Kifuliiru-speaking agriculturalists and herders who have thrived in the area, relying on the valley's resources for their sustenance and livelihoods.

== History ==
When Henry Morton Stanley joined David Livingstone at Ujiji to explore the mouth of the Ruzizi River, Stanley discerned that the Sange River served as a tributary to the expansive Ruzizi River. During the Belgian Congo period, a bridge was erected over the river to facilitate the crossing of obstacles such as rivers, valleys, or highways. However, on 17 April 2020, the bridge collapsed due to torrential rainfall in Sange and its surrounding areas.

== 2020 torrential rainfall ==
In April 2020 torrential rains and overflowing tributaries in Uvira inundated homes, including the Sange Bridge, which collapsed under the immense pressure of the river's surge. The bridge's pillars failed after being severely eroded. The downpours also disrupted the economic and social lives of residents in Sange. Official reports indicated 24 bodies were recovered, 3,500 houses were damaged, and other significant losses were noted. According to UM News, the United Methodist Church's official news outlet, nearly 70,000 people were left homeless.
