= Sange, Democratic Republic of the Congo =

Town in the Democratic Republic of the Congo

Sange
- Commune
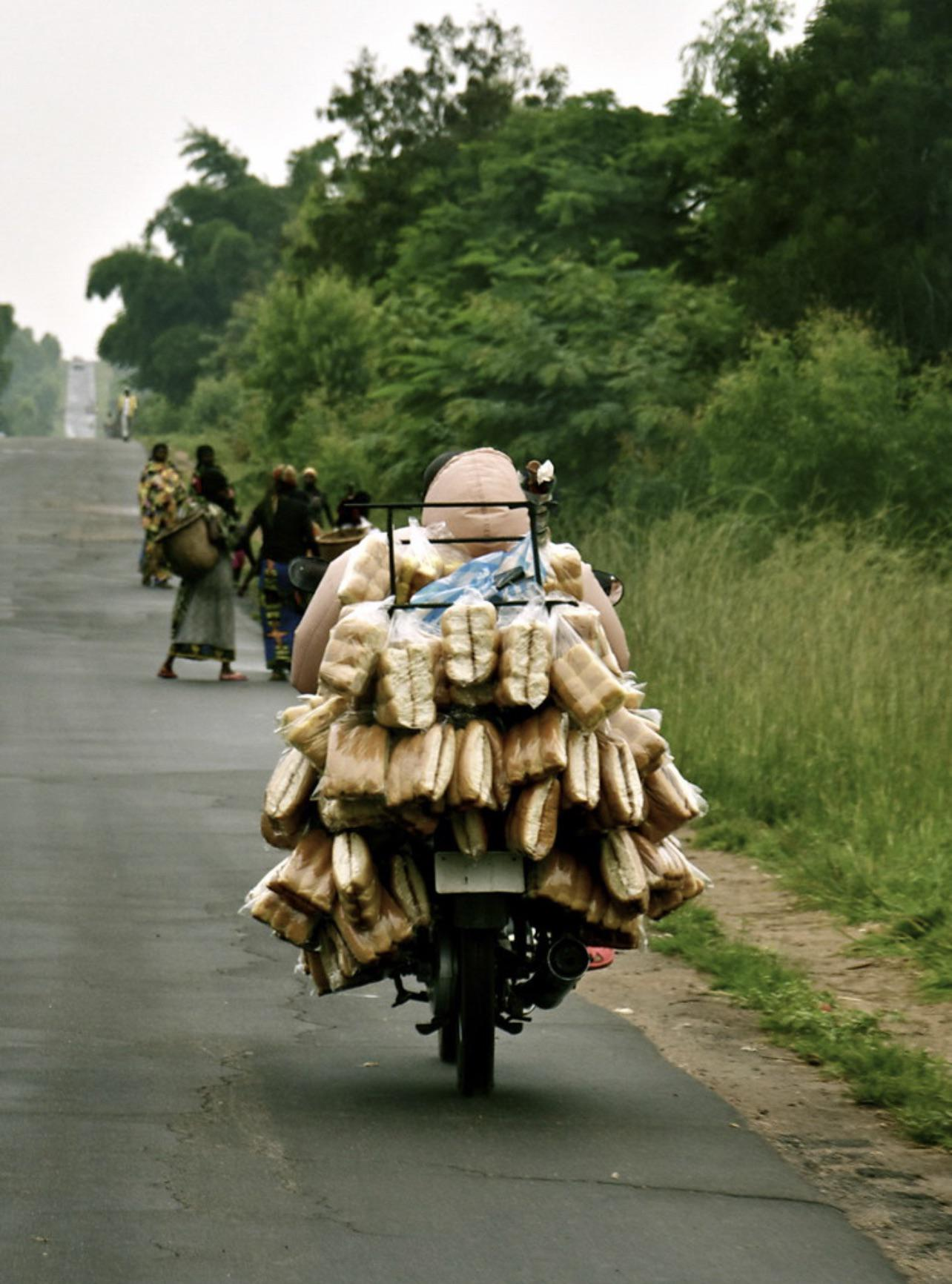
- A motorcyclist transporting a load in Sange

- Location within Democratic Republic of the Congo
- Country: Democratic Republic of the Congo
- Province: South Kivu
- Territory: Uvira

Population (2004 est.)
  - Total: 32,151
- Time zone: UTC+2 (CAT)

Sange is a commune of Uvira Territory, located in the South Kivu province in the eastern Democratic Republic of the Congo. One of the three officially recognized communes in the territory, alongside Kiliba and Luvungi, Sange had approximately 32,279 registered voters as of 2018. The commune lies at an altitude of 1,021 meters, about 24 kilometers (15 miles) west of the border with Burundi. Located in the central part of the territory, Sange is bordered to the north by the Luberizi groupement, to the south and east by the Kabunambo groupement (Ruzizi Plain Chiefdom), and to the west by the Kigoma groupement of the Bafuliiru Chiefdom.

Sange is situated in a predominantly sandy region, featuring a mix of sandy-loam and sandy-clay soils, making it one of the most fertile lands in Uvira Territory. Geologically, the area falls within the northwest basin of Lake Tanganyika and is characterized by a combination of Precambrian and Quaternary rock formations. A swift examination of Sange's morphology suggests that black soils of the Chernozem group, Solonchak soils, and Alkali soils characterize the region.

The region is widely known for its 2010 fuel tank explosion, which killed at least 235 people, including about 60 children assembled to watch the 2010 FIFA World Cup, were burned to death, and approximately 196 were injured, some of whom suffered severe burns, according to the United Nations Organization Stabilization Mission in the Democratic Republic of the Congo (MONUSCO).

== Geography ==
The average monthly air temperature is between 22.5° and 25 °C; the monthly average daily maximum temperatures increase at the end of the dry season (30.5° to 32.5° in September), while the monthly average daily minimum temperatures are lowest during half of the dry season (14.5° to 17 °C in July). The monthly relative insolation generally oscillates between 35 and 60% from October to April and between 50 and 80% from May to September, with July being the sunniest month.

== History ==
The area now known as Sange was historically part of a largely uninhabited savannah within Uvira Territory. While the broader territory was initially settled by the Fuliiru people, who had migrated from Lwindi (now the Lwindi Chiefdom) to establish themselves along the Ruzizi Plain in the northern and northwestern parts of Uvira Territory, the specific area of Sange remained largely unsettled and populated by wild animals until the early 20th century. Sange was eventually inhabited through two significant waves of migration, beginning with displaced Barundi Hutus from neighboring Burundi who sought and obtained grazing rights in the Ruzizi Plain from the Mwami of the Fuliiru. The second wave involved Fuliiru from the mid-plateaus, including areas such as Lubarika, who settled in the region over time.

The administrative organization of the area began to take formal shape with the creation of the Uvira Territory on 18 August 1928, which was divided into three customary chiefdoms: Bafuliiru, Bavira, and Barundi. This structure was further codified under Ordinance-Law No. 21/91 of 25 February 1938, which outlined the territorial boundaries, with Sange becoming the groupement of the Ruzizi Plain Chiefdom. In 1961, amid political and ethnic tensions, the Barundi Chiefdom was renamed the Ruzizi Plain Chiefdom under pressure from the Bafuliiru, a move that provoked strong opposition from the Barundi population and ultimately led to armed conflict between the two groups. Barundi fled to Burundi, creating a power vacuum that led to the appointment of Makike as head of the Ruzizi Plain Chiefdom and Balibwa as chief of the Sange groupement. After a series of negotiations facilitated by their Mwami Kinyoni, the Barundi regained control of the Ruzizi Plain Chiefdom, with Kinyoni first appointing Kinenwa as interim chief, who was later replaced by Biyaka. During the Mulelist Rebellion of 1964, the entire population fled to Burundi, but they gradually returned in the following years. The First Congo War resulted in significant human losses, widespread looting, and the displacement of residents to Tanzania, while the Second Congo War also aggravated the situation and led to severe destruction and Mai-Mai uprisings in the region.

By July 2015, unidentified gunmen caused six deaths in a month across Bwegera, Sange, Rukobero, Namijembwe, and Rushima. Victims included a man shot on his way home in Bwegera, a herder in Namijembwe, a middle-aged man in Sange, and the local chief of Rukobero, who was murdered in his own house. On 31 July 2020, an intoxicated FARDC soldier fired multiple shots that killed at least 12 people and injuring nine others in Sange.

=== Administrative history and divisions ===
The local administrative history traces back to Chief Kere, a Vira leader credited with founding the villages of Kibogoye (located in Sange), Kagando (currently within the Ruzizi Plain Chiefdom), and Kakamba (now situated in the Luvungi groupement). During this period, Sange lay in the area known as the "Bafuliiru territory" (present-day Bafuliiru Chiefdom), under the authority of Mwami Kalingishi, who granted extensive grazing lands to Burundian pastoralists settled in the Ruzizi Plain. Over time, however, the Barundi community, led by Ndabagoye, came under considerable European influence, leading to administrative reorganization that transferred authority from the Barundi to Chief Kere.

Following this transition, a Burundian notable named Ndalishize of the Ndorogwe family governed under Chief Kere's supervision, and upon his death, he was succeeded by his son Ngarukiye, who was later deposed due to misconduct and replaced by Mr. Biyaka, also of Burundian origin. Biyaka established a secondary customary tribunal from the Ndalishize lineage and maintained cooperative relations with Ngarukiye throughout his tenure, ruling between 1977 and 1978, after which Bigere Nankuma succeeded him until he died in 1988. That same year, Sange was officially detached from the Ruzizi Plain Chiefdom in 1988, when it was elevated to the status of a Cité. Leadership then passed to Mkwana Zakabemba, appointed as the first Chef de cité of Sange.

The succession of Chef de cité is recorded as follows:

1	Mkwana Zakabemba	Appointed as the first Chef de cité of Sange following its administrative separation (1988)
2	Kashandakwa Kashere	Succeeded Zakabemba; period not precisely documented.
3	Mulinda Mashope	Served as Chef de cité during a transitional phase of local administration
4	Butuku	–
5	Jeannot Buhendwa	Known for maintaining local stability and community organization
6	Kabaka Rusesema	First term in office; details of tenure not precisely known
7	Mwenzani Katulo	Served between Rusesema's two terms
8	Kabaka Rusesema (second term)	Reappointed following Katulo's tenure
9	Masubuko Burubwa	–
10	Ndabwirwa Malula	–

==== Commune status ====
On 9 June 2013, the provincial governor submitted a proposal to the Provincial Assembly requesting the elevation of several agglomerations to the rank of ville (city) and commune (municipality). The Assembly approved the proposal through Decision No. 09/200/PLENIERE/ASPRO/SK of 7 October 2009. Implementation proceeded through Decree No. 012/14 of 18 February 2012 and was consolidated in Decree No. 13/029 of 13 June 2013, which, in its Article 1, elevated Sange, Kiliba, and Luvungi, together with Bulambika, Fizi, Hombo-Sud, Kavumu, Kamanyola, Lulimba-Misisi, Lulingu, Minembwe, Minova, Nyangezi, Nyabibwe, and Swima, to the status of commune. In July 2015, however, the Council of Ministers suspended the enforcement of these decrees. On 27 December 2018, an appendix to the electoral law was passed which listed Sange, Kiliba, and Luvungi as communes of Uvira Territory. In 2024, Sange was described as being administratively divided into nine quartiers (quarters): Kahungwe, Kajembo, Kibogoye, Kinanira, Kyanyanda, Musenyi, Nyakabere 1, Nyakabere 2, and Rutanga.

== 2010 fuel tank explosion ==
On 2 July 2010, Sange experienced a tragedy that resulted in 235 fatalities and 198 injuries due to a tanker truck explosion. The tank truck, carrying 59,000 liters of gasoline from Tanzania, overturned on a narrow and dangerous road that crossed the center of Sange, 60 miles south of the city of Bukavu. The fire quickly spread from the truck, causing devastation. Some people died while attempting to collect leaking fuel, while most of the deaths occurred among those who were indoors watching the FIFA World Cup match. Additionally, some individuals were caught in the fire while trying to flee and were reduced to ashes. The fire also spread to approximately 20 houses, which were primarily made of mud and covered with straw or sheet metal, resulting in their destruction.

== Demographics ==
Around 1940, the first Catholic school in the region was established in Rutanga. Sange hosts seven primary schools and four secondary schools. In the 1930s, a health post was founded in Rutanga, which later evolved into the Centre de santé de Sange. Sange has three health centers and one health post located in Nyakabere.

== Economy ==
The economy is primarily based on agriculture, which constitutes the main source of livelihood for the majority of residents. The principal subsistence crops include cassava, banana, peanut, and maize, which are cultivated across the fertile lowlands of the region. Alongside crop production, livestock breeding ranks as the second most important activity, with families raising cattle and goats for household consumption and to earn income.

Complementing these two sectors is a traditional blacksmithing craft, which historically played a key role in the local economy. Using the Matare stone, local artisans forged various agricultural and domestic implements such as hoes, spears, and knives. When Belgian colonizers introduced cotton and coffee cultivation in the 1950s, Sange became more connected to regional trade circuits. At present, the local economy continues to rely heavily on farming, livestock raising, and small-scale trading.
