= Kamanyola =

Grouping in Ngweshe Chiefdom, Walungu Territory

- Grouping
- Groupement de Kamanyola
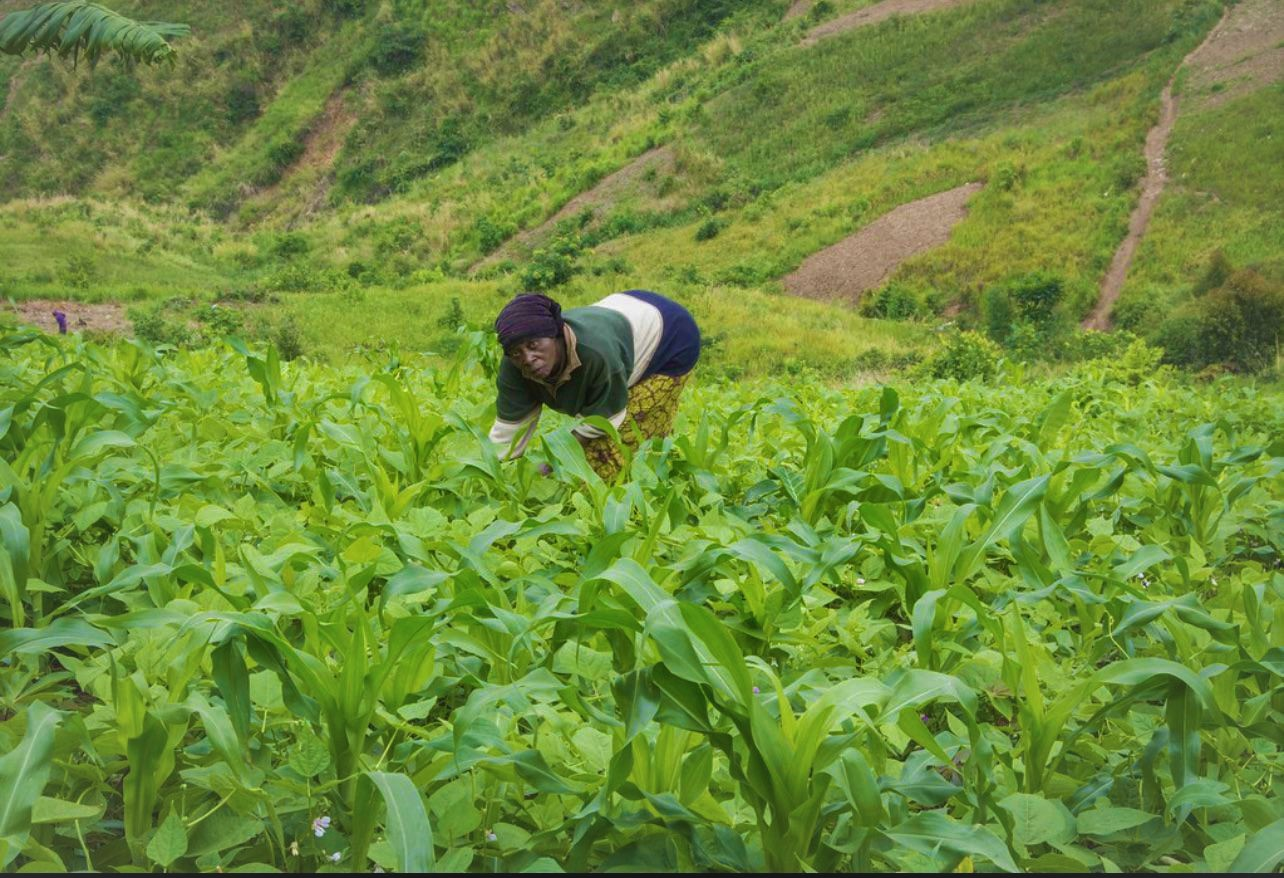
- A farmer harvesting food crops in Kamanyola in the Ruzizi Plain

- Location within Democratic Republic of the Congo
- Country: Democratic Republic of the Congo
- Province: South Kivu
- Territory: Walungu
- Chiefdom: Ngweshe

Population (2011)
  - Total: 56,040
  - Density: 208/km^{2} (540/sq mi)
- Time zone: UTC+2 (CAT)

Kamanyola is one of the groupements (groupings) within the Ngweshe Chiefdom of the Walungu Territory. It is located in the Ruzizi Plain in the South Kivu Province of the Democratic Republic of the Congo, sharing a border with Rwanda and Burundi. Kamanyola stands at a height of 901 meters and is closely situated to the suburb of Mwaro and the village of Mubombo.

Geographically, the region is surrounded by various natural features: to the north-east lies the Ruzizi River, which separates it from the prefecture of Cyangugu in Rwanda; to the northwest are the Mitumba Mountains; to the south is the Luvinvi River, which acts as a boundary with the Itara-Luvungi groupement in the Bafuliiru Chiefdom; and to the southeast, the Ruzizi River separates it from the commune of Rugombo in the Cibitoki Province of northwestern Burundi.

== Geography ==
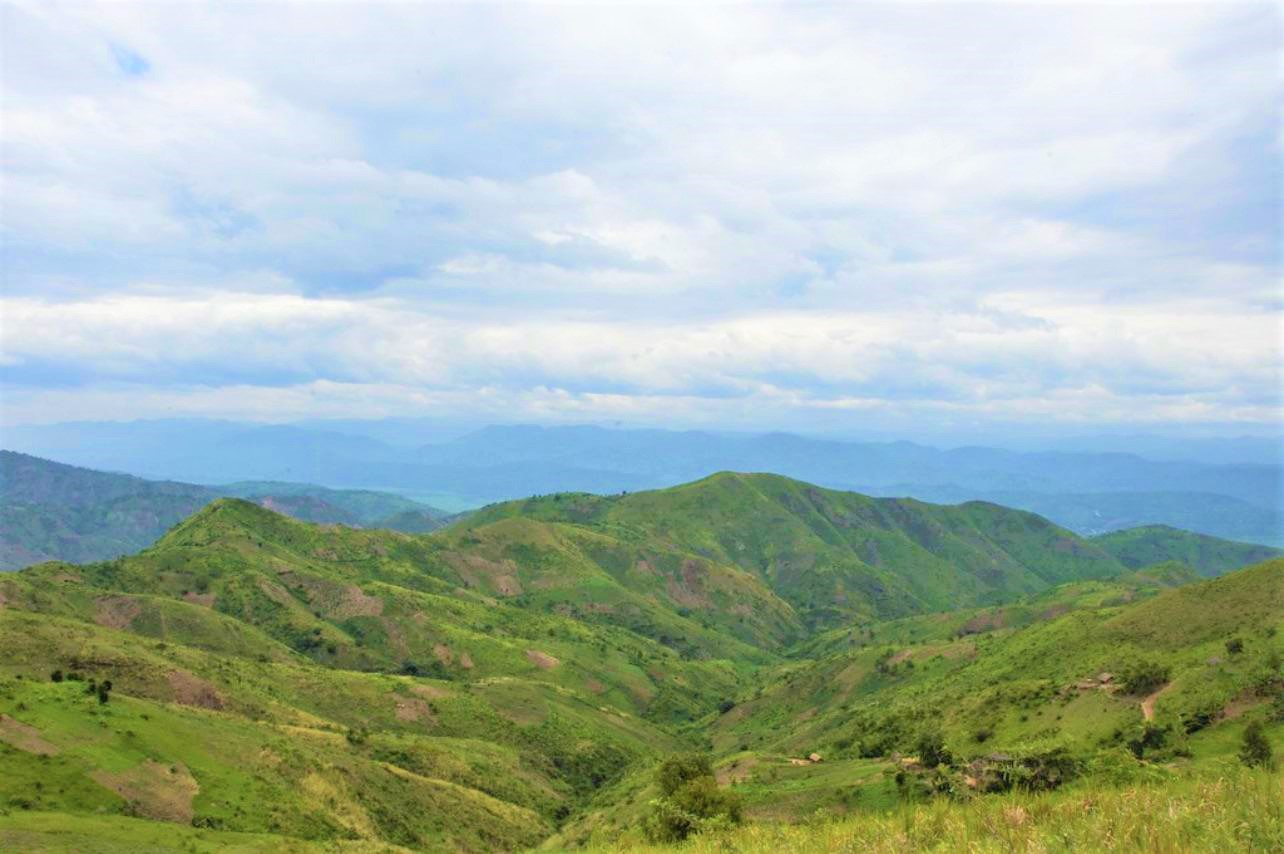
Kamanyola high plateau in the Ruzizi Plain

Kamanyola covers an area of 7.8 km^{2}. Strategically situated at the junction of two significant roadways — National Road 5 (RN5; DRC) and the NR11 (Rwanda) — Kamanyola is both a point of transit and a destination for populations moving between the DRC, Rwanda, and Burundi. RN5 runs along the borders with Rwanda and Burundi, linking Kamanyola to Uvira in the south and Bukavu in the north. The RN11 facilitates cross-border connectivity, directly linking Kamanyola to Rwanda's Kamembe in Cyangugu through the Point of Entry (PoE) at Kamanyola and extending to Cibitoke Province in Burundi. Kamanyola experiences a semi-arid climate characterized by two main seasons. The dry season spans from the beginning of June to August, while the rainy season sees irregular rainfall, with precipitation levels ranging between 800 and 1000 mm per year and temperatures varying between 15 °C and 28 °C.

The vegetation in Kamanyola is predominantly grassy savannah and wooded savannah, but it has suffered from numerous detrimental anthropogenic activities such as excessive afforestation and bushfires. The soil composition varies across different areas: along the river, there is a recent alluvial type; in depressions and along the river, a clay-sandy type; on hillsides, a gravelly type composed of pebbles; and on uplands and slopes, a red sandy-clay type.

Hydrographically, the Ruzizi River dominates the region, but Kamanyola also boasts several other watercourses, including the Ruvubu River in the south, originating from the high mountains of Dazibao and merging into the Ruzizi River, which itself originates from Lake Kivu and flows into Lake Tanganyika. Additionally, there are seasonal streams that only flow during the rainy season, exemplified by Nyamurabamurbha.

=== Administrative division ===
Kamanyola groupement is subdivided into 14 villages (localités), with prominent ones including Kaboya, Kayange, Kashenyi, Rubumba, Kambara, and Irhohero. The groupement is administered by a customary chief (chef de groupement) who collaborates with village chiefs within their respective jurisdictions. The head of the groupement plays a vital role in supporting the chief of the Ngweshe Chiefdom.

== History ==
=== Pre-colonial, epoch of independence, and 1972 migration ===
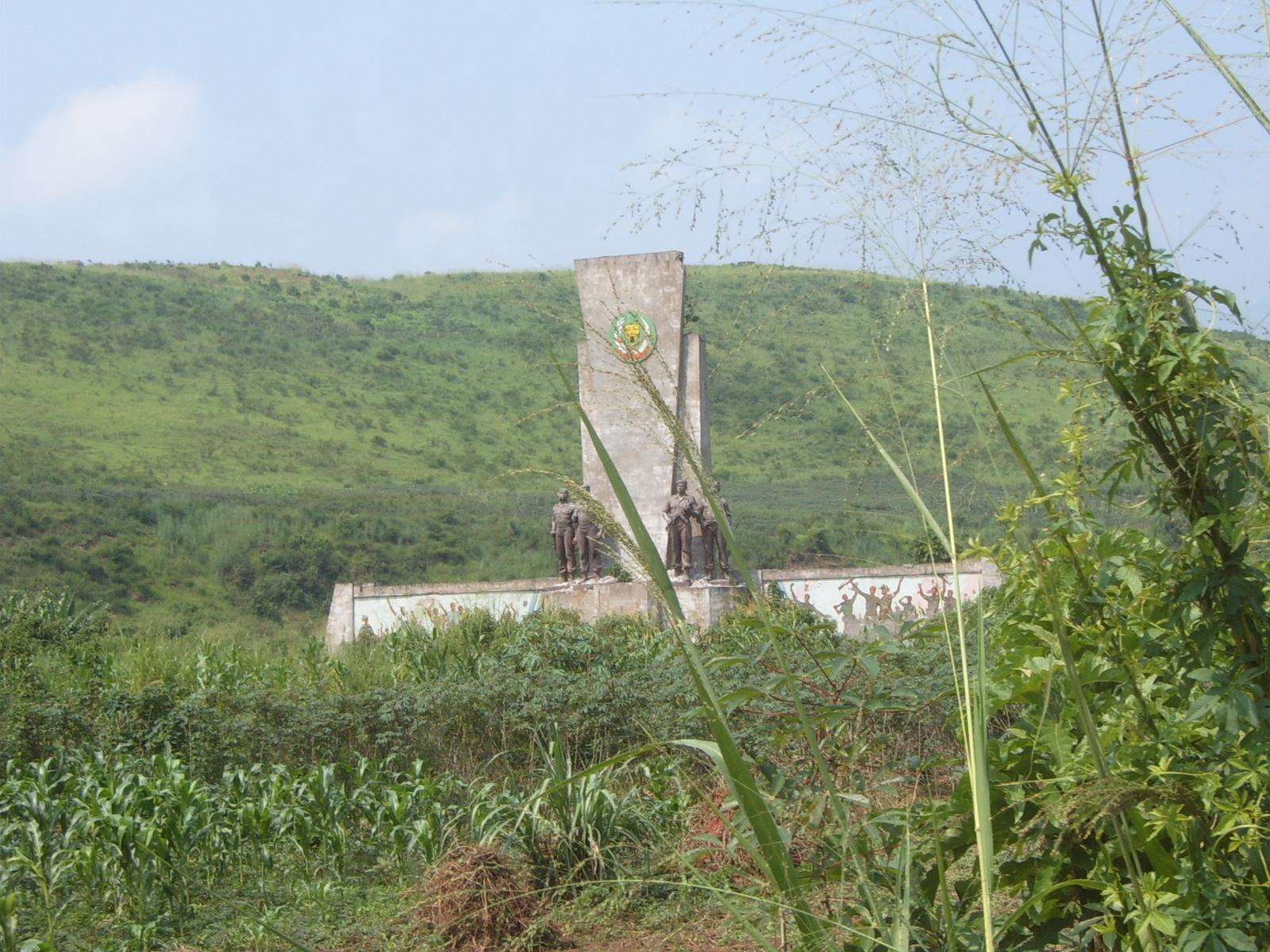
Monument commemorating the victory of the Armée Nationale Congolaise (ANC), led by General Mobutu Sese Seko, in the Battle of Kamanyola.

Kamanyola has traditionally been inhabited by the Bashi people. The region was a border town and historic lieu where the Armée Nationale Congolaise (ANC) landed a key victory against the Mulelist insurgency in 1964.

In 1972, the region experienced a large-scale migration from Burundi during the Great Calamity, a campaign of mass killings perpetrated against the Hutu population by the Tutsi-dominated military and government under Michel Micombero's regime. It is estimated that approximately 50,000 Burundian refugees fled to Zaire, of which 50 percent were of Zairean descent. Notably, not all refugees were Hutu; an estimated 20,000 to 25,000 were of Zairean lineage, primarily from Hemba people, who historically occupied areas on both sides of Lake Tanganyika. In response, Zairean authorities implemented an extensive development program known as "Kusaidia", which extended from Kamanyola and reached as far as Kalemie, spanning approximately 250 kilometers along the shores of Lake Tanganyika. The Bahemba, seeking asylum from the Burundian conflict that erupted in April 1972, leveraged their ethnic solidarity to mitigate the complexities of displacement. The Zairean government made significant efforts to integrate the Hutu refugees into the Kusaidia initiative, which was supported by Mobutu Sese Seko's regime, in collaboration with international organizations, including Catholic Relief Services (CRS), the United States Agency for International Development (USAID), and OXFAM.

=== Massacres of Hutu refugees ===
During the Rwandan Genocide, which displaced millions of Hutu civilians and provoked retaliatory carnage, Kamanyola housed many surviving Hutu refugees as well as ex-FAR/Interahamwe elements and Burundian CNDD-FDD rebels who fled to Walungu Territory in the eastern part of Zaire, fleeing RPA (Rwandan Patriotic Army)

The High Commissioner for Refugees (UNHCR) estimated the number of refugees at 307,499 people, divided between 26 camps: Kamanyola, Izirangabo, Karabangira, Nyangezi, Nyantende, Muku and Mushweshwe south of Bukavu, Bideka, Chimanga (Burhale), Bulonge (a camp not recognized by UNHCR), Nyamirangwe and Chabarhabe to the west of the city, Panzi, Nyakavogo, Mudaka/Murhala, National Institute of Agronomic Studies and Research (INERA), ADI-Kivu [Action pour le Integrated Development in Kivu], Kashusha, Katana, Kalehe, Kabira, north of Bukavu and Chondo, Chayo, Bugarula, Maugwere and Karama on the island of Idjwi. In October 1996, AFDL/APR units from Bwegera and the Rwandan town of Bugarama attacked the Kamanyola refugee camp, in Walungu territory, killing an unknown number of Zairian refugees and civilians. The soldiers then threw the bodies of the victims into the latrines of camp.

Apart from Walungu and Kabare, lethal abuses against refugees continued in other areas of South Kivu. The DRC Mapping Exercise Report published in August 2010 nevertheless points out that refugee camps located along the border with Rwanda and Burundi have been used as rear bases and military training camps.

=== 2017 incident ===
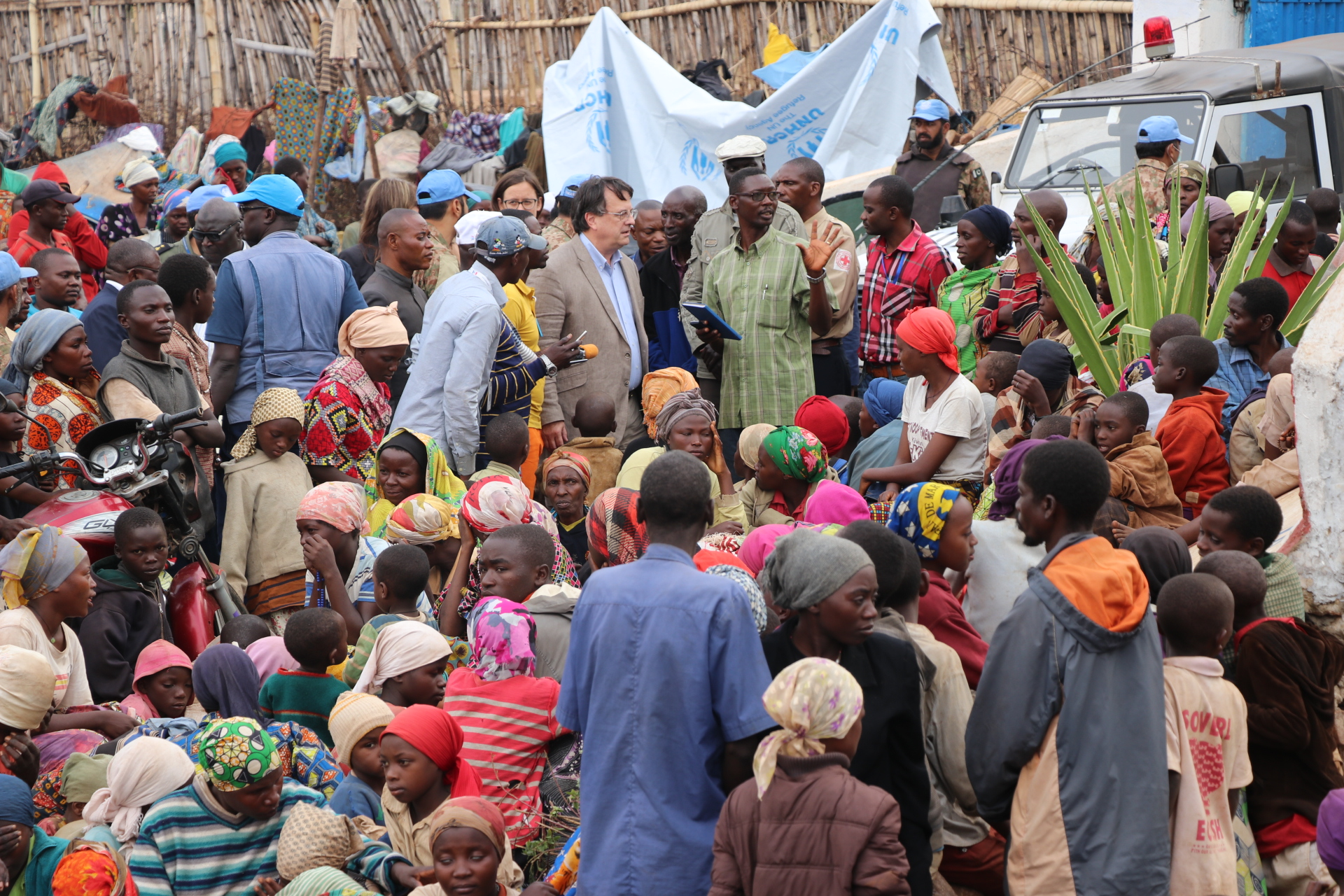
The Deputy head of MONUSCO, David Gressly, visited Kamanyola to inquire about the situation and express compassion, September 2017

On 15 September 2017, 38 Burundians were killed, and a hundred others were injured as a result of clashes with FARDC in Kamanyola in the Walungu Territory, South Kivu. Most of these Burundians left Burundi to take refuge in eastern DRC after the 12 March 2013 incidents in Businde, in the Kayanza Province (North), where clashes between the Burundian national police and the faithful of Eusebie Ngendakumana, left six dead and 40 injured. Ngendakumana managed to cross the border into the eastern part of the DRC with her supporters. On 12 and 13 September 2017, four Burundians were detained by the police and brought to the National Intelligence Agency (Agence Nationale de Renseignements; ANR) for conducting such night patrols bearing clubs. Fearing these four would be forcefully repatriated, fellow Burundians marched in front of the Congolese ANR's office in Kamanyola, demanding the release of four Burundian detainees. According to Justin Bitakwira, former government Minister and member of the National Assembly, these were not Burundian refugees or asylum seekers, but a group armed with weapons of war who fought with a Congolese army patrol.

Bitakwira stated:

"There is no refugee camp in Kamanyola. It was found that for a while, some of these people allowed themselves to patrol at night with edged weapons. We caught four of them and wanted to transfer them to Uvira so that they could go home. Women, children and old people came to attack the intelligence office to destroy it....... The FARDC came to the rescue and they shot our commander again. You can imagine the reaction of a soldier who finds himself in front of a civilian who has already snatched weapons! In self-defense as it was night, they started shooting".

The security services suspected them of making bladed weapons in their residence. They also alleged that an AK-47 rifle was found among the Burundian demonstrators who shot and killed five Congolese soldiers and injured others. The rally deteriorated and resulted in an affront, first with the throwing of stones at the police, then with guns after the intervention of the FARDC. As a result, Congolese security forces repeatedly shot at nearly 2,000 asylum seekers who were demonstrating, killing 38 and wounding others.

== Culture ==
=== Religion ===
Christianity was introduced to Kamanyola with the arrival of the White Fathers, also known as the Missionaries of Africa, who initially settled in Luvungi before establishing themselves in Kamanyola. Today, Catholicism and Protestantism dominate the religious landscape, with the majority of the population adhering to these denominations. Among the most prominent churches are the Assemblée Chrétienne de Kamanyola, the Église Garenganze Kamanyola, and the Paroisse Mather Ecclésia de Kamanyola. An Orthodox church has also been established in recent years, marking its presence for less than five years. The religious diversity of Kamanyola is further exemplified by a Muslim mosque serving the local Islamic community.

=== Sports ===
Association football is the most popular sport, and the Paroisse Mather Ecclésia takes an active role in organizing youth football tournaments, especially during the dry season. These events are often held on the Mulengezi field, with the finals taking place at the Nyakavogo stadium in Bukavu's Bagira commune. While amateur clubs for karate, boxing, and basketball also exist, the overall development of sports in Kamanyola is hampered by a lack of financial sponsorship, despite the presence of considerable local talent.

== Economy ==
=== Subsistence agriculture ===
Subsistence agriculture is the most significant economic activity in the region, which supports local development efforts, with over 85% of residents relying on it. Often geared towards self-consumption, Kamanyola cultivates a variety of crops, including food crops, forage crops, fiber-producing plants, oilseed crops, ornamental crops, and industrial crops.

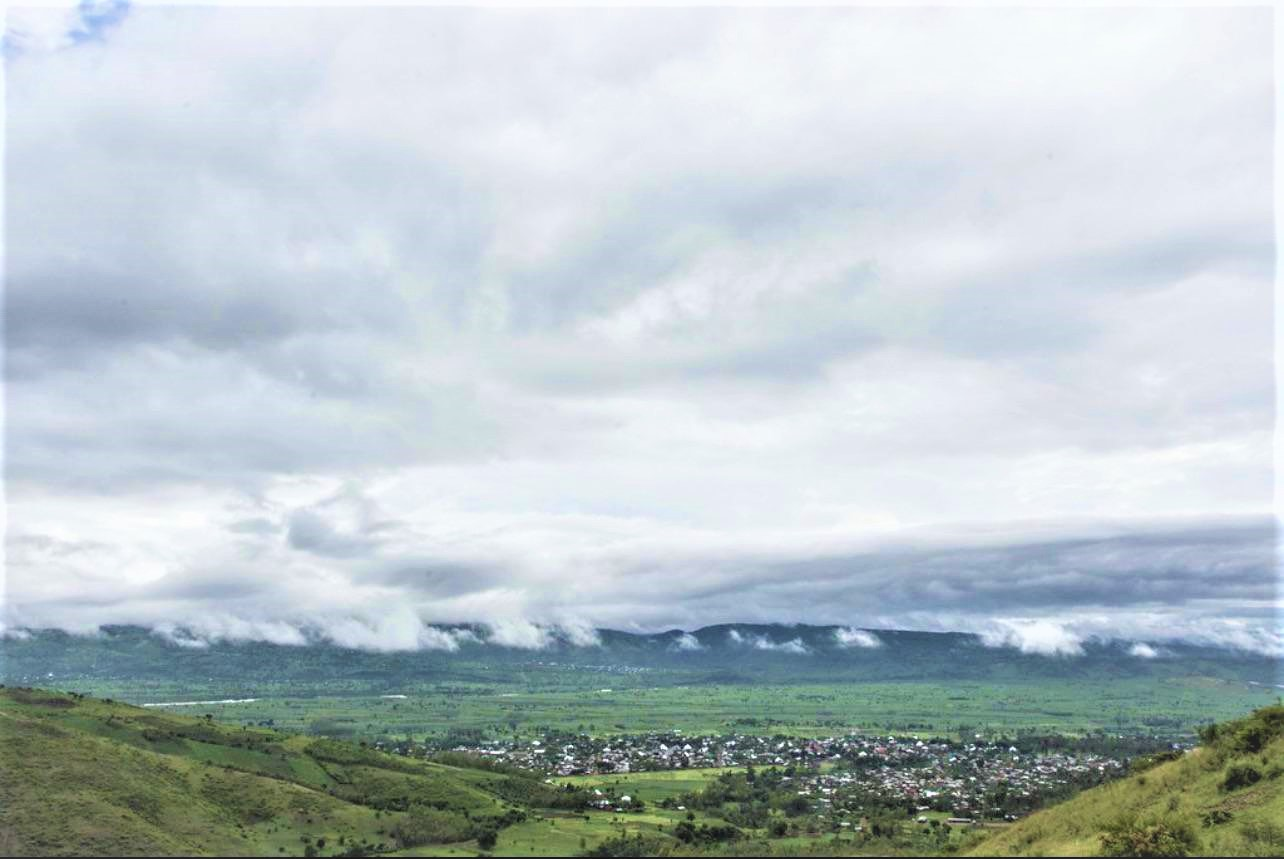
An aerial view of Kamanyola surrounds by extensive hills

Pineapples are among the most prominent agricultural commodities, and they are predominantly exported to Rwanda's Cyangugu prefecture, particularly to Bugarama, Nyakabuye, and Muganza. Cassava also serves as a staple product; however, its market influence diminished between 2004 and 2010 due to the prevalence of mosaic virus, locally referred to as Butuku. Nevertheless, targeted humanitarian interventions led by non-governmental organizations have revitalized cassava production, restoring its market share to approximately 45%, with exports extending to Rwanda, Burundi, and the wider Ruzizi Plain. Bananas constitute a fundamental component of local agriculture, primarily used to produce the traditional fermented beverage kasiksi. These bananas are sourced from the highlands of Uvira Territory, specifically from the Itara-Luvungi groupement. Sugar cane is also a widely consumed commodity, with 75% allocated for export to Rwanda, while the remaining portion is sourced from Sange. Beans are imported into Uvira and Rwanda, whereas soybeans, though a relatively recent introduction to Kamanyola, are utilized as a condiment and exported to various regions in Rwanda and Burundi.

Tomatoes are categorized as an industrial crop in Kamanyola, primarily consumed locally but exported to Bukavu and along the Uvira-Kalemie axis. Corn has gained increasing importance, particularly in light of the reduced cassava production due to the mosaic disease. Other significant agricultural outputs include peas from Uvira, sweet potatoes from Sange, and crops such as sorghum, sunflower, and yam from the Ruzizi Plain. While peanuts and avocados are not prioritized by the population because of their perceived economic insignificance, they remain part of the diet following imports from the Ruzizi Plain and Rwanda. Meanwhile, onions are extensively cultivated due to their economic potential, with production, consumption, and export reaching their peak during the growing season.

=== Pastoral farming and aquaculture ===
Family-based livestock breeding is widespread, although it is hampered by suboptimal feeding regimes and a paucity of veterinary services, which are exacerbated by the absence of structured support mechanisms. Free-stall breeding practices, in which livestock are kept indoors, are common. Cattle and goat herders frequently engage in transhumance, migrating seasonally to access superior grazing grounds; goat farming is particularly prominent, with local varieties being highly regarded. These goats are rarely sold to slaughterhouses, as breeders tend to retain them for further breeding purposes, though some are traded in markets across Rwanda, Burundi, and the Ruzizi Plain. Pig farming is also practiced, primarily for meat consumption, with a preference for locally bred pigs, leading to a strong market demand for pork. Beyond goats and pigs, other livestock, such as chickens, turkeys, rabbits, and guinea pigs, are commonly raised and traded in local markets for either consumption or breeding purposes.

Fish farming is among Kamanyola's income-generating activities. It is practiced near the Ruzizi River, in the localities of Ishindiro and Irohero, near the natural border between Rwanda, Burundi, and the Democratic Republic of the Congo. Fish farming takes two primary forms: local production and imports. Locally, fish are farmed through the use of artificial ponds, covering around 30% of the area's consumption needs. However, to meet the overall demand, Kamanyola imports fish from Uvira, Kalemie, and Moba, with these external sources accounting for 70% of total consumption.

== Health facilities ==
Kamanyola is served by both state-run and private health institutions, which have seen improvements in medical services and sanitation due to the financial and material contributions of various humanitarian NGOs. Key healthcare facilities in the area include:

- Saint Joseph Hospital of Kamanyola (Hôpital Saint Joseph de Kamanyola; HSJK)
- Kamanyola Reference Health Center (Centre de Santé de Référence de Kamanyola; CSRK)
- Women's Initiative for Development (Initiative des Femmes pour le Développement; IFD) health center
- Kashenyi Health Center (Centre de Santé de Kashenyi).

Additionally, Red Cross health posts, dispensaries, and pharmacies are dispersed throughout Kamanyola's different localities.

== Transport ==
Kamanyola is a key hub for transportation and cross-border movement in South Kivu, located where the RN5 in the DRC intersects with Rwanda's NR11. It serves as both a transit point and destination for people traveling between the DRC, Rwanda, and Burundi.

=== Main transportation axes ===
Route name	Direction and destination	Estimated daily flow	Purpose	Modes of transport	Ref.
Axe Kamanyola–Uvira (RN5)	South to Uvira and southern South Kivu	~5,000 people	Trade, labor, healthcare, education, family visits	Buses, trucks, cars, motorcycles	
Axe Kamanyola–Bukavu (RN5)	North to Bukavu via Ngomo escarpments	~2,000 people	Trade in salted fish, onions, alcohol, construction materials	Road vehicles, pedestrians	
Axe Kamanyola–Kamembe (NR11)	Cross-border to Kamembe/Bugarama in Rwanda	~1,000 people	Commerce, health, labor, and social interactions through Point of Entry at Kamanyola	Cars, buses, motorcycles, bicycles, pedestrians	

=== Secondary routes ===
Route name	Direction and destination	Estimated daily flow	Purpose	Modes of transport	Ref.
Axe Kamanyola–Kiliba–Cibitoke (Burundi)	Cibitoke (Burundi), via Rubenga	~500 people	Cross-border movement, especially when Rubenga PoE access is limited	Motorcycles, pedestrians	
Axe Kamanyola–Munanira	Munanira	~200 people	Transport of goods (timber, charcoal), access to education, health, family	Motorcycles, bicycles, pedestrians	

=== Border crossings and control points ===
Kamanyola hosts one formal border post — the PoE Kamanyola — where agencies such as the Direction Générale de Migration (DGM, for migration), the Programme National d'Hygiène aux Frontières (PNHF, for public hygiene), and the SQAH (for animal health) oversee the movement of people, animals, and goods. Daily traffic at this PoE is estimated at 3,000 individuals. Additionally, five informal PoEs have been identified, located along the Ruzizi River (the natural border with Burundi), including Rubenga, Luberizi, Kaberagule, Nyamoma, and Kiliba. These points are often used to circumvent official crossings, especially when border controls are perceived as restrictive.
