= Ruzizi Plain =

River valley in eastern Democratic Republic of the Congo

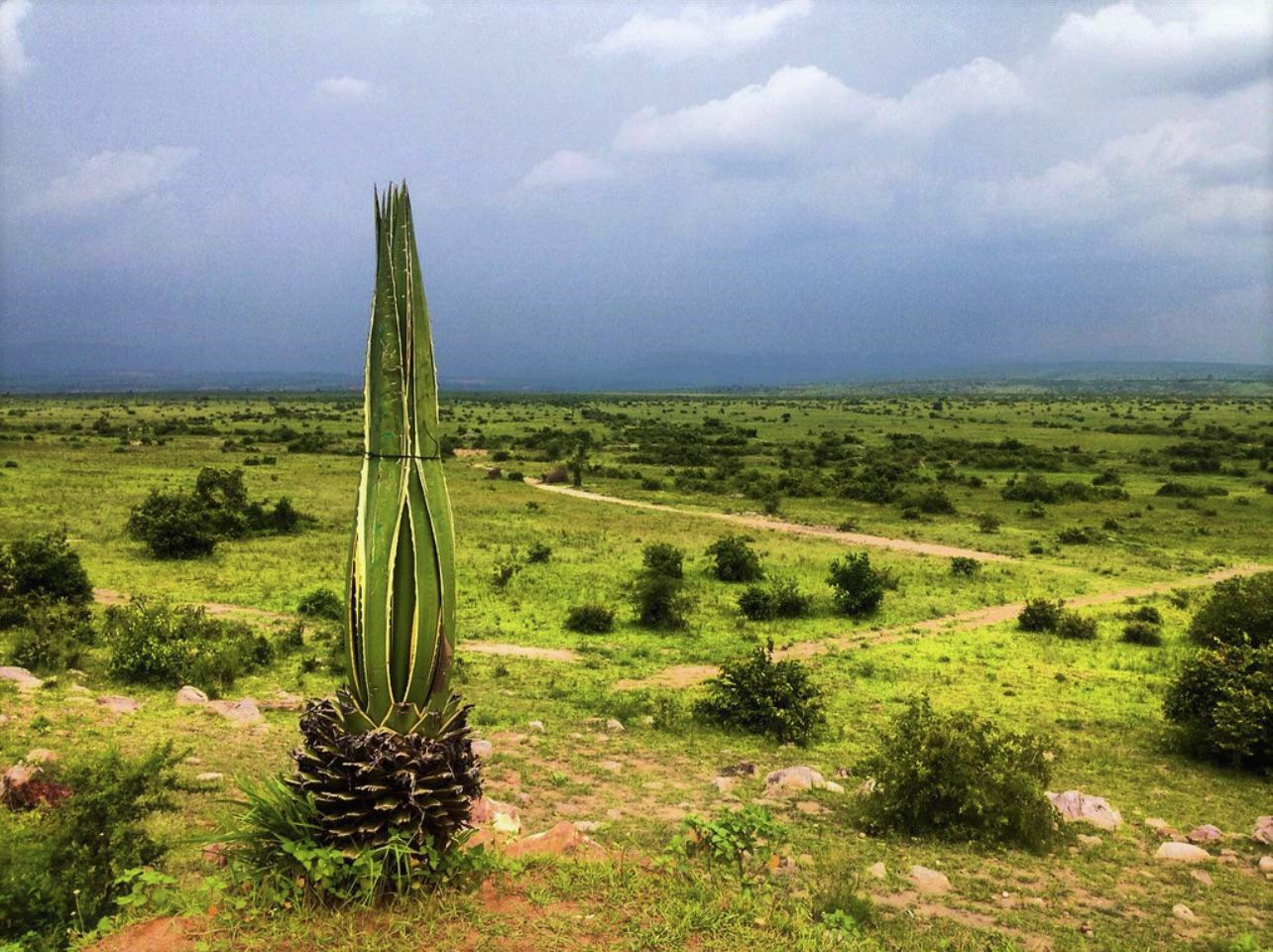
View of grassland in Butaho in the Ruzizi Plain of the Democratic Republic of the Congo.

The Ruzizi Plain (French: Plaine de la Ruzizi, Swahili: Bonde la Ruzizi) is a valley situated between the Mitumba mountain chain and the Ruzizi River. It serves as a natural border, separating the Democratic Republic of the Congo from Burundi and Rwanda on the other side. The Ruzizi Plain is an integral part of the larger Western Rift Valley, which stretches across several African countries. It is traversed by the Ruzizi River, which flows from Lake Kivu through the plain and into Lake Tanganyika. It covers an area of 175,000 hectares divided between Burundi, Rwanda and the DRC. In Burundi, the plain extends to the northern sector of Imbo. It is bounded by parallels 2°36′ and 3°26′ south latitude and by meridians 29°00′ and 29°26 east longitude—an area of 1025 km2. The Congolese side is bounded to the north by the plain of Bugarama (Rwanda), to the east by the plain of Imbo (Burundi), to the West by the chain of Mitumba and to the South by Lake Tanganyika. The region covers thus about 80,000 hectares with 80 kilometers in length.

The Ruzizi Plain, known for its biodiversity, which hosts a wide range of plant and animal species, is home to important protected areas such as the Kahuzi-Biega National Park and the Rugege Forest Reserve, and is inhabited by a diverse composition of ethnic groups, including the Bavira, Bafuliiru, Bashi, Balega, Babembe, Banyindu, Bahavu, (from South Kivu) and Hutu, Tutsi and Batwa from neighboring Burundi and Rwanda. The region is also a major agricultural center, with crops such as coffee, maize, and beans being grown in the area. However, the Ruzizi Plain has also been plagued by conflicts and is often considered the periphery of a vast area of insecurity whose major criminogenic centers are located in the middle and high plateaux of the Uvira Territory and in the Fizi Territory, with the mountain slopes of the Hauts and Moyens Plateaux occupied by regional and foreign armed groups.

== History ==
=== Early history ===
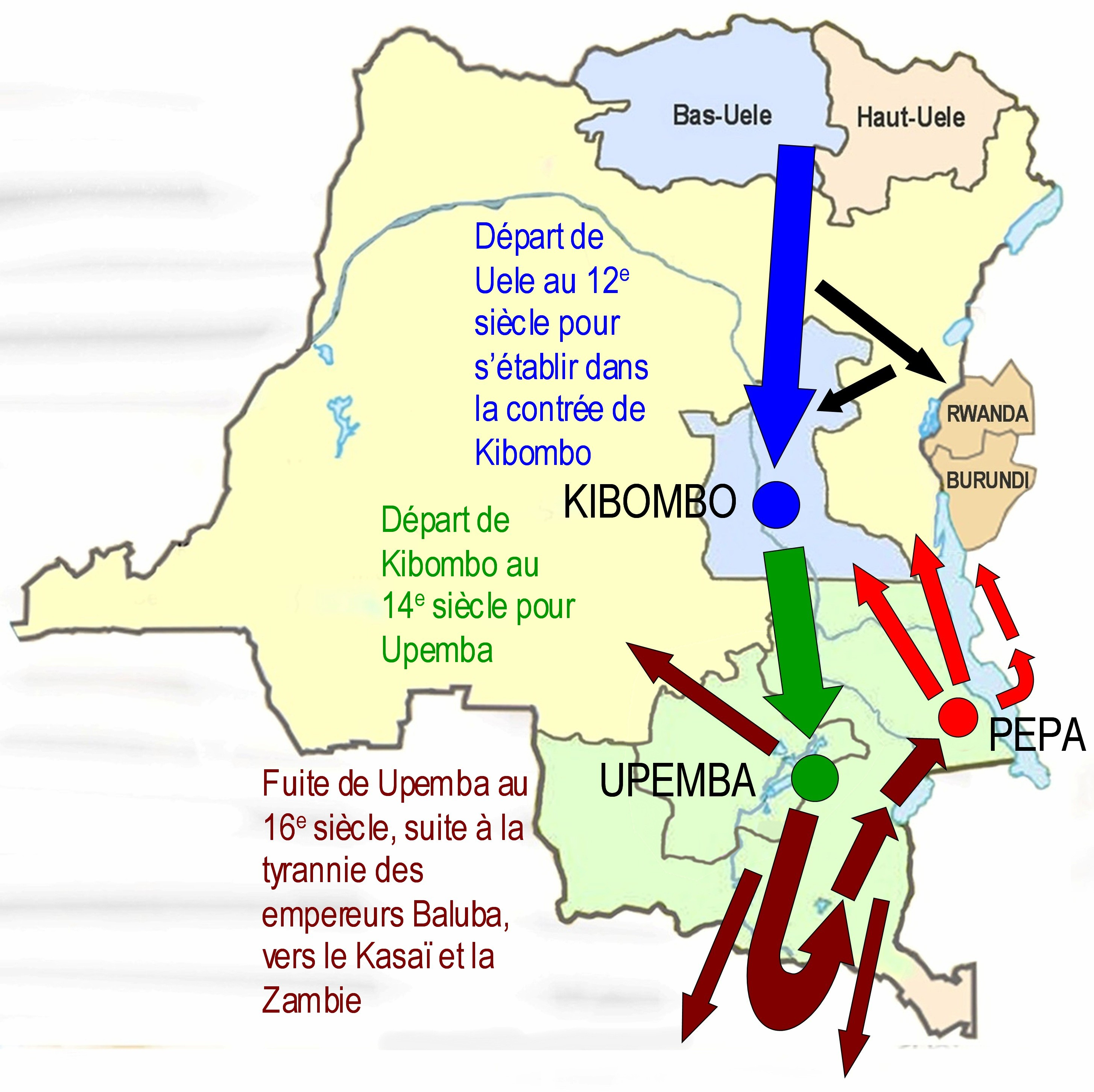
The migratory dispersions undertaken by the Bavira prior to their eventual settlement in the Uvira Territory.

According to Shi historian Bishikwabo Chubaka, the Ruzizi Plain was inhabited by Vira and Fuliiru agriculturalists during their migratory flows from Lwindi (currently part now Luindi Chiefdom) in the 17th century. The Bavira would have been the first to settle in the area of the Lake coming from Lwindi around the Ulindi River in the mountainous hinterland. Kirunga, son of Kiringishe, the chief in Lwindi, arrived on a hunting party in the land of Uvira which was uninhabited. He asked investiture of his father, and received the royal insignia, including the karinga drum. He was accompanied by seven clans, the heads of which were Mugaza, Mufumu, Nabaganda, Muhinga, Nabuhalu, Nalukanga and Mukono.

Following the establishment of Bavira, the Bahamba clan from the Fuliiru people, along with other clans, arrived. Alfred Moeller de Laddersous, a Belgian colonial administrator and governor of Orientale Province who extensively explored the eastern part of the Belgian Congo and fluent in multiple Bantu languages, estimates that the Bahamba (Wahamba) changed their eponym from Wahamba to Bafuliiru. Consequently, Bafuliiru met Bavira at the Kiliba River in combat, after which the Bafuliiru were established north of the Bavira and somewhat in Bavira country itself. They had their own paramount who did not depend on the Bavira paramount.

=== Barundi and Banyarwanda immigration ===
In the early nineteenth century, the Ruzizi Plain welcomed a substantial influx of people coming from Burundi, Rwanda, and Uganda. The Barundi arrived during the first half of the 19th century under chief Kinyoni, a subchief of Burundian King Mwezi IV Gisabo from the Banyakarama Dynasty, who established himself with his adherents on the right bank of the Ruzizi River. The Barundi were absorbed into the Bafuliiru communities and later known as Bazige clan. The Banyarwanda also appeared before European penetration. They left the country under Bugumba to get rid of the immoderation of King Kahindiro. They established themselves in Vira and the Fuliiru territories of Mulenge and Upper Sange. At the death of their second chief Kaila, they dispersed all over the country to settle in the most inaccessible areas.

During the colonial period, Belgian colonial authorities encouraged migration of Banyarwanda into parts of Eastern Congo from the recently acquired mandate of Ruanda-Urundi through the Mission d'Immigration des Banyaruanda (lit. 'Mission for Banyarwanda immigration'; MIB)". Rwanda had a high population density and suffered a number of major famines throughout the interwar years. As well as mitigating this situation, white farmers hoped to use Banyarwanda as labour in regions of Eastern Congo which were sparsely populated. The "transplanted people" were established in three main sites in Eastern Congo, namely Masisi and the Itombwe plateau in Kivu as well as the Vyura Mountains in eastern Katanga.

Another inflow of Banyarwanda immigrants migrated to the eastern part of the Belgian Congo at the end of the 1950s and 1960s, during the Rwandan Revolution, which abolished the monarchy and established a majority Hutu-run government. As a result, thousands of Tutsis who were members of the repressive regime, including their Umwami (King), fled to neighboring countries of Uganda, Congo, and Tanzania. While the Tutsis of Itombwe (the old ones, who came in small numbers before colonization, and the transplanted ones) distinguished themselves, from the 1970s onwards, from those coming forthwith from Rwanda under the pseudonym "Banyamulenge" (literally 'those who live in Mulenge', the name of the peaks of Mulenge, where the Mwami of the Fuliiru had settled their predecessors), those of Katanga were called "BanyaVyura", also named after the heights on which the Belgians and the customary chiefs of Moba had allowed them to settle.

In 1960, the Belgo-Congolese Round Table recognized that all members of these populations of Rwandan origin had the opportunity to renounce their Rwandan citizenship and become Congolese citizens.

=== Ethnic tensions ===
The first ethnic tensions: Inter-ethnic tensions and cases of violence were reported as early as the first half of the 20th century after the Uvira Territory was divided by the settlers into three chiefdoms (according to ethnicity): the Bavira Chiefdoms, Bafuliiru and Barundi (which is still the chiefdom of the Plain today). The Bafuliru revolted in 1929 against the decision to grant the chiefdom of the Plain to the Barundi and tried to force the Barundi to flee to Burundi on several occasions. A second wave of violence occurred during the Congo Crisis (1960-1965) after the Barundi and Banyamulenge supported Mobutu Sese Seko, in contrast to other communities. Tensions between Barundi/Banyamulenge and Bafuliru at the time intensified. While the authorities in Kinshasa were taking the question of their citizenship into their own hands, their status as foreigners was strengthened in the eyes of other local communities.

Inter-ethnic groups and raised suspicions against groups whose Congolese nationality was deemed questionable. The Burundian and Rwandan communities that were not invited to the Conference were also excluded from the census of nationals ahead of the elections. Faced with unemployment and discrimination, many young people from Rwandan communities left Uganda in 1990 to join the Rwandan Patriotic Front (RPF) movement. Their departure reinforced the perception that they were outsiders. The situation seriously deteriorated in 1994 following the Rwandan Genocide when the entry of the RPF into Rwanda led to an exodus of Interahamwe (genocidaires) and nearly two million Rwandan Hutu refugees to the DRC. Some communities, accused of having collaborated with the Tutsi, were targeted by the Hutu. Conversely, the Congolese Hutu, assimilated to those responsible for the genocide, suffered reprisals from the Tutsi. In 1995, the Transitional Parliament then adopted a resolution demanding the expulsion of all Rwandan and Burundian refugees and immigrants.

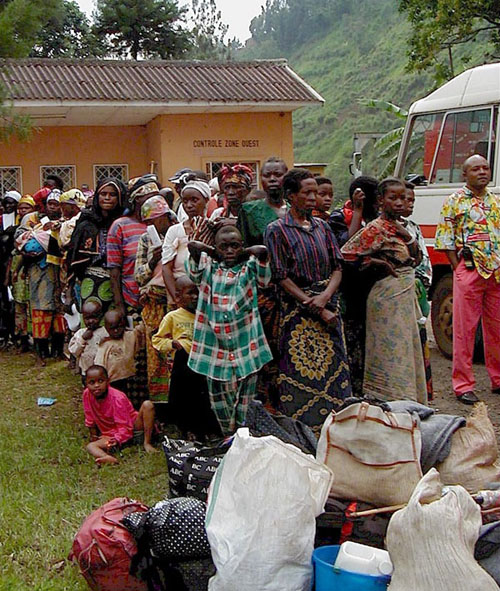
Rape has been used as a weapon of war in both the First Congo War and Second Congo War.

During the First Congo War, after Mobutu provided refuge for Hutu refugees and Interahamwe, the Rwanda and Uganda armies invaded Zaire in 1996. The Alliance of Democratic Forces for the Liberation of Congo (AFDL), led by Laurent Désiré Kabila and supported by the Rwandans and the Ugandans, brutally dismantled the refugee camps and ousted Mobutu from power. At that time, the Banyamulenge occupied positions of authority in the administrative province of South Kivu and the territory of Uvira, causing considerable discontent among other communities, including Bwegera, Luberizi, Luvungi, Katala, Rubenga, Lubarika, Kakumbukumbu, Mutarule, Kagunga, Kiliba, Ndunda, Biriba, Sange, Rwenena, Kahororo, Kamanyola, Lemera, Makobola, Kasika, Kilungutwe, Kilungutwe River, Katogota, and in other areas of South and North Kivu.

During the Second Congo War, the alliance with Rwanda and Uganda ended in 1998 when Laurent Désiré Kabila attempted to gain independence from his associates and excluded Tutsis from his government. As Rwanda and Uganda armies invaded the DRC for the second time, the Congolese Tutsi community (Banyamulenge, Barundi and Banyarwanda) allied with the rebellion of the Rassemblement Congolais pour la Democratie (RCD), which controlled eastern DRC with the aim of obtaining citizenship and the right to political representation. Many armed groups, Maï Maï, which enjoyed broad support from the communities’ “natives” and the government of Kinshasa, organized themselves as the opponents of the RCD. The civilian population has been directly targeted by acts of violence, resulting in heightened feelings of hatred and insecurity.

=== The transitional period (1998–2003) ===
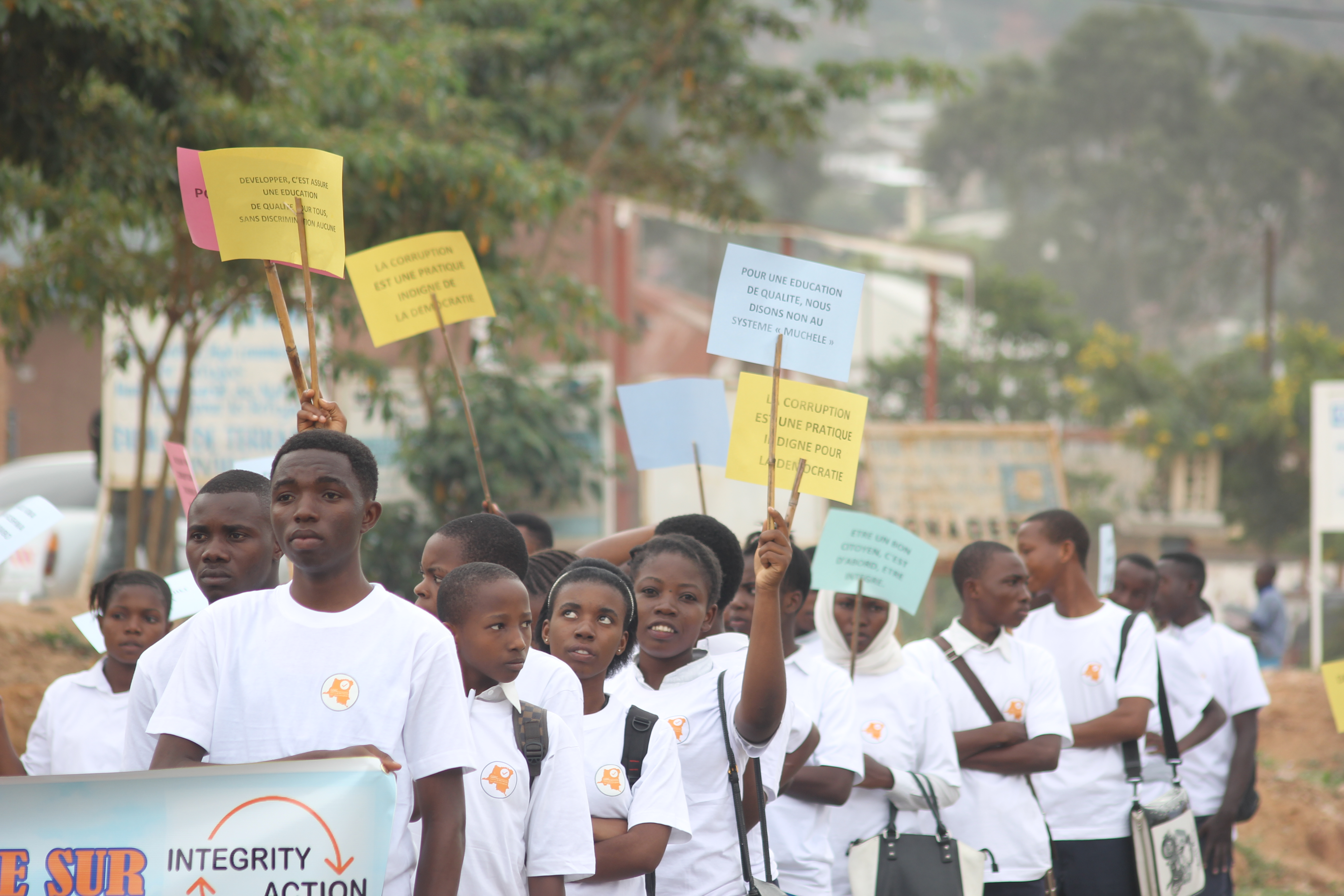
Students in Uvira marching under the slogan of “United Against Corruption for Development, Peace and Security”.

While the RCD was part of the transitional government following the Pretoria Peace Accord, its members failed to secure seats in the first elections in 2006. The RCD remained without representation in provincial and national politics. Consequently, those dissatisfied with the integration process formed the CNDP (National Congress for the Defense of the People) movement, later re-established as M23 (the March 23 Movement) to maintain influence in Kinshasa and protect their economic and security interests in the East. In November 2013, the FARDC (Forces Armées de la République Démocratique du Congo), assisted by the Rapid Intervention Brigade of the United Nations Organization Stabilization Mission in the Democratic Republic of the Congo (MONUSCO), put an end to these rebellions. These movements, which were mainly supported by Tutsi communities, reinforced feelings of hatred against these communities.

=== Current inter-community tensions ===
Inter-community tensions between the two main communities of the Ruzizi Plain, the Bafuliru and the Barundi (the Banyamulenge being often assimilated to the Barundi), are still very strong. The conflicts to access power (especially customary power) and land are the most significant conflicts. The land conflict, also related to inter-community tensions, is expressed mainly through the conflict between farmers and herders (due to the wandering of animals). The conflict is particularly acute between Barundi and Banyamulenge herders, in search of pasture for their cattle, and Bafuliru farmers whose fields are regularly devastated by cows. Despite the waves of violence in the area and growing mistrust among communities, dialogue, based on a non-violent approach, remains the most frequently used conflict resolution mechanism.

== Geography ==
=== Climate ===
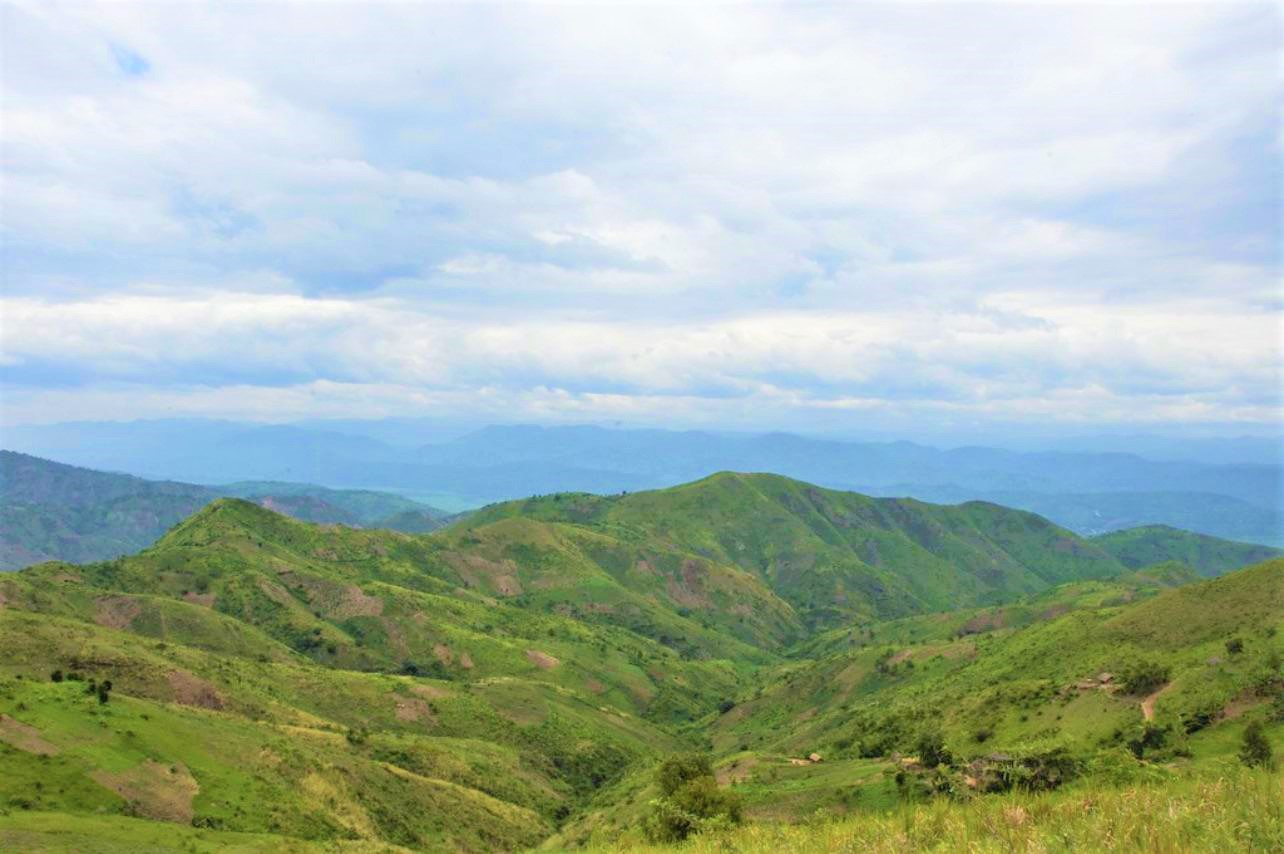
An aerial view showing hills encircling Kamanyola in the Ruzizi Plain.

The Ruzizi Plain is characterized by a type of Aw4 tropical climate according to the Köppen Vladimir climatic classification, a bimodal rainfall regime of 600 to 900 mm and 18 to 32 °C. The maximum temperatures varied from 30.4 to 32.2◦C while the minimum temperatures ranged from 15.2 to 19.4◦C, with high daily variations (14◦C). The long rainy season commences in October and ends in February, while the short rainy season starts in February and ends in June. The short rainy season is followed by a four-month dry season (June to September).

=== Vegetation ===
The vegetation of the Ruzizi Plain is dominated by grassy savannahs, consisting of grassland of medium density. Savannas alternate with a shrub and a thorny steppe. The gallery forest emerges throughout the Ruzizi Plain.

=== Hydrology ===
The Ruzizi Plain consists of clay-sandy soils: the soil type encircles the entire parts of Kiliba at Gatumba to Lake Tanganyika, and the sandy-clayey soils: cover the rest of the Plain. The overall soil density varies from 1.28 to 1.65 g/cm3. The region is related to the tectonic movements that shaped the terrestrial forms of East Africa. Soils are of vertisols and arenosols types associated with solonchaks with silty to sandy related texture. Most of these are of alluvial origin. The alluvium was brought to the Ruzizi Plain through the Ruzizi River and streams from the high mountains of the Nile Congo Watershed and the Mitumba mountains. Besides, extreme rainfall are associated with soil erosion and declined soil fertility. Consequently, planning the rainfed agriculture has become complex as irrigation facilities and appropriate water conservation practices are lacking. This discourages farmers from investing in sustainable, productive, and economically promising practices, since farming outcomes are unpredictable.

== Agriculture ==
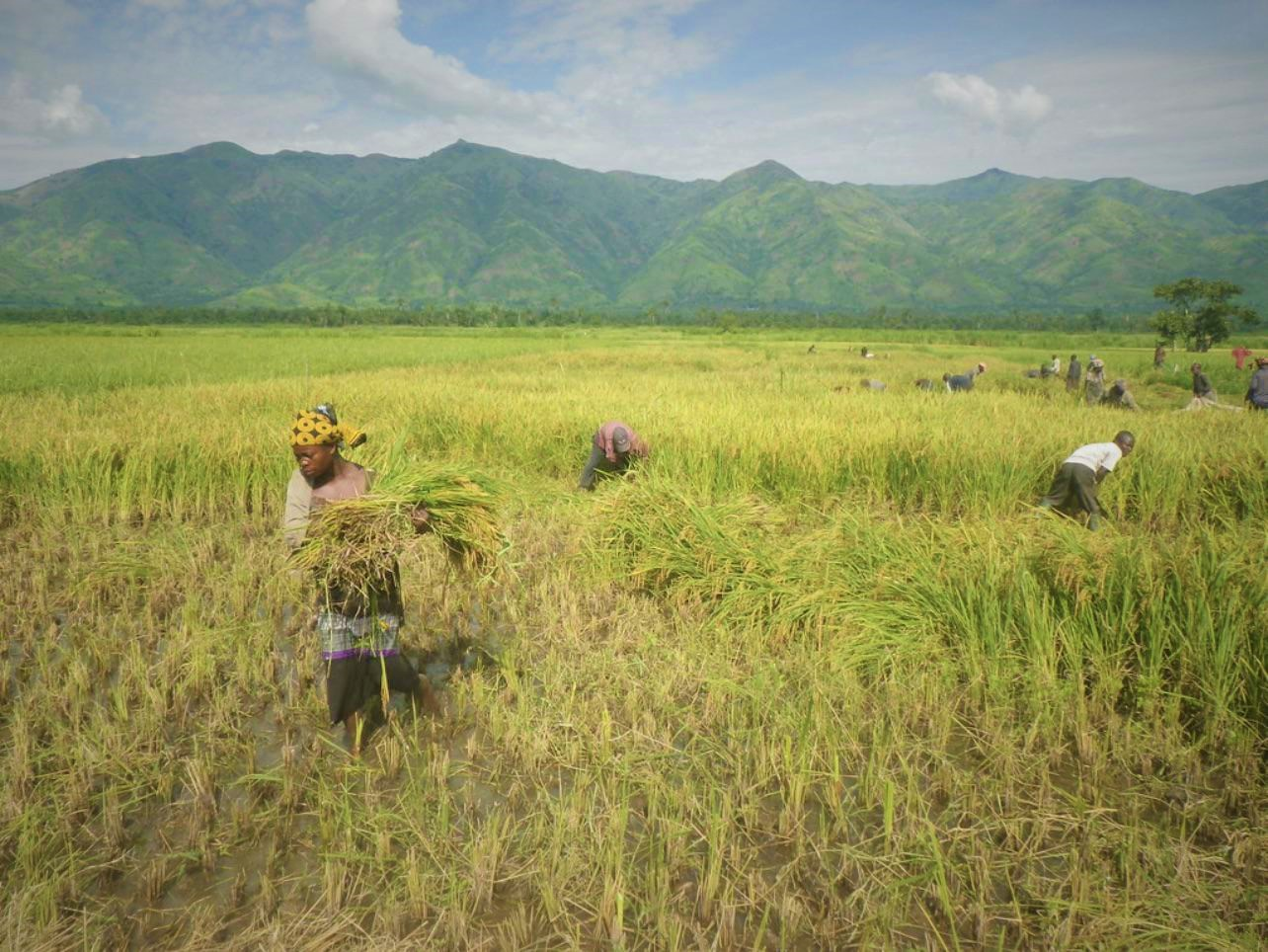
Rice cultivation In the Ruzizi Plain

Agriculture and livestock farming are the main economic activities of the population. Of the 80,000 ha that constitutes the Ruzizi Plain, 14,000 ha are occupied by approximately 45,000 farmers whose main activity is agriculture, and the remainder is covered with pastures (35,000 ha) and marshes (30,000 ha). Rice, maize, cassava, groundnuts, beans, soybeans, tomatoes and vegetables are the main crops in the area. Poorly educated people commonly practice family farming. Monoculture is dominant, especially for cereals (maize, rice, sugarcane); while grain and legumes are mainly intercropped with tuber crops (cassava-groundnut, cassava-soybean) and cereals (maize, sorghum).

== See also ==
- Uvira Territory
- Uvira
- Luvungi
- Sange
- Lemera
- Mulenge
- Luberizi
- Mutarule
- Kiliba
- Katogota
