= Luvungi =

Groupement in South Kivu, DR Congo

Coordinates: 2.86°S 29.03°E

- Grouping
- Groupement d'Itara-Luvungi
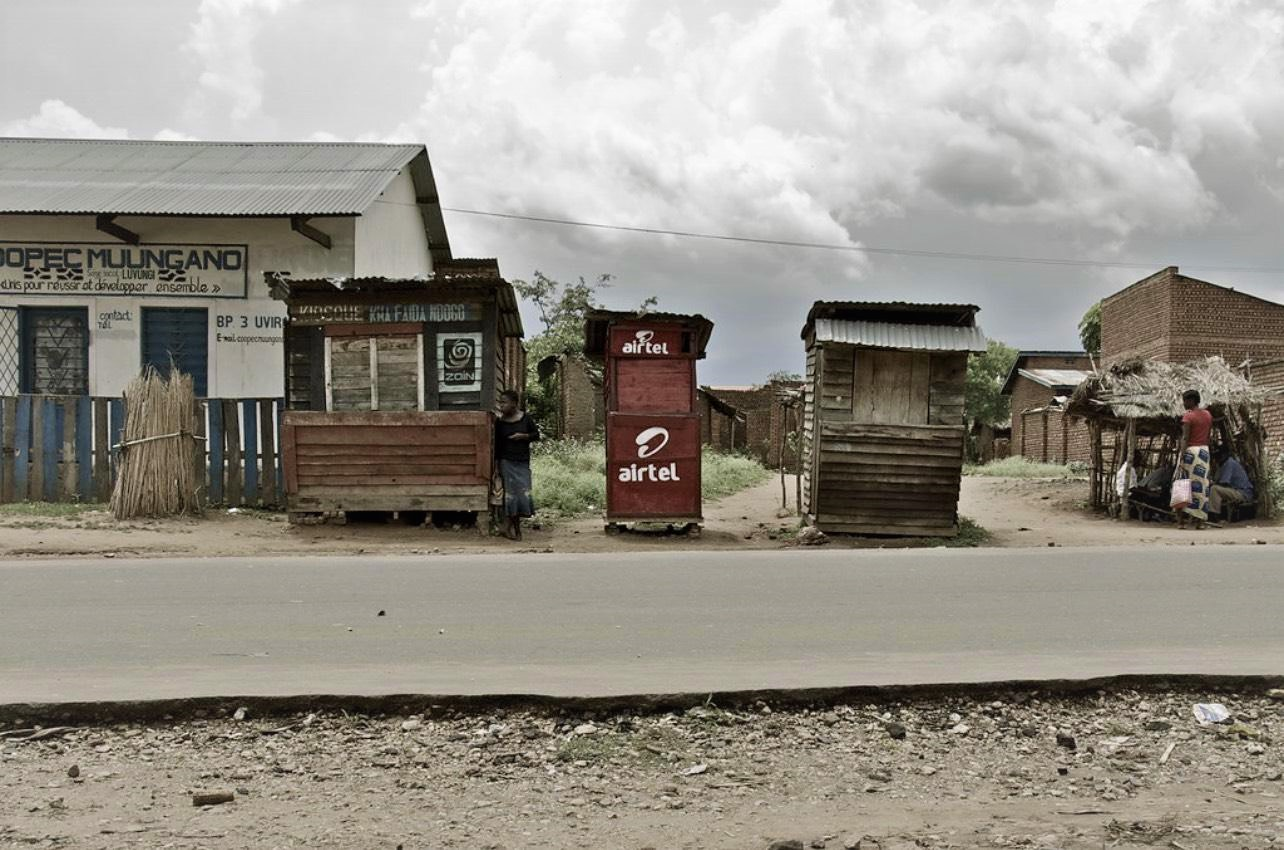
- Luvungi

- Location within Democratic Republic of the Congo
- Country: DR Congo
- Province: South Kivu
- Territory: Uvira
- Chiefdom: Bafuliiru

Government
  - Chef de groupement: Maisha Ombeni

Population (2016)
  - Total: 85,000
- Time zone: UTC+2 (CAT)

Luvungi, also known as Itara-Luvungi, is one of the groupements within the Bafuliiru Chiefdom in the Uvira Territory of the South Kivu province in the eastern Democratic Republic of the Congo. Located on the Ruzizi Plain, it borders Uvira and Walungu Territories, close to the frontiers of Rwanda and Burundi. The area is bordered by Ngweshe Chiefdom to the north, the Luvubu River to the south, the Ruzizi River to the east, and Kaziba Chiefdom to the west. With an estimated population of approximately 85,000 residents as of 2016, Luvungi is predominantly inhabited by Fuliru people, with smaller communities of Vira, Bembe, Lega, Shi, Burundians, and Banyamulenge. The local economy primarily relies on subsistence farming and artisanal cassiterite mining.

== Etymology ==
According to a report by the International Documentation Network on the African Great Lakes Region (Réseau documentaire international sur la région des grands lacs africains), the name Luvungi may derive from a Belgian alteration of the name Luvubu River, which was originally known as Iyombe.

== Geography ==
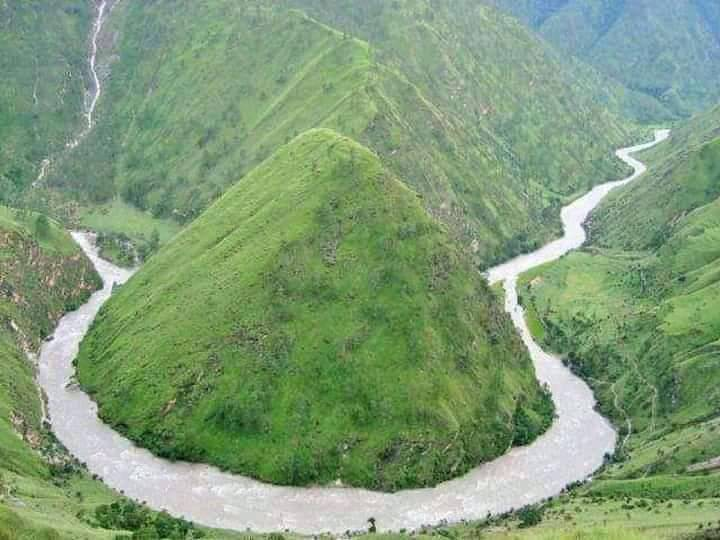
The Ruzizi River originates in Lake Kivu and flows into Lake Tanganyika, passing through several regions, including some of the most well-known areas of South Kivu. This image shows the river as it passes through Luvungi, in the Bafuliiru Chiefdom, within the Ruzizi Plain.

Luvungi is situated within the Ruzizi Plain, a vast low-lying region characterized by its fertile soils and extensive agricultural productivity. The plain extends between the Mitumba mountain range to the west and the Ruzizi River to the east. Luvungi's topography features two main relief zones: the eastern plains, which lie at elevations ranging from approximately 700 meters along the Ruzizi River, up to about 3,500 meters near the Mitumba Mountains in the west, and the western plateaus. The soils are diverse, including sandy, gravelly, black alluvial, and clayey types. This soil diversity supports cultivation of crops such as peanuts, maize, cotton, rice, and others.

Luvungi is traversed by the Ruvubu River, which feeds into the Ruzizi River, and by the Munyovwe River, a tributary of the Ruvubu. Historically, the Munyovwe River provided drinking water for local inhabitants until a formal water supply system was established in 2005. The region's vegetation comprises grassy savannahs and gallery forests, which support pastoral activities and livestock domestication. Luvungi has historically served as a transhumance route for pastoralists from neighboring regions, including Burundi and Rwanda, occasionally leading to community conflicts over land and resources.

The groupement experiences a tropical climate with a distinct seasonal pattern, featuring a rainy season lasting approximately nine months from September to May, and a dry season spanning June to August. The average annual rainfall is around 940 millimeters, though it can be as low as 600 millimeters per year, with distribution issues affecting agricultural productivity.

=== Government and administrative division ===
The Luvungi groupement is governed by a chef de groupement (grouping chief) who serves as the primary local authority and representative of the paramount mwami of Bafuliiru Chiefdom. The mwami retains traditional control over the land within the chiefdom, asserting ownership in accordance with customary law, a practice that diverges from the constitutional provisions of the Democratic Republic of the Congo, which affirms that private property rights are guaranteed by the state (as per Article 34 of the Constitution). While the state legally manages land rights and property, customary authorities, including the mwami and the chef de groupement, play a significant role in local land affairs, often collaborating with state authorities despite occasional conflicts over land jurisdiction and authority.

The chef de groupement is a hereditary position, descending from the mwami, and holds authority over the area, exercising administrative and customary functions. He is supported by a council of elders, who provide counsel and ensure that customary law is upheld. The chef de groupement oversees local governance, justice, and conflict resolution within his jurisdiction, delegating judicial authority to local trial leaders for minor cases, while more serious legal matters are handled directly by the mwami.

The Luvungi groupement is subdivided into villages, each headed by a chef de village who represents the chef de groupement. The chef de village performs customary and administrative functions, including protection, dispute resolution, and local management. Some chefs de village are traditional chiefs, while others are appointed based on expertise. A chef de sous-village (or chef de quartier) assists with tax collection and local administration. The hierarchy also includes a chef de colline (hill chief), who is appointed by the chef de village and associated with customary rituals of respect, including the presentation of a goat and a jug of drink.

| No. | Villages |
|---|---|
| 1. | Bwegera |
| 2. | Lubarika |
| 3. | Kakamba |
| 4. | Murunga |
| 5. | Ndolera |
| 6. | Katogota |
| 7. | Luberizi |
| 8. | Bulaga |
| 9. | Luburule |
| 10 | Bideka |

== History ==
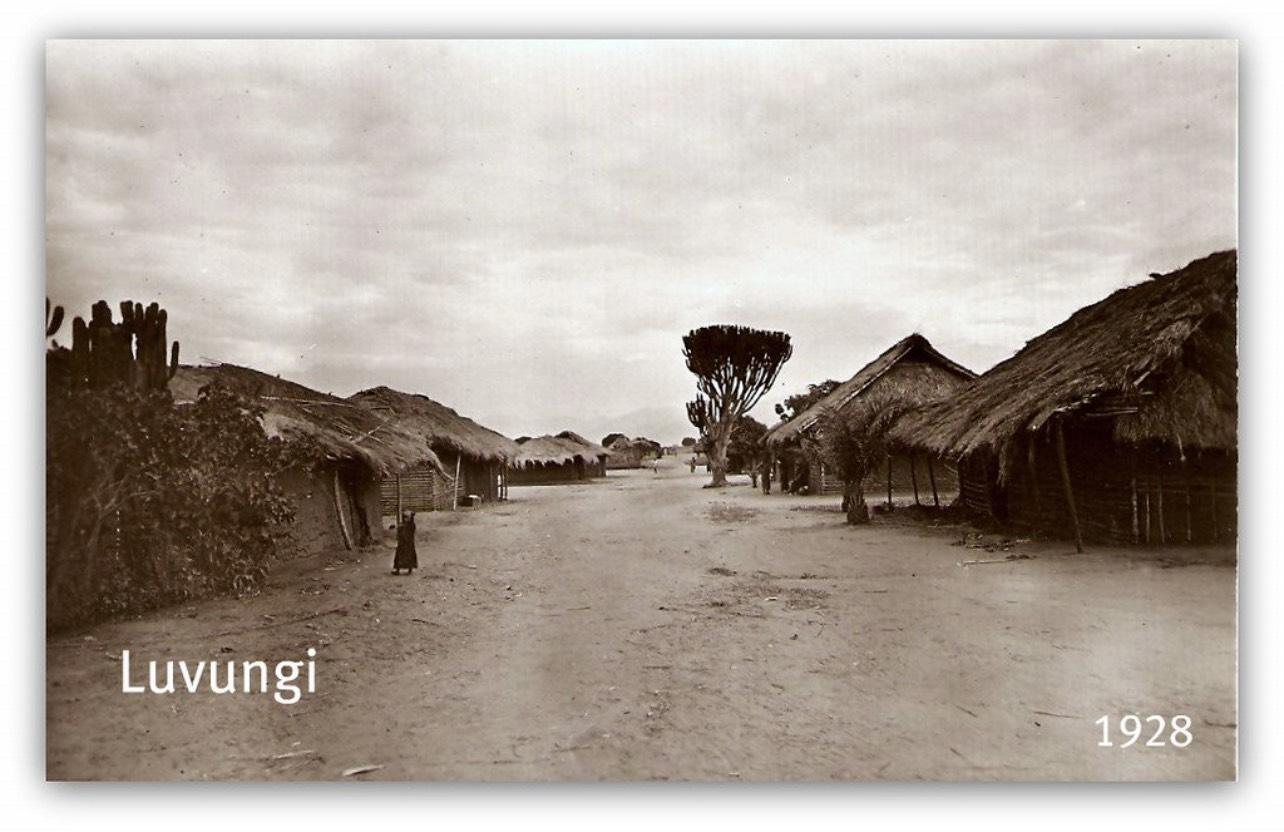
Post and village of Luvungi, Belgian Congo, ca. 1928

Before colonial rule, the Bafuliiru Chiefdom was ruled by mwami Kahamba Kalingishi, a member of the Bahamba clan. Authority was concentrated within the royal family, whose members also held leadership positions at the groupement level, known as Baluzi.

According to the International Documentation Network on the African Great Lakes Region (Réseau documentaire international sur la région des grands lacs africains), oral accounts from elderly residents indicate that Luvungi was uninhabited in the 1800s. The area consisted of savanna inhabited by wildlife, including buffaloes, elephants, and antelopes. Settlers later arrived from Ndolera, in the middle plateaus, and were mainly Fuliru. Others were Hutu Burundians who migrated in search of employment and agricultural opportunities. They were followed by Arab-Swahili traders involved in the Zanzibar slave trade.

After 1885, Belgian authorities began establishing their administration along the main road. In 1900, Kivu underwent administrative reorganization with the creation of the Territory of Ruzizi-Kivu (Territoire de Ruzizi-Kivu), which extended from Kamanyola to the Kihimbi River, with Uvira as its administrative capital. On 17 October 1900, a war council in Uvira divided the territory into two administrative zones: Rutshuru–Beni and Uvira. That year, the Congo Free State established military posts in several locations, including Luvungi, Kalembeleme, Nyakukemba (modern-day Bukavu), Bobandana, Goma, Lolo, Rutshuru, and Kasindi. Nearly 1,800 soldiers were reportedly deployed under the command of Inspecteur d'État Paul Costermans to secure the Kivu basin and prevent German encroachment. Colonial authorities also conducted police and military campaigns to subjugate resistant populations, including the Fuliru and Shi, while the Vira often served as auxiliaries and intermediaries in the colonial administration.

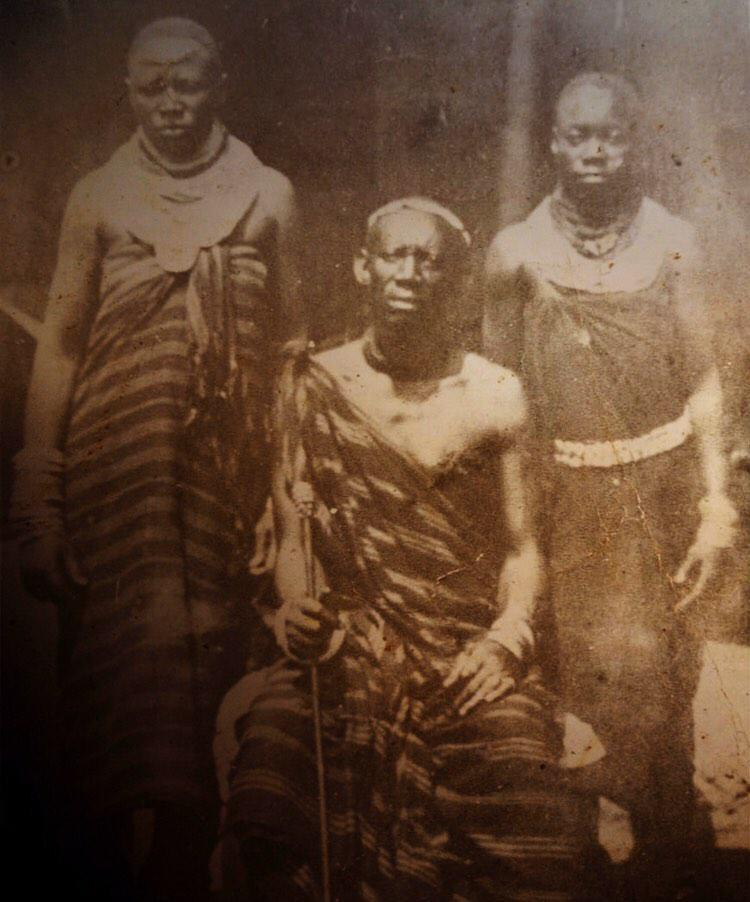
Mwami Nyamugira Mukogabwe II of the Bafuliiru Chiefdom, circa 1925 in Nia Magira (Lemera). Seated at the center, he is adorned in traditional attire, holding a staff that signifies his authority.

By 1904, the Uvira zone comprised six sectors: Uvira, Luvungi, Baraka, Kalembelembe, Bobandana, and Nyalukemba. On 18 October 1908, King Leopold II ceded the Congo Free State to Belgium, which subsequently became the Belgian Congo. A ministerial decree of 11 September 1911 placed Kivu under the jurisdiction of the Stanleyville District in Orientale Province. On 3 November 1913, Kivu became a separate district within the province. On 12 January 1915, German forces raided Luvungi during the East African campaign. The raid ended in German defeat at the hands of the Belgian Force Publique, and the German commander, Karl Schimmer, was killed.

In 1920, a colonial post was established at Luvungi under J. Cunds. Negotiations subsequently took place between Chief Kabwika and territorial authorities to address administrative issues. Road construction and increased settlement from the middle and high plateaus contributed to changes in the Ruzizi Plain. Luvungi became a groupement within the Bafuliiru Chiefdom. Kabwika, its first Fuliru chief, belonged to the ruling family.

On 18 August 1928, Uvira Territory was established, and it included three chiefdoms: Bafuliiru, Bavira, and Barundi (now Ruzizi Plain). Kabwika, the first Fuliiru chief of the Luvungi groupement, belonged to the ruling family.

Around 1950, conflict emerged between the Fuliru and Rundi, with Marandura among the Fuliru leaders involved. Around 1963, fighting broke out between supporters of the Mouvement National Congolais (MNC), led by Marandura, and the Parti National Populaire (PNP), reportedly in the context of the Mulelist rebellion. Luvungi was also affected by the Schramme conflict of 1967–1968 and served as a rear base for government forces.

The First Congo War, led by the Alliance of Democratic Forces for the Liberation of Congo (AFDL), under Laurent-Désiré Kabila, brought displacement, looting, and massacres of civilians to Luvungi. In 1998, the Second Congo War involving the Congolese Rally for Democracy (RCD) resulted in killings, looting, and damage to socioeconomic infrastructure. In 2004, the conflict associated with Colonel Jules Mutebusi also caused looting, civilian displacement to Burundi, and deaths.

=== Customary power ===
==== Early leadership and the reign of Kabwika (1912–1920) ====
Luvungi has traditionally been governed by bami (plural of mwami). Kabwika was the first officially recognized mwami of Luvungi, ruling from 1912 to 1920. At the time, the area was known as the Luvuluga Chiefdom (Chefferie de Luvuluga), near Kaziba Chiefdom. Appointed by the Belgian colonial administration, Kabwika was the son of the former Fuliru mwami Nyamugira I. According to Innocent Bihundo Kityaba's 2015 study, Impact des rébellions Congolaises sur le pouvoir coutumier dans le groupement d'Itara Luvungi (1996–2014), increased Rundi migration to the Ruzizi Plain during Kabwika's reign fueled protracted land disputes. Kabwika opposed the expansion of outside groups and was eventually deported to Rutshuru and temporarily succeeded by Chief Makora, who permitted more Burundian migrants to settle in the area. During Kabwika's rule, the groupement had 25 localités ("localities"), which were managed jointly by Belgian colonial officials and local chiefs.

| No. | Localités | Chefs de localités |
|---|---|---|
| 1. 2. 3. 4. 5. 6. 7. 8. 9. 10 11 12 13 14 15 16 17 18 19 20 21 22 23 24 25 | Gombaniro Bulaga Nyamutiri Bugegwa Igaze/Busulira Kanigo Kasaba Kanguli Katembo Mbunga Ndolera Kahungwe Bideka Kitembo Kishale Munanira Muhungu Kamonyi Kakumbukumbu Kinyinya Matale Igangu Kitembo Kinigo Mulwa | Lubarika Mavudiko Kayamba Naruramba Nigaze Kiramba Businga Muzingwa Nakanguli Mubeza Lulege Binanda Kirege Mwene Kashemangwa Namudigi Nakishale Mukina Kafizi Mshombe Bashangazo Mulenga Bene Karazo Mabandiro Nabulizi Munosoli Nakanigo Kabambire Nazingo |

==== The reign of Mbabaro (1920–1937) ====
Mbabaro succeeded his father, Kabwika, in 1920 and, like him, pledged allegiance to the colonial authorities. Construction work on a railway intended to connect Lake Tanganyika with Lake Kivu encouraged migration from the middle plateaus to the Ruzizi Plain. Stravoulakis, a Greek settler, arrived in Luvungi in 1926 and was among the area's first traders and livestock farmers.

Mwami Mbabaro died in 1937, when his heir, Kimbumbu, was eight years old. Makora, a village chief selected by the elders, became regent. According to Bihundo, Makora abused his authority and struggled to control the groupement, while increased cattle theft intensified local conflicts. Several minor chiefs, described as petits bami ("little bami"), subsequently held power in succession.

| No. | Mwami | Period of rule | Notable events |
|---|---|---|---|
| 1 | Kabwika | 1912–1920 | Rundi migration and the development of tensions between communities. |
| 2 | Mbabaro | 1920–1937 | Belgian colonial rule, the establishment of the first commercial businesses, and construction work on a railway intended to connect Lake Tanganyika with Lake Kivu. |
| 3 | Makora | 1938–1941 | Political instability, abuses of authority, and cattle theft during the regency. |
| 4 | Mugombekere | 1941–1945 | Kimbumbu, the customary heir, assumed power after pressure from local notables. |
| 5 | Kimbumbu | 1945–1955 | Relative stability, economic recovery, and construction of an airfield. |
| 6 | Mutanga | 1955–1969 | An attempt during the regency to rename the groupement from Luvulaga to Itara-Luvungi; the spread of the Mulelist rebellion amid local conflicts; and unrest involving Lumumbist youth led by Moïse "Musa" Marandura. |
| 7 | Ombeni Kimbumbu II | 1969–1976 | Stabilization after the Mulelist rebellion. |
| 8 | Shalupa Kawila | 1976–1977 | Brief regency. |
| 9 | Ndare Oyo | 1977–1990 | Stability and construction of schools, dispensaries, and roads. |
| 10 | Ombeni Kimbumbu II (Second reign) | 1991–1995 | He was poisoned and succeeded by Mbambaro. |

==== Kimbumbu's era, post-war growth, rebellion, and political change (1945–1977) ====
Kimbumbu ascended the throne in 1945. Construction of the Luvungi airfield was completed during his reign. The airstrip was intended to support Belgian military operations and the transport of light agricultural equipment to Luvungi. Cotton cultivation also expanded in the Ruzizi Plain during this period.

Kimbumbu's death in 1955 was followed by another period of regency and instability. After independence in 1960, Congo Crisis affected the Ruzizi Plain. The Mulelist rebellion gained a foothold in the region and support from some local notables. According to Bihundo, Lumumbist youth led by Marandura were involved in theft, rape, and looting.

Following the 1964 rebellion and the events involving Jean Schramme in 1967, the Ruzizi Plain experienced a period of relative stability. Ombeni Kimbumbu II and Shalupa Kawila ruled successively between 1969 and 1977. Kawila, appointed by the Uvira zone commissioner, faced local opposition. In 1990, Chief Ndare Oyo succeeded him.

==== Ndare Oyo (1977–1990) and Kimbumbu's reign (1996–1998) ====
Ndare Oyo ascended the throne at 23. During his reign, he promoted the construction of village schools and health centers and encouraged cotton cultivation. He ruled until the return of mwami Ndare Simba.

Simba did not succeed him because customary succession did not permit authority to pass from brother to brother. Ombeni Kimbumbu was reinstated as chief for a second term but died four years later due to poisoning. Chief Bikoba became regent and was charged with caring for the young prince Joseph Mbabaro Ombeni. His regency was marked by political instability in the groupement.

From the late 1990s onward, Luvungi entered a prolonged period of contested leadership, shaped by internal dynastic disputes, civil conflict, and armed group interference. In 1996, Ndaye Kimbumbu, son of Kimbumbu, was appointed as regent for the young heir, Joseph Mbabaro Ombeni. When the Rally for Congolese Democracy (Rassemblement Congolais pour la Démocratie; RCD) arrived on 2 August 1998, elders and local notables organized opposition to Ndaye's rule. He was ousted and went into exile in Kinshasa. Mbabaro sought to assume the authority exercised on his behalf, which then led to a succession dispute with Ndaye. Both belonged to the same dynasty. As Mbabaro was still considered unable to rule, his paternal uncle, Ndanoga, was appointed interim chief.

On 7 August 1998, mwami Simon Ndare Simba II and the elders proposed appointing Ndare's cousin, Levis Kagombe, as chief of the groupement.

==== The regencies of Levis Kagombe and Bwenge (1998–2001) ====
Levis Kagombe succeeded Ndanoga as regent with support from Prince Joseph Mbabaro Ombeni, the mwami, and the elders of the Itara-Luvungi groupement. Twenty-four of the 29 local notables opposed him, arguing that he did not belong to the ruling dynasty. Kagombe responded by removing several notables he considered of leading this opposition. Mbabaro subsequently mobilized the notables to oust him.

According to Bihundo, Mai-Mai fighters helped Mbabaro eliminate Kagombe, who was killed on 7 March 2001. The fighters later turned against Mbabaro, accusing him of failing to honor agreements, particularly by refusing to expel individuals the Mai-Mai considered infiltrators. Following Kagombe's death, the mwami appointed Bwenge, who was outside the ruling dynasty, to administer the groupement. Mai-Mai fighters assassinated him after two days in office. Several local notables had joined the Mai-Mai and opposed the regency's policies, which they viewed as favorable to the occupying rebel movement.

==== Prince Joseph Mbabaro's rule and Ndaye's second regency (2001–2012) ====
Joseph Mbabaro returned to Luvungi and demanded reinstatement. He ruled from 2001 to 2003, a period Bihundo describes as marked by instability, lawlessness, and allegations of sexual violence. He was suspended and replaced by Dunia Fandi Kimbumbu, who was a member of the ruling dynasty.

Fandi sought to unite the population to resolve local conflicts. According to Bihundo, Mbabaro organized a Mai-Mai militia to obstruct these efforts. Fandi was forced from office, and Ndaye Kimbumbu returned to power. Bihundo noted that he returned to power in 2008 amid continued conflict with Mbabaro. Mbabaro claimed the chieftaincy through his father, Ombeni, who had died in 1995, but had initially been too young to assume office.

Ndaye proposed Mbabaro's return to office in accordance with customary succession. Mbabaro was the son of Ndaye's elder brother. As Mbabaro also challenged mwami Ndare's authority, the mwami and the groupement's council of elders sought to resolve the succession dispute. Mbabaro's return was subject to conditions. In 2012, territorial authorities were invited to attend the disputed transfer of power.

==== Mbabaro's reign, rising tensions, political rise, and renewed succession crisis ====
Joseph Mbabaro Ombeni is the son of Ombeni Kimbumbu II and Antoinette Yowari. He lacked the full endorsement of mwami Ndare, and unrest spread after he took power, particularly in Lubarika. Mai-Mai fighters occupied the northwestern part of the groupement, and according to Bihundo, Mbabaro was initially suspected of supporting the movement, but Mai-Mai fighters later pursued him over alleged links to unidentified men described as suspected infiltrators. Residents sought to reconcile Mbabaro with the fighters, who Bihundo said were fighting on behalf of the population. Mbabaro went into exile in Bukavu pending mediation, leaving the groupement without a leader, before returning.

Despite Luvungi's growth, which warranted its designation as a commune, Mbabaro opposed this change. Bihundo also reports that residents opposed his rule over grievances including alleged illegal sales of farmland and his sale of the Kindobwe marsh. Residents launched an uprising with support from civil society and National Assembly deputy Luc Mulimbalimba Masururu, after which the marsh was returned to the population.

In the 2018 provincial elections, Joseph Mbabaro Ombeni was elected a provincial deputy representing Uvira Territory for the People's Party for Reconstruction and Democracy (Parti du Peuple pour la Reconstruction et la Démocratie; PPRD). His family subsequently notified the provincial governor that his sister, Antoinette Mbabaro, would succeed him as groupement chief. In May 2019, however, mwami Adams Ndare III Simba Kalingishi appointed Maisha Ombeni instead, and this renewed tensions between supporters of the mwami and the Mbabaro family.

Violence erupted during Maisha Ombeni's enthronement ceremony, during which eight people were injured. Supporters of the Mbabaro family blocked the Luvubu Bridge to prevent the mwami and Mulimbalimba from reaching Luvungi for the ceremony. Police intervened, and FARDC reinforcements arrived, which allowed the installation to proceed.

In 2020, the Catholic school coordination in Luvungi filed a complaint accusing Mbabaro of supporting a militia allegedly responsible for threats against Father Joseph Musafiri and Cizungu Machane, principal of the Umoja-Katogota Institute. Mbabaro denied the allegations, calling them unfounded and defamatory, and threatened legal action. He died in Bukavu on 5 August 2021 from COVID-19 complications.

== Demographics ==
Luvungi is ethnically diverse and is predominantly inhabited by the indigenous Fuliru people. It also has communities of Burundian Hutu origin, alongside other Congolese ethnic groups, including the Shi, Bembe, Lega, Nyindu, and Vira. Relations between the Fuliru and other communities have generally been peaceful, although tensions with some Rundi have occasionally emerged amid regional political and socioeconomic developments involving Rwanda and Burundi.

Formal education began during the colonial period with the establishment of the first school in 1930. The school provided literacy and vocational training for workers, including cooks, sentinels, agricultural monitors, clerks, soldiers, and municipal functionaries serving the colonial administration. By 2016, Luvungi had more than 45 primary and secondary schools operated by Catholic, Protestant, and government authorities.

Healthcare services were introduced during the colonial era, when Catholic missionaries established the first rural dispensary around 1940. Healthcare facilities include three hospitals: Luvungi I, Luvungi II, and Mirungu, as well as two health posts (COMICO and Methodist), one private dispensary, and other private and faith-based clinics.

Religious institutions include 29 churches affiliated with the 8th CEPAC (Communauté des Églises de Pentecôte en Afrique Centrale), alongside Catholic, Adventist, Anglican, Methodist, and other Christian denominations.

== Economy ==
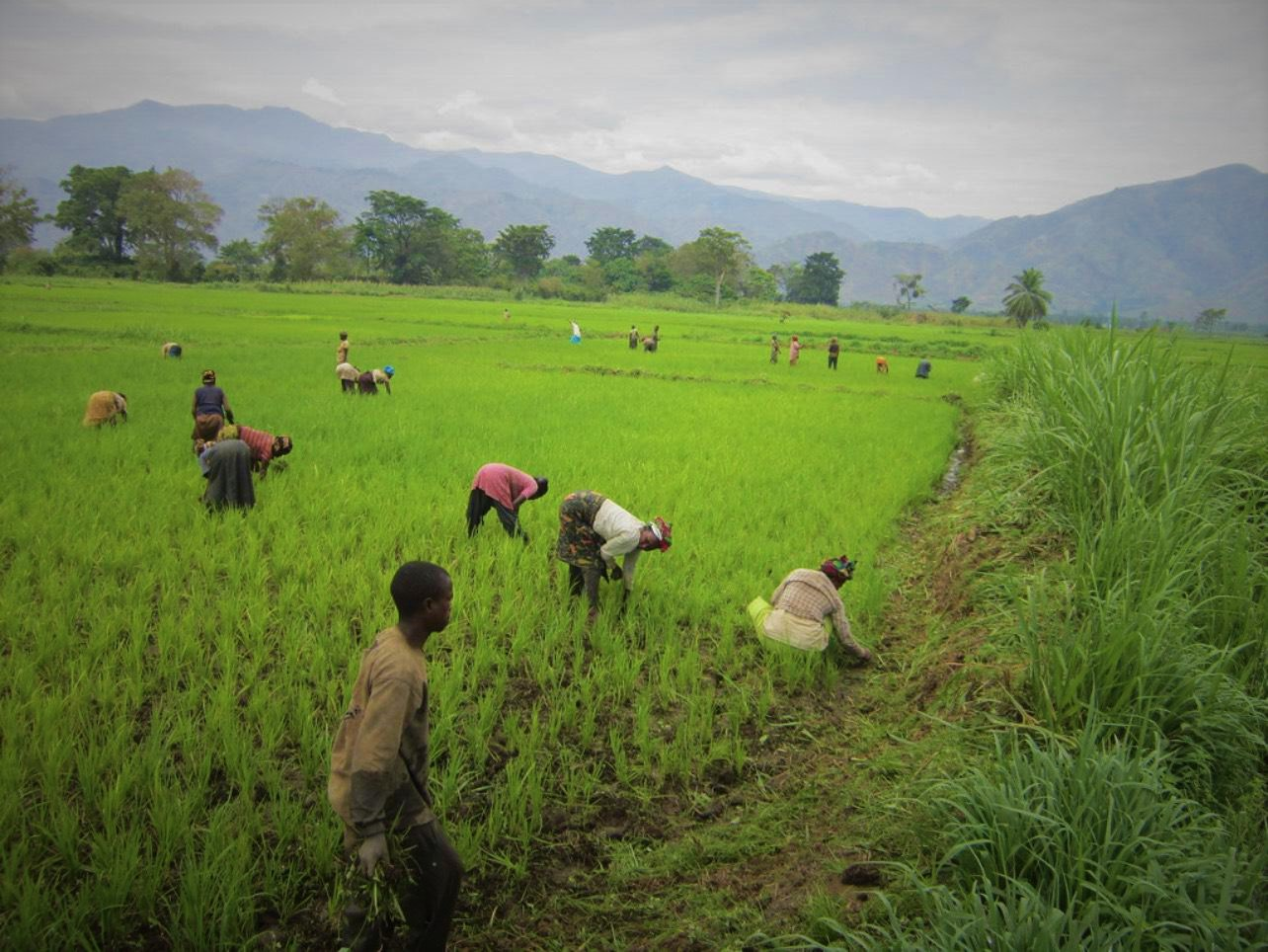
Ruzizi Plain

Luvungi's economy is mainly based on agriculture and livestock farming. Before colonization, residents practiced subsistence farming, cultivating crops such as cassava, maize, beans, and bananas. Colonial authorities later imposed the cultivation of cash crops, such as cotton and coffee. As of 2004, local cultivation includes cassava, beans, maize, tomatoes, coffee, cotton, and bananas, while livestock production focuses mainly on cattle, goats, and rabbits.

Historically, blacksmithing constituted a significant artisanal craft, as locally forged Fuliiru hoes and other iron tools were traditionally exchanged for ornamental beads imported from Burundi. However, this trade has not undergone modernization and remains largely confined to small-scale, manual production.

== Security problems ==
=== First and Second Congo Wars ===
On 20 October 1996, during the First Congo War, the Alliance of Democratic Forces for the Liberation of Congo-Zaire (AFDL), Rwandan Patriotic Army (RPA), and Forces Armées Burundaises (FAB) forces attacked refugee camps in the Bafuliiru Chiefdom, including those in Luvungi. About 100 Burundian and Rwandan Hutu refugees were killed in the camps. The same forces also killed an unknown number of refugees, including about 20 at the hospital in Kanganiro camp. They also killed refugees who had sought shelter in local civilians' homes. On 21 October 1996, the forces continued their attacks in Lubarika village, killing an unknown number of Rwandan and Burundian refugees and Zairean civilians fleeing after the withdrawal of the Zairian Armed Forces (Forces Armées Zaïroises; FAZ). Local residents were forced to bury the bodies in four large mass graves. On the same day, about 370 refugees were killed in Luberizi and Mutarule. Some victims' bodies were found in pit latrines, while others were discovered in houses.

The rise of the Rally for Congolese Democracy (RCD) during the Second Congo War increased tensions in the Ruzizi Plain. This happened because local power and alliances among the Banyamulenge, Rundi, and Fuliru began to change, mainly in Luvungi and Sange. The RCD also gained control over some mineral resources, while its military operations affected the Ruzizi Plain and Walungu Territory, Kabare Territory, Kalehe Territory, and Shabunda Territory. Many people were killed or forced to leave their homes, with some fleeing to the middle plateaus of Luvungi.

In 1998, the RCD tried to weaken the authority of traditional rulers, but they stood against these efforts, and as a result, more people in the local communities opposed the RCD. By 1999, the RCD began including traditional chiefs in its administration to gain local support. During the national transition period (2003–2006), traditional leaders in RCD-controlled areas helped maintain stability and support national reconciliation.

Between 2000 and 2003, fighters from Kitanda formed a Mai-Mai militia to protect the people in their area. They built a base in Kabingu, in Luvungi, and carried out their activities in the mid-altitude plateau. General Ruharara led the group and became known for his ability to organize and guide the fighters. He mobilized local leaders and social groups for a unified resistance and began recruiting more fighters and assigned roles to Colonel Ndafura, Major Kizingati, and another commander known as Abdou. Meanwhile, other Mai-Mai groups, including those led by Kayamba Kihumbi in the Lemera groupement, faced frequent attacks by RCD forces.

In 2003, General Ruharara held a meeting in Buheba, Katembo, with Mai-Mai groups from different parts of the province. The meeting lasted two weeks and reportedly gathered about 800 fighters each day. Its main goal was to free South Kivu from RCD control, particularly in Luvungi. The RCD tried to stop the gathering by creating a militia, but the gathering continued. Traditional spiritual practices and cultural beliefs helped the fighters stay united, and their struggle in the Ruzizi Plain continued, even as the Sun City Agreement of 2002 helped move the country toward the end of the Second Congo War in 2003.

=== Ongoing insecurity problems ===
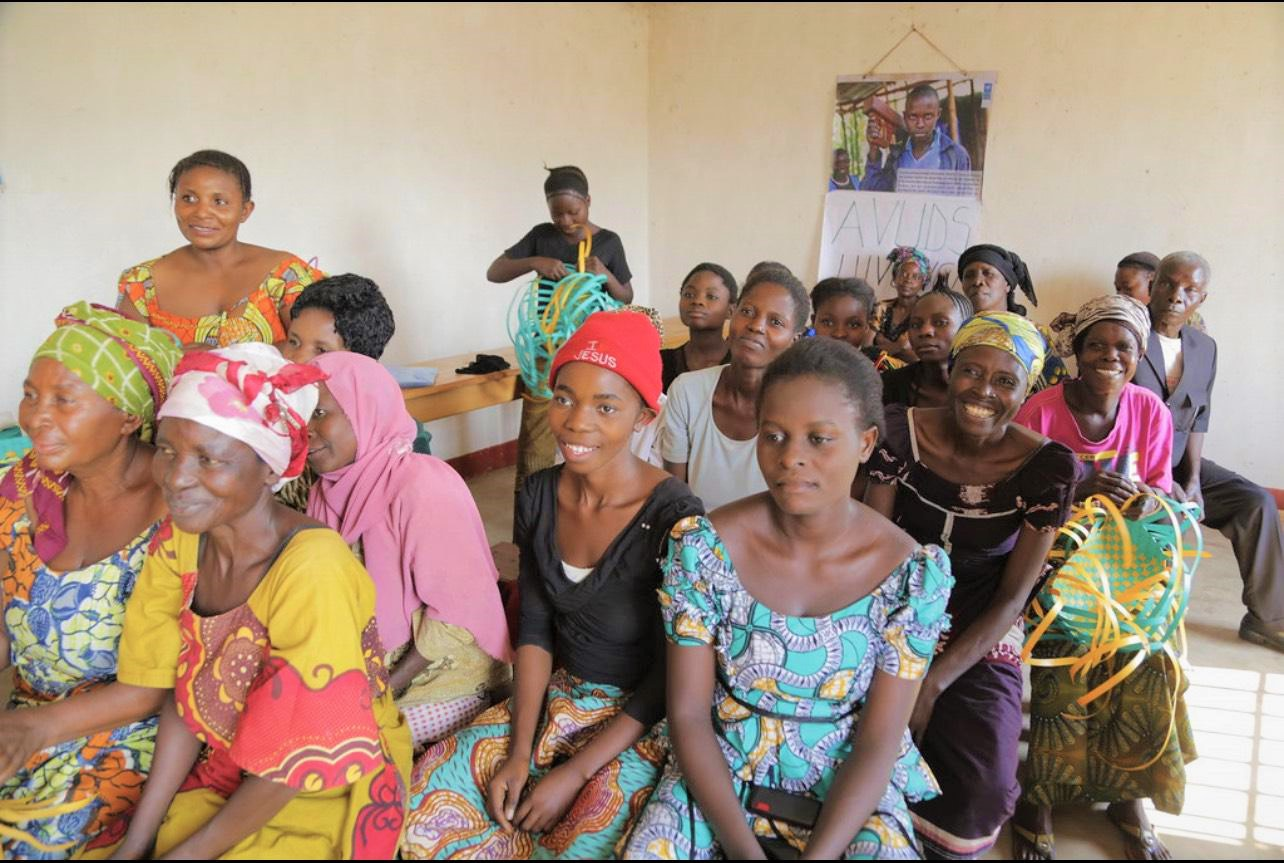
Women of Luvungi in June 2016

Following the official end of the war in 2003, insecurity persisted in Luvungi and surrounding areas. On 15 December 2005, 155 people, including 44 civilians from the Luvungi assembly camp, were repatriated to Rwanda through the Bugarama border by the United Nations Mission in the Democratic Republic of Congo (MONUC) through its Disarmament, Demobilisation, Repatriation, Reintegration and Resettlement (DDRRR) program. This repatriation, which began in October 2005, marked one of several waves that included former Rwandan Hutu rebels and their dependents. By early 2006, another group of 15 Rwandan Hutu rebels had returned to Rwanda, while 350 dependents were being held at a refugee assembly point in Sange. Luvungi remained a hotspot for armed conflict in the following years. In July 2009, the Armed Forces of the Democratic Republic of the Congo (FARDC) clashed with Democratic Forces for the Liberation of Rwanda (FDLR) rebels entrenched in Murunga, four kilometers from Luvungi. The confrontation was part of ongoing military operations targeting remaining pockets of FDLR resistance in the Ruzizi Plain. The FDLR had been regrouping in the area in an attempt to cross into neighboring Burundi. FARDC troops arrested two attackers during the engagement. FDLR activity was also reported in nearby localities such as Ndolera, Lubarika, and Kigushwe, though these remained under FARDC control.

In September 2009, internal divisions within the FARDC further destabilized Luvungi. A power struggle emerged between the 33rd and 109th brigades over control of Operation Kimia II, a joint military operation aimed at neutralizing FDLR forces. The 33rd brigade, newly deployed from North Kivu and reportedly unpopular among the local population, attempted to assume leadership of the operation. In response, the 109th brigade, which had formal command, resisted. Miscommunication and mutual suspicion led to armed clashes between the two units on two separate nights. Military sources suggested that the first incident may have been triggered by a fire at the local market, mistakenly believed to be an FDLR attack. The infighting resulted in the arrest of 11 FARDC soldiers in December 2009, and the demobilization of three child soldiers who were subsequently handed over to MONUC's Child Protection Section in Uvira. In April 2010, students staged protests against ongoing insecurity, blocking the Bukavu-Uvira road near Luvungi after a family was attacked by armed men, leaving two people injured. FARDC troops fired into the air to disperse the demonstrators and restore order. Between 27 and 28 March 2010, five people were murdered in the territories of Kabare, Mwenga, and Uvira. Among the victims were a soldier, the president of a civil society group, and a local chief. In Luvungi, two men were killed at point-blank range by unidentified armed men, while in other regions, attacks were attributed to FDLR combatants.

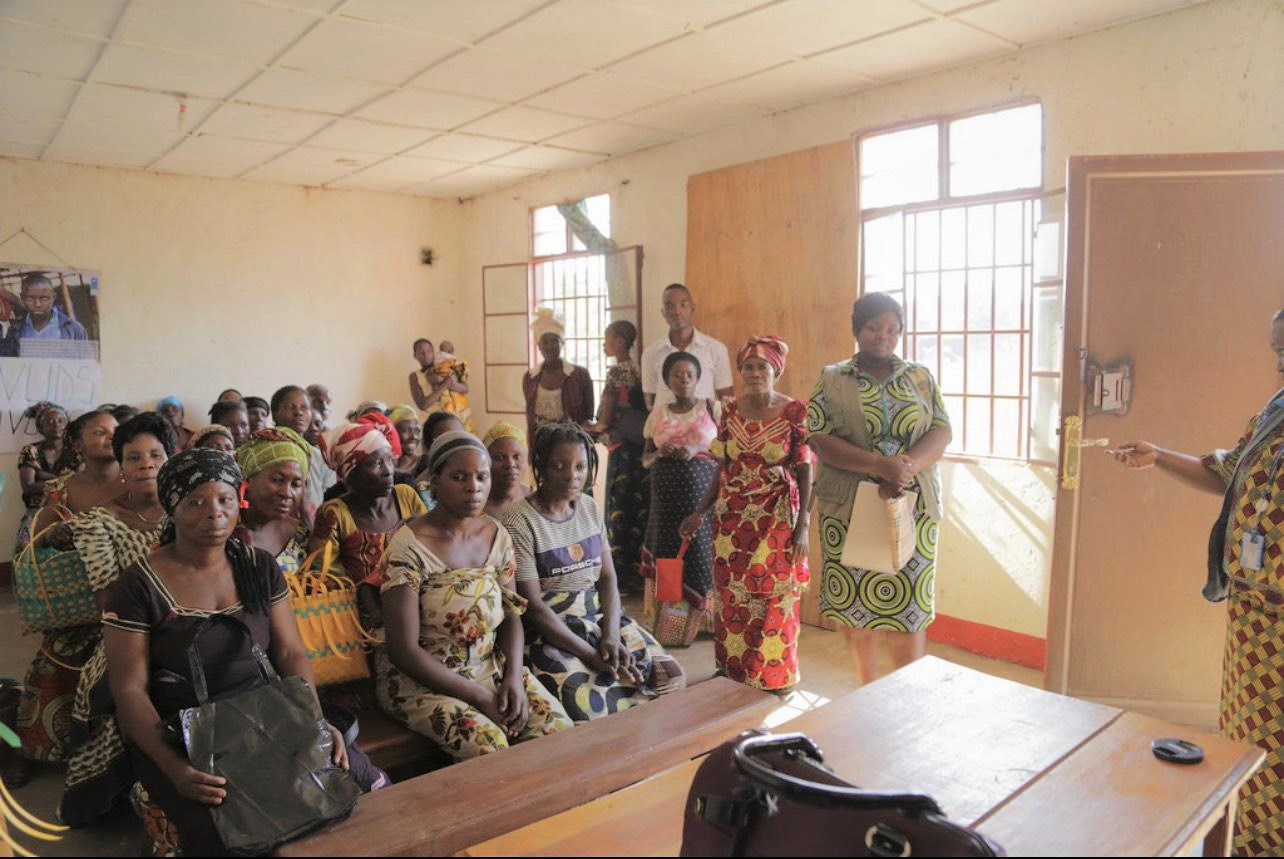
A group of women gathered inside a classroom in Luvungi

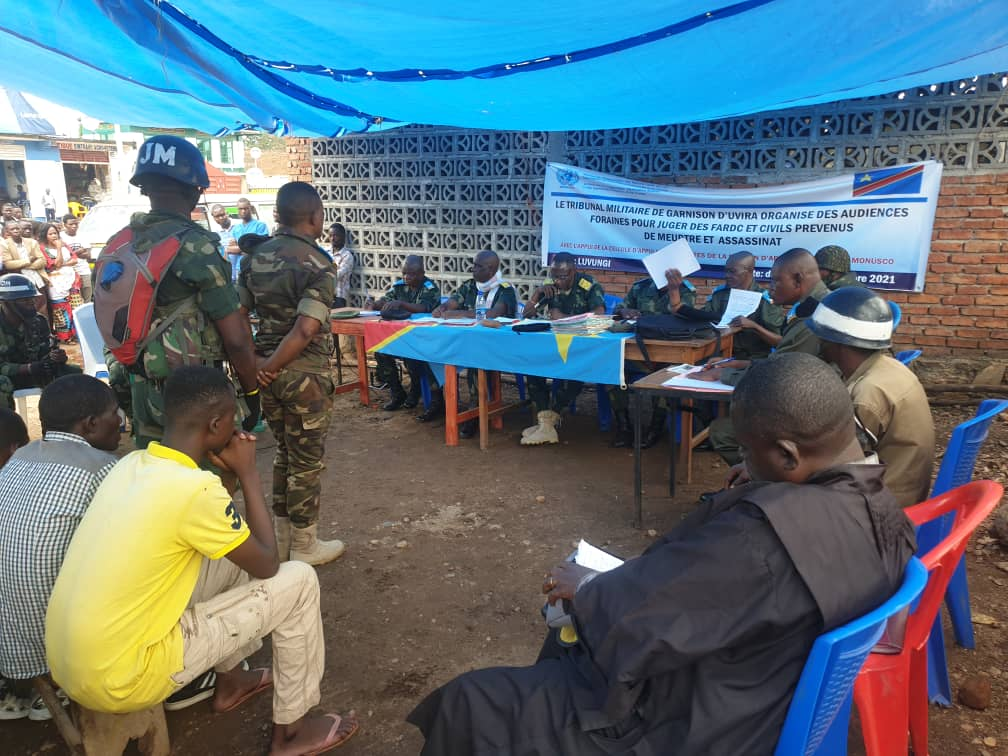
An outdoor mobile court hearing organized in Luvungi supported by MONUSCO's Justice Support Section.

In May 2011, Luvungi witnessed violent protests organized by civil society groups, farmers, and herders against a former chef de groupement accused of land mismanagement, illegal land sales, and militia activity. The protests escalated into violence when the former chief allegedly dispatched youths to confront demonstrators, leading to four injuries. Though territorial authorities had suspended him two months earlier, he reportedly refused to cede power and maintained an armed group to oppose his successor. National and military police forces were deployed to maintain order. In response to broader regional insecurity, FARDC reinforced its presence in Luvungi. On 30 August 2011, additional troops were deployed to Lubarika after armed men looted the area and stole livestock. In May 2012, the National Commission for Refugees (Commission Nationale pour les Réfugiés; CNR) launched a sensitization campaign targeting military and civilian authorities in Kamanyola and Katogota, aiming to encourage the voluntary repatriation of Burundian refugees residing in Uvira Territory. Later, in November 2012, DDRRR and the United Nations High Commissioner for Refugees (UNHCR) repatriated four former FDLR members and two Rwandan civilians, including one from Luvungi, to Rwanda.

In May 2013, security concerns were exacerbated when a 12-year-old girl was killed during an exchange of fire between soldiers and armed men in Luvungi. The following year, in March 2014, Luvungi faced a humanitarian crisis when nearly 4,000 displaced families arrived from Bwegera after the murder of two people in that village. The influx worsened pre-existing housing shortages, particularly after the collapse of 400 houses due to heavy rains two months prior. Displaced families reported living in incomplete structures without doors or windows and receiving no assistance, often sleeping on mats in unsanitary conditions. On 6 June 2014, a massacre occurred in the village of Mutarule, where 36 people—primarily from the Bafuliiru community—were killed, some by gunfire and others by being burned alive. The event occurred despite repeated warnings issued by residents to both the United Nations Mission in the Democratic Republic of Congo (MONUC) and the Congolese armed forces. The lack of response prompted public outcry, leading Martin Kobler, then head of MONUC, to issue a formal apology. The Congolese government initiated an investigation, and approximately 5,700 displaced persons demanded the restoration of security in the area. The resulting power vacuum and ongoing instability were exploited by various groups to perpetrate further violence, looting, and theft. Among the key figures during this period was a Mai-Mai commander known as Bede, who initially presented himself as a patriot but was later exposed as a central instigator of armed robberies and violent unrest throughout the Ruzizi Plain. Following continued destabilization efforts, Bede was ultimately killed by gunfire in Uvira on 29 August 2015. His death marked the beginning of a relative period of calm in the region, but intercommunal tensions in the Ruzizi Plain, particularly in Mutarule, persist. Disputes between the Bafuliiru, who consider themselves the indigenous population, and the Barundi, often perceived as newcomers, strained their relations and complicate peacebuilding efforts. In September 2022, six members of the Mayï-Mayï Buhirwa militia, including the group's second-in-command, Mathias Byamungu Demahyi, surrendered to the FARDC in Luvungi. These fighters, active in the region between the Ruzizi Plain and the plateaus of Kigoma and Lemera groupements, turned over a cache of weapons, grenades. Their surrender followed that of another senior figure in the group, Ndumwe Kahiri Noir, who had laid down arms three weeks earlier at MONUSCO's DDRRR center in Uvira.
