= 2014 Mutarule attack =

Terrorist incident in Democratic Republic of the Congo

2014 South Kivu attack
- Location of South Kivu in Democratic Republic of the Congo
- Location: 2°59′3″S 29°5′35″E; Mutarule, South Kivu, Democratic Republic of the Congo
- Date: 6–7 June 2014
- Deaths: Around 35

On the night of June 6–7, 2014, the village of Mutarule, near Luberizi, in South Kivu, Democratic Republic of the Congo, was attacked. Around 35 people were killed in the attack, with the exact count varying. It is thought the attack was revenge for the death of a cattle herder who died in a failed robbery. The attack may have also been ethnically motivated.

== Background ==
The South Kivu region of the Democratic Republic of the Congo hosts people who fled Burundi during the civil war and multiple rebel groups including the Democratic Forces for the Liberation of Rwanda (FDLR) and the National Liberation Forces (FNL). There are often conflicts in the area between ethnic Barundi, who emigrated from Burundi a couple of generations ago, and ethnic Bafuliru.

In August 2013, eight residents of Mutarule were killed in an attack by unidentified armed men. An armed militia is stationed about 12 miles (19 km) from the village, but the perpetrators of the attack were never determined.

== Attack ==
During the evening of June 6–7, 2014, the village of Mutarule in South Kivu was attacked. According to eyewitnesses, gunmen surrounded a local Protestant church and began firing indiscriminately. Other victims, all of whom were ethnic Bafuliru, were stabbed or burned in their homes.

Several pregnant women were among the dead, which numbered 27 according to South Kivu governor Marcellin Cishambo. However, a government spokesperson said 34 people had died in the attack. A Reuters cameraman counted 37 bodies. An eyewitness reported 33 deaths: 9 men, 14 women, and 10 children. A different eyewitness report said 18 women and 8 children were among 33 dead. An additional 20 to 30 people were injured, 10 seriously.

== Cause and aftermath ==
Government officials said the attack was part of a dispute over cattle. Earlier a cattle herder had been killed while attempting to take cattle from another farmer. The community of the deceased then organized a revenge attack, according to a government spokesperson. A United Nations (UN) statement said "fierce fighting" between the Bafuliru and Barundi had taken place the night before the attack. Some locals blamed the FNL for the attack, or said a local politician was to blame for "stoking ethnic tension." The government quickly denied foreigners, such as the FNL, were involved. "Congolese [have] carried out these attacks," remarked Cishambo. "The problem is that everyone in this area carries a weapon."

After the attack, some Mutarule natives packed up their belongings and moved away. A village elder commented "The first massacre took place, then the second one has just happened - and we did not even get to know what happened with the first massacre. We wonder why the killings should go on while the government is watching."

The UN said it would send MONUSCO peacekeeping troops to the area to protect the population. "These violent acts are unacceptable and need to stop immediately," said mission head Martin Kobler. The local army commander was fired for a slow response to the attack. A man suspected of organizing the attack was arrested.

== See also ==
- List of massacres in the Democratic Republic of the Congo
