= Lubarika =

Village in Bafuliru Chiefdom, Uvira Territory

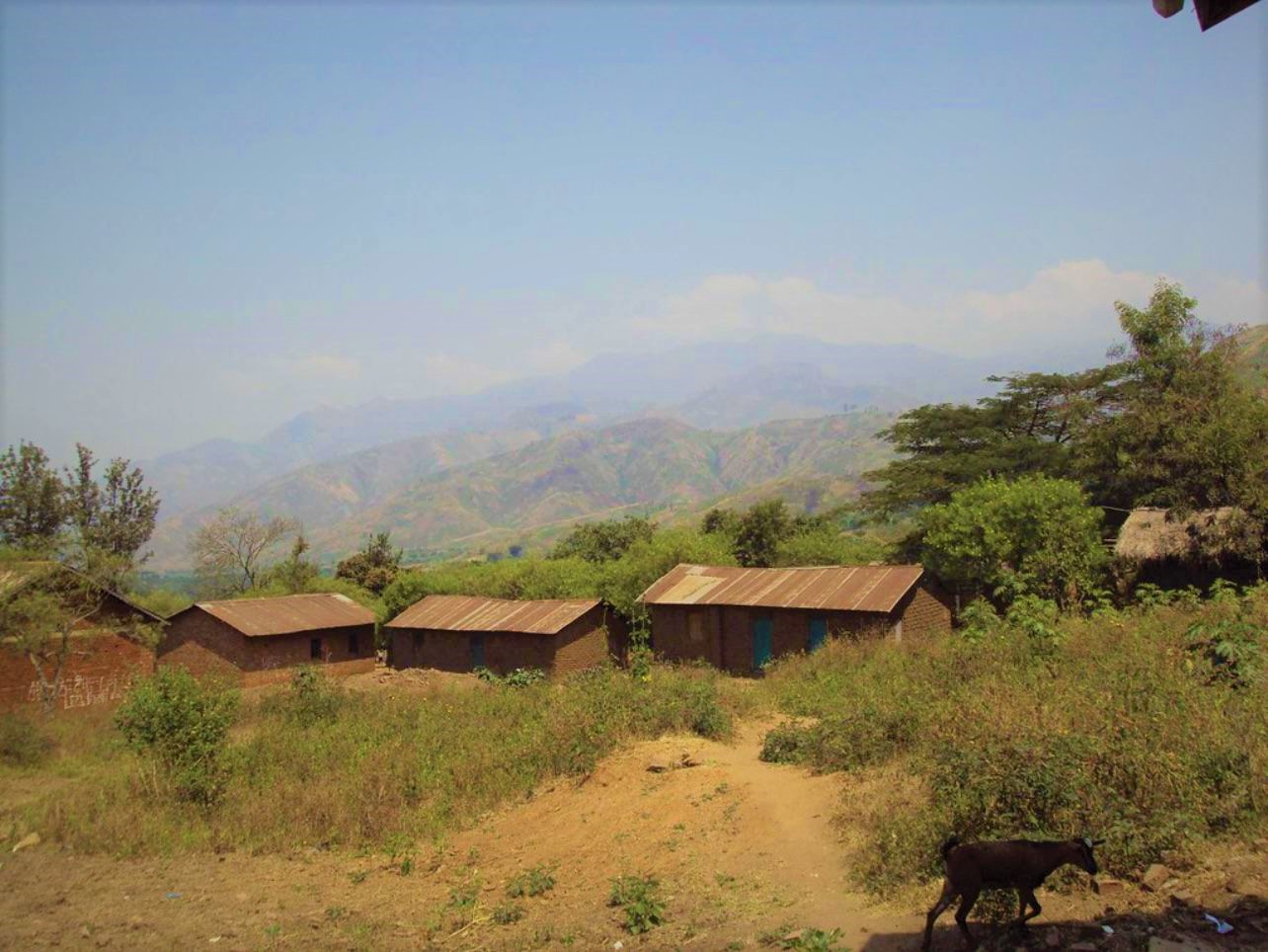
A view from Lubarika into the surrounding hillsides

Lubarika is a village situated in the hills and high plateaus of Itara/Luvungi groupement in the Bafuliiru Chiefdom, Uvira Territory, in the South Kivu Province of the eastern Democratic Republic of the Congo. It sits at an elevation of 969 meters above sea level and is near the villages of Murunga and Nyakagobe II. Lubarika is a predominantly agricultural region with large hectares used for subsistence agriculture. Agriculture is practiced by an extensive segment of the population. The products grown are mainly intended for domestic consumption and commercialization (with or without a minimum percentage of seed reserves). Moreover, fishing is carried out artisanally in Lake Tanganyika by the local population.

The village is occupied by the Fuliiru and Vira people, Bantu-speaking people who live on the high plateaus situated to the east of the DRC.

== History ==
Lubarika was traditionally inhabited by Fuliiru people. In the 1940s, during the Belgian colonial era, Lubarika was popular due to its mild climate and being a cotton-growing region based mainly on forced labour that spanned from Ruzizi Plain and reached as far as south, north and west areas of the Belgian Congo.

At the commencement of the First Congo War, on 18 October 1996, Lubarika was attacked by the AFDL (Alliance des Forces Démocratiques pour la Libération du Congo-Zaïre), the APR, and the FAB (Forces Armées Burundaises). Thousands of Rwandan refugees as well as Zairian civilians were killed in Lubarika when AFDL attacked Zaire from neighboring Uganda and Rwanda. Among these refugees were a large number of women and children, ex-FAR/Interahamwe soldiers, who had just been defeated, and political and administrative authorities who supervised the Rwandan Genocide. Many Rwandan refugees, as well as Zairian civilians, fled the village as AFDL troops were on a rampage of killing anyone in sight. Those who attempted entry into Kakumbukumbu, a village five kilometers from Lubarika, were captured and killed by AFDL troops.

After the massacres against Rwandan refugees and Zairian civilians during the First and Second Congo Wars, several articles and international academic research have been devoted to the mass violence against Rwandan refugees and Congolese civilians. These scholarly research and data led the UN High Commissioner for Human Rights to write and publish a report entitled "Mapping Report" on the "most serious violations of human rights and international humanitarian law committed within the territory of the Democratic Republic of the Congo between March 1993 and June 2003".
