= Kiliba =

Town in Democratic Republic of the Congo

Kiliba is a town in the Democratic Republic of the Congo (DRC), situated just north of the northern tip of Lake Tanganyika in the Uvira Territory of the South Kivu Province. It is approximately 17 km away from Bujumbura, the largest city and former capital of Burundi, and 25 km north of Uvira. The primary spoken language is Kifuliiru, although Kiswahili and French are also commonly spoken.

It is located at the base of the Mitumba Mountains (which lie to the west) in the Ruzizi Plain. It was once the site of the sugar cane mill of Sucraf-Sucki, the second largest and oldest sugar mill in the DRC. The factory was destroyed in the Second Congo War which started in 1998. The factory is currently under rehabilitation as from 2019.
