= Mutarule =

Village in Democratic Republic of the Congo

- Village
- Location within Democratic Republic of the Congo
- Coordinates: 2°59′3″S 29°5′35″E
- Country: Democratic Republic of the Congo
- Province: South Kivu
- Time zone: UTC+2:00 (CAT)

Mutarule is a village near Luberizi, in South Kivu, Democratic Republic of the Congo. It is noted for a number of violent incidents since the 2010s.

== History ==
In August 2013, eight residents of Mutarule were killed in an attack by unidentified armed men.

Mutarele was scene to the 2014 South Kivu attack in which 35 villagers were killed.

An explosion in Mutarule killed two people and injured 18 in 2025.
