= Luberizi =

Village in Democratic Republic of the Congo

- Village
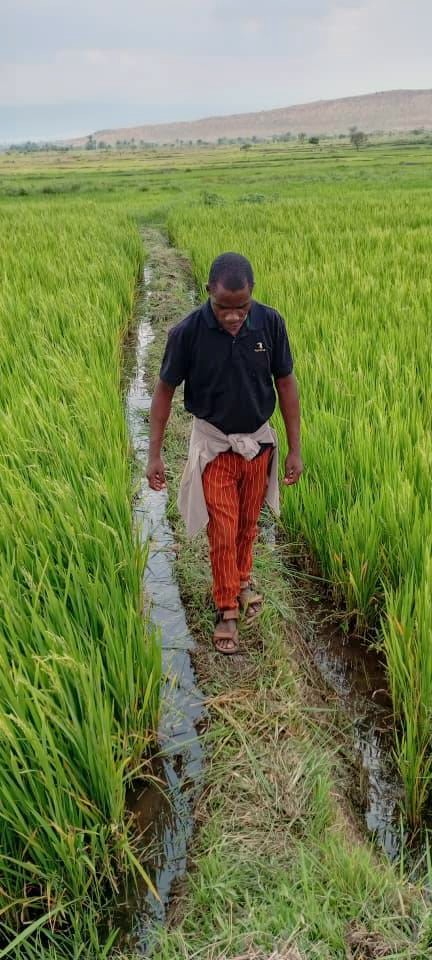
- Rice field in Luberizi

- Location within Democratic Republic of the Congo
- Coordinates: 2.976267°S 29.087816°E
- Country: Democratic Republic of the Congo
- Province: South Kivu
- Territory: Uvira
- Chiefdom: Bafuliiru
- Elevation: 957 m (3,140 ft)

Population
  - Total: 25,462
- Time zone: UTC+2:00 (CAT)

Luberizi is a village located in the Luvungi groupement within the Bafuliiru Chiefdom of Uvira Territory, South Kivu Province, in the eastern region of the Democratic Republic of the Congo. At an elevation of 957 meters, it has a local population of about 25,462. It sits astride the N5 road where it crosses the Luberizi River, nearly midway between Uvira to the south and Bukavu to the north. The village of Mutarule, the scene of the 2014 South Kivu attack, is located nearby.

== Known people ==
- Louis Bidalira, rebel leader
