= Uvira Territory =

Uvira
- Territory
- Location within Democratic Republic of the Congo
- Coordinates: 3.25°S 29.133°E
- Country: DR Congo
- Province: South Kivu

Area
  - Total: 3,146 km^{2} (1,215 sq mi)

Population (2020)
  - Total: 1,165,092
  - Density: 370.3/km^{2} (959.2/sq mi)
- Time zone: UTC+2 (CAT)

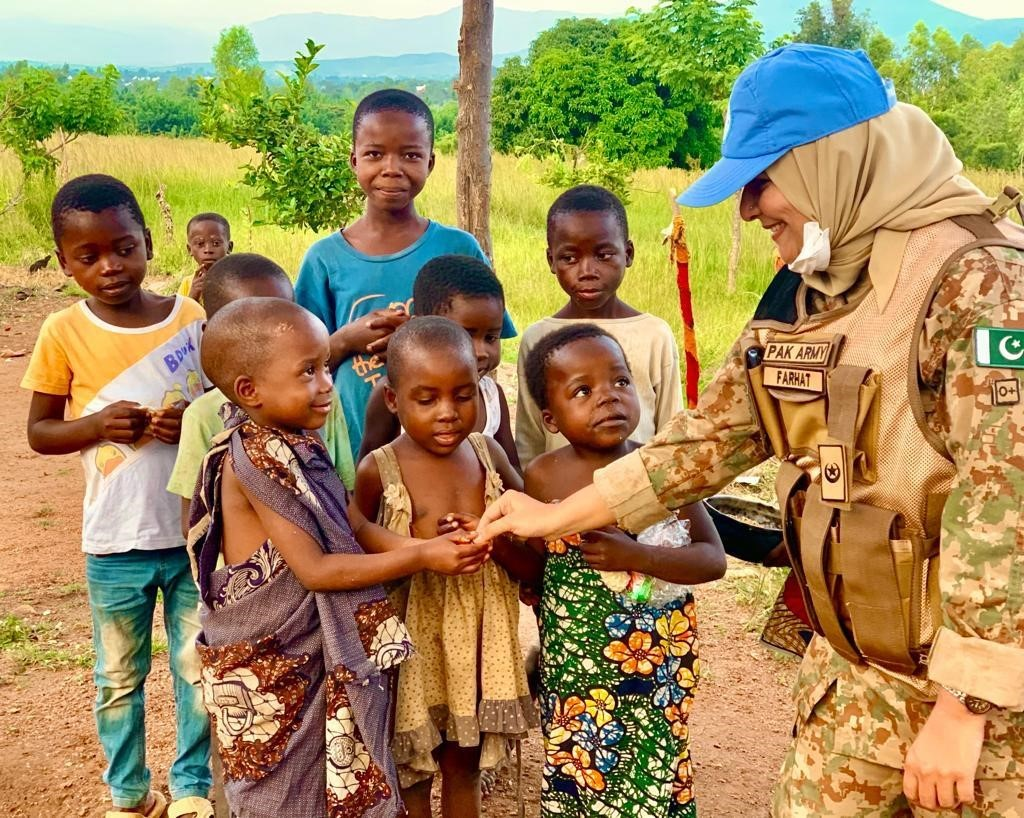
Children in Kigoma village, Uvira territory with a soldier from Pakistan in 2022

Uvira Territory is a territory in South Kivu, Democratic Republic of the Congo. It is bordered by Walungu Territory to the north, Mwenga Territory to the west, Fizi Territory to the south, and Burundi and Lake Tanganyika to the east.

The main road in the territory is the RN5, which connects to the city of Bukavu in the north and to Lubumbashi in the south.
