= Kigoma, Bafuliiru Chiefdom =

Groupement in Bafuliiru Chiefdom, DR Congo

Kigoma
- Grouping
- Groupement de Kigoma
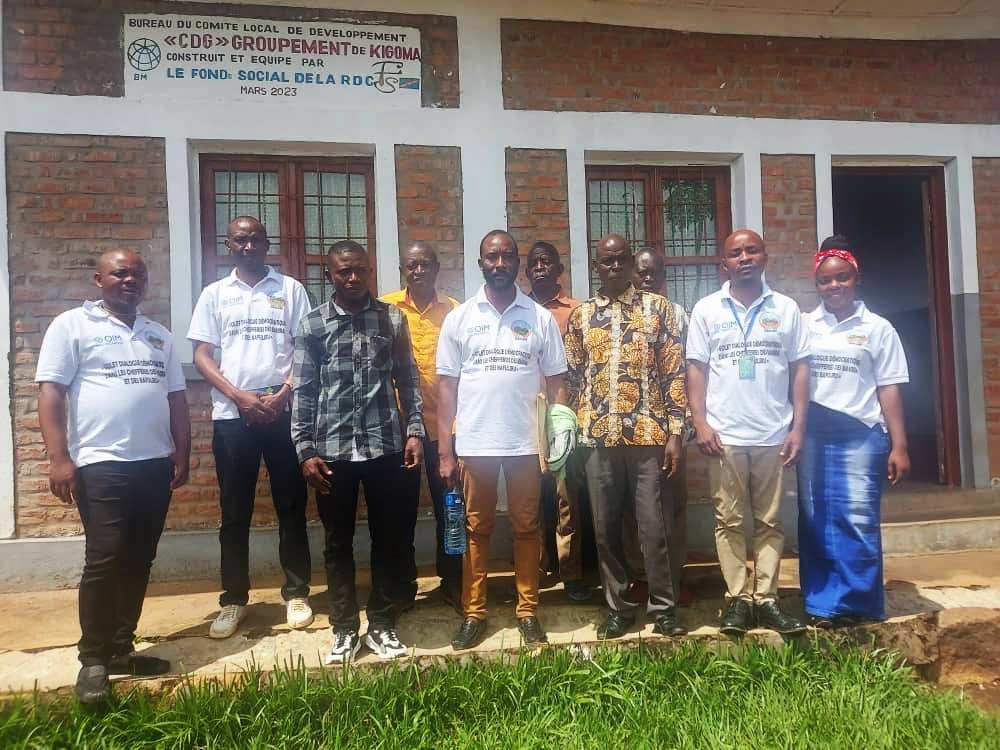
- The headquarters of the Kigoma groupement administration
- Country: Democratic Republic of the Congo
- Province: South Kivu
- Territory: Uvira
- Chiefdom: Bafuliiru
- Time zone: UTC+2 (CAT)
- Official language: French
- National language: Kiswahili

Kigoma is one of the four groupement of the Bafuliiru Chiefdom of Uvira Territory, South Kivu, Democratic Republic of the Congo. The local economy largely depends on subsistence agriculture, livestock rearing, and petty trade. The Bafuliiru make up the majority of the population, alongside smaller groups of Bavira, Banyindu, Barundi, and Banyamulenge.

The groupement faces ongoing security issues due to the ongoing Kivu conflict involving multiple armed groups, which often results in repeated clashes and forced displacement of civilians.

== Governance and administrative divisions ==
The Kigoma groupement is administered by a chef de groupement, who represents the mwami of the Bafuliiru Chiefdom. The mwami exercises customary authority over land. Customary and state authorities commonly collaborate, although disputes over land management and jurisdiction occasionally arise. The position of chef de groupement is hereditary. The chief manages local administration, customary justice, and community conflict resolution, assisted by a council of elders who advise on governance and uphold traditional norms. Minor judicial matters are handled locally, while serious cases are referred to the mwami.

Kigoma is subdivided into several villages, each of which is led by a chef de village, who represents the chef de groupement at the local level. Supporting this role are chefs de sous-village (sub-village chiefs) or chefs de quartier, responsible for administrative duties such as tax collection and regional governance. The role of chef de colline (hill chief) exists within the hierarchy; this position is considered a distinct chiefdom, appointed by the chef de localité, and involves customary rituals of respect, such as offering a goat and a jug of drink to acknowledge authority.

Villages of the Kigoma groupement:

| No. | Name | No. | Name |
|---|---|---|---|
| 1 | Bibangwa | 24 | Miduga |
| 2 | Bikenge | 25 | Kitembe |
| 3 | Kukanga | 26 | Mibere |
| 4 | Bushajaga | 27 | Kitija |
| 5 | Kahungwe | 28 | Muhanga |
| 6 | Butumba | 29 | Kabamba |
| 7 | Kabere | 30 | Mulenge |
| 8 | Karava | 31 | Kaduma |
| 9 | Kalengera | 32 | Mushojo |
| 10 | Kahololo | 33 | Masango |
| 11 | Kalimba | 34 | Kitoga |
| 12 | Karaguza | 35 | Mashuba |
| 13 | Kahungwe | 36 | Mulama |
| 14 | Kasheke | 37 | Kagaragara |
| 15 | Kiryama | 38 | Ndegu |
| 16 | Kanga | 39 | Rurambira |
| 17 | Kashagala | 40 | Rugeje |
| 18 | Kasenya | 41 | Rubuga |
| 19 | Kishugwe | 42 | Rusako |
| 20 | Kigoma | 43 | Sogoti |
| 21 | Lubembe | 44 | Taba |
| 22 | Kihinga | 45 | Kabunambo |
| 23 | Mangwa | | |

== Security and humanitarian situation ==
Violent unrest surged in August 2009 across the middle and high plateaus located west of the Ruzizi Plain in Uvira Territory. The assaults, attributed to Democratic Forces for the Liberation of Rwanda (FDLR), increasingly focused on attacking civilians and troops from the Armed Forces of the Democratic Republic of the Congo (FARDC). More than five ambushes were documented that month. On 3 August, one particularly deadly incident occurred when armed assailants ambushed a vehicle transporting traders and FARDC soldiers along the Rubanga–Kiringye-Nyamutiri route. The attack left one civilian dead and one soldier wounded, as the assailants looted belongings from those on board before being forced to retreat by FARDC soldiers who returned fire. Additional incidents involved ambushes on Operation Kimya II convoys near Bwegera and the death of an FARDC officer in Mulenge, in the high plateaus of Kigoma. In response to increasing attacks, Operation Kimya II deployed additional FARDC forces to secure affected areas and protect military personnel and civilians, as FDLR fighters and their families were reported regrouping in Igangu and Bibangwa/Kashengo in Kigoma. In the same month, concern grew in the highlands of Bijombo and Kigoma groupements as civil society leaders voiced growing concern over increasing ties between the FDLR and the FRF (Forces Républicaines Fédéralistes), a Banyamulenge-led militia headed by "Generals" Venant Bisogo and Michel Makanika Rukunda. FDLR fighters and their families, fleeing from FARDC offensives, had sought refuge in areas controlled by the FRF, where they were said to be cohabiting, interacting amicably, and possibly conducting joint patrols. The Kitoga market fell under their shared control and generated tax revenue, but rising insecurity forced residents to avoid it. According to Major Sylvain Ekenge, spokesperson for Operation Kimya II, the FARDC regarded both factions as a single adversary to be dealt with through coordinated force. In April 2010, two civilians were killed during clashes in Bijojo in Kigoma and Mwenga Territory between FARDC forces and Mai-Mai. One Mai-Mai member died, and two were wounded.

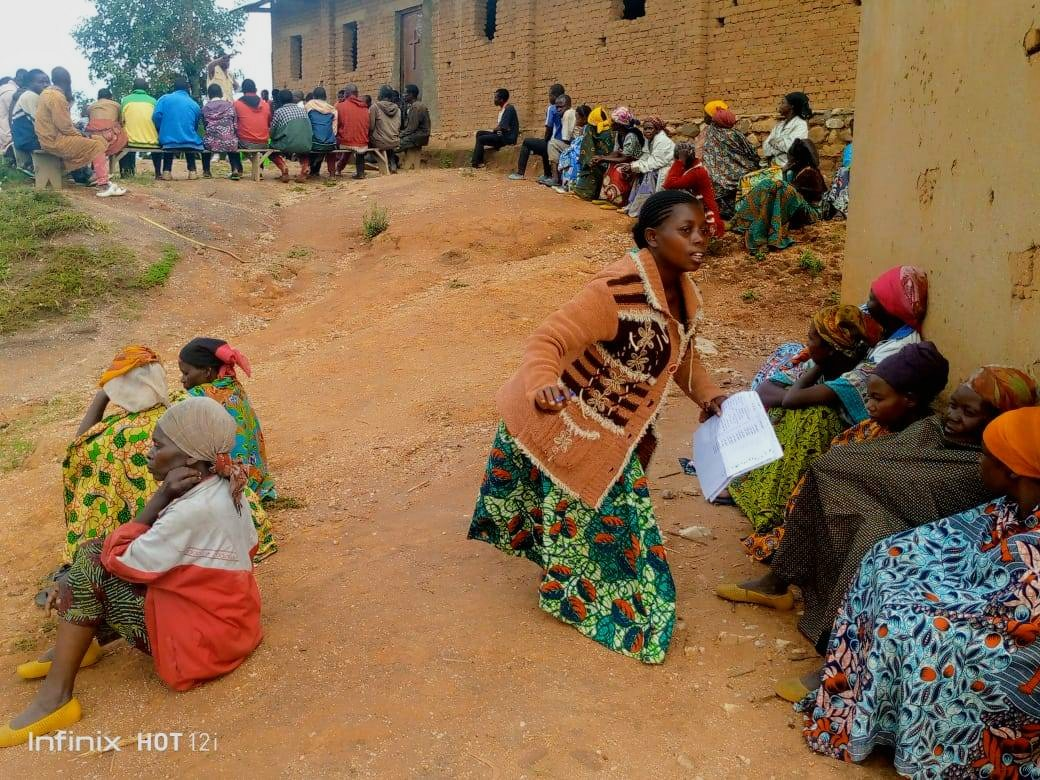
A mini intra-community dialogue in Mubere, Kigoma groupement

By May 2011, the FARDC had redeployed troops to the middle plateaus of Uvira Territory. Although local communities, particularly women at the Kageregere market, report feeling safer, threats persist in places like the Kiriama highlands, where FDLR fighters remain active. Although poor road infrastructure hampers military supply efforts, FARDC troops remain committed to their mission. The increased military presence in Mashuba and Bushagala helped reduce violence, with local leaders calling for ongoing cooperation between civilians and the military to sustain peace. In February 2014, unknown attackers stole 96 cows in the Ruzizi Plain. Additional livestock thefts were reported in the groupements of Kabunambo, Runingu, Kigoma, Lemera, as well as in Sange, while in Lemera, herders accused rebels from Burundi's National Liberation Front (FNL) of taking 17 cows from Namutiri. In late March 2017, the FARDC and MONUSCO forces began joint military operations in Kigoma to address growing insecurity, following incidents such as the ambush of civilians near Lubarika, the kidnapping of two truck drivers in Nyakabere, and the brief abduction of 16 farmers by suspected Burundian rebels in Kiliba Sugar Refinery. These operations resulted in the deaths of four militiamen. On 1 April, eight fighters led by Kivuwe Songa surrendered in the Bafuliiru Chiefdom highlands, turning in their weapons and ammunition. Songa stated they were weary of being pursued and expressed a desire to join the army or police. On 10 April 2018, FARDC forces killed Mai-Mai leader Espoir Karakara during a firefight in Rugeje, Kigoma. On 23 April, two of his group's fighters, including his younger brother, who had assumed leadership, were killed near Kigoma while seeking revenge. That same night, Mai-Mai militiamen also kidnapped several people in Mahungubwe village near Lemera, including Pastor Musavi Djuma of the 8th CEPAC (Communauté des Églises de Pentecôte en Afrique Centrale), reportedly taken by the Kihebe faction.

On 16 January 2019, heavy fighting broke out in Kabere between Burundian rebel groups, including FOREBU, RED-Tabara, and FNL, and pro-government Imbonerakure militia. The rebels were bombarded in their positions, leading to the deaths of at least 17 of their fighters, while one Imbonerakure was seriously injured. The conflict, which began in Kabere about 20 kilometers west of Sange, later extended to Mubere and Mulenge. Civilians who fled to Sange and Kigoma reported the presence of heavily armed individuals in Burundian military uniforms, believed to be Imbonerakure, seen in villages since 15 January. These militiamen had reportedly crossed the Ruzizi Plain with assistance from Mai-Mai Kijangala and moved into the middle plateau region, while the rebels were supported by Mai-Mai Kihebe. After being overpowered, the rebel coalition retreated to the Kiriama highlands. On 22 January, the coalition of RED-Tabara, FNL, and Mai-Mai Kihebe suffered another major defeat when Imbonerakure forces, joined by their Congolese Mai-Mai allies, reclaimed the positions lost between Kabere, Mubere, and Mulenge. After taking shelter in Kifuni village on 20 January following their loss in Mulenge, the rebels were again expelled on 22 January. According to FARDC sources from the 3304th Regiment, the rebels then fled deeper into a bamboo forest called Kitavuka Mbegere, located near the border of Uvira and Mwenga Territories. The 20 January fighting in Kihinga and Nabahuri led to five deaths, four rebels and one Mai-Mai, as well as one injured fighter, which then added to the growing number of displaced civilians in the area.

=== 2021–2022 clashes ===
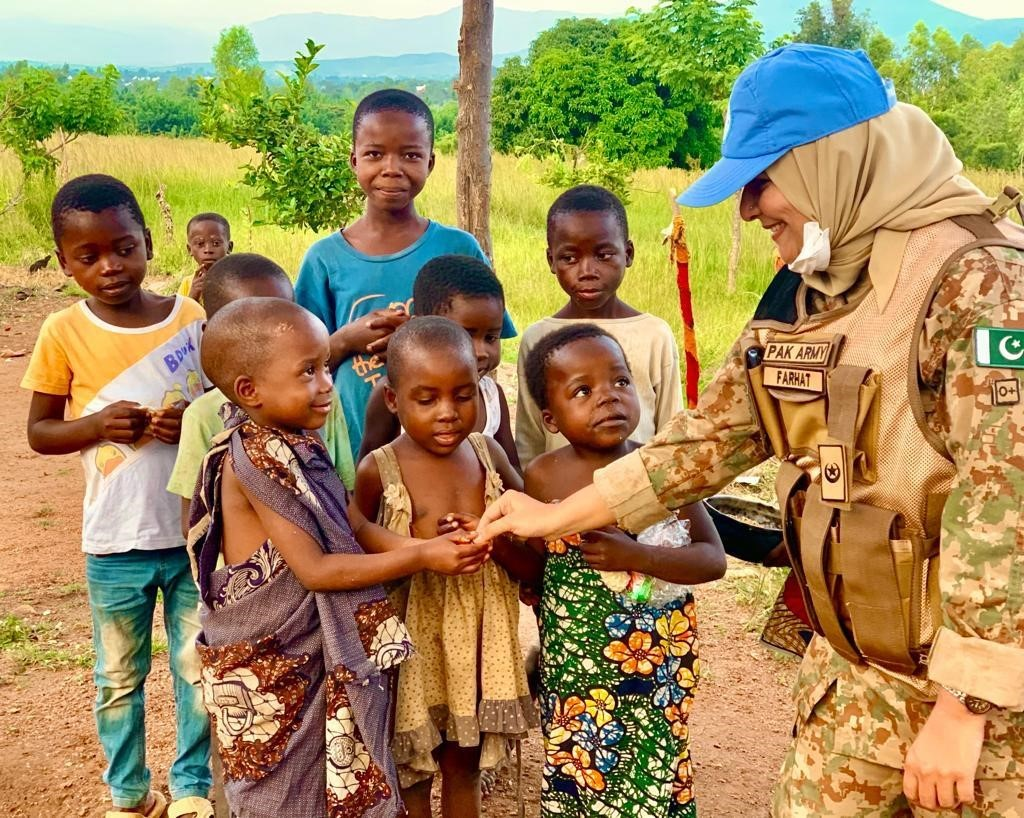
A female peacekeeper from the Pakistan Armed Forces contingent of MONUSCO interacts with children during a patrol in Kigoma groupement.

In April 2021, intense clashes broke out among armed groups in several villages of the Kigoma groupement, forcing nearly 24,000 people to flee their homes. Approximately 95% of those displaced were taken in by host families within the health areas of Lemera, Bwegera, Mubere, Ndegu, Mulenge, Bushuju, and Katala, while the remaining 5% found refuge in temporary collective centers such as schools and churches. These displacements occurred shortly after a previous influx of 13,224 people who had arrived between 16 and 21 March. Despite a brief period of relative calm in the Ruzizi Plain toward late March, insecurity continued, and by early May 2021, healthcare workers in Kahololo and Kitoga were receiving threats from unidentified armed actors, putting access to medical care for approximately 24,146 residents at risk. On 16 December, Mubere was attacked by armed men believed to be affiliated with a Mai-Mai faction. The assault was reportedly a reprisal following the group's defeat by the FARDC in clashes that had occurred in Kigoma on 11 December, during which three FARDC soldiers were reportedly killed and burned alive. The 16 December incursion led to extensive looting, physical assaults, and the displacement of about 277 households distributed across Mugule (85 households), Katala (41), Mulenge (58), and Kigoma Center (93). The following day, approximately 960 households fled from Kigoma toward Sange, prompted by threats from Mai-Mai groups accusing residents of collaborating with FARDC soldiers stationed in the area.

Renewed violence erupted on 16 April 2022, beginning in Mubere and rapidly spreading to nearby localities, including Kabere, Kalengera, Kanga, and Rugeje. The fighting displaced 7,987 people, representing 1,300 households, with 5,157 women and 2,830 men among them. Many sought refuge in Kahungwe, Kigoma Center, and Sange. The violence resulted in widespread destruction, as most homes in the affected areas, particularly Kabere, Kahinga, Kalengera, Kanga, Mubere, and Rugeje, were burned or destroyed, leaving families without shelter or basic possessions. Host communities were overwhelmed, with some families sheltering up to eight displaced people under one roof. Continued fighting between FARDC and local militias such as Kijangala and Imbonerakure deepened insecurity and humanitarian suffering. Humanitarian assessments revealed widespread property loss, looting of livestock, sexual and gender-based violence, forced marriages, family separations, and recruitment of minors by armed groups.

== Economy ==
The local economy is primarily based on agriculture, livestock farming, and small-scale trade. However, it has been paralyzed by insecurity, with farmers being unable to access rural areas for cultivation, leading to a decline in local food stocks and an increase in food insecurity.

== Infrastructure and public services ==
=== Water and sanitation ===
Access to water and sanitation remains one of the most pressing challenges in the Kigoma groupement, where most villages lack improved or potable water sources, and residents of Kigoma Center and Kahungwe rely on the Lungutu and Nakano Rivers. While the nearby rural commune of Sange benefits from water points constructed by Solidarité Paysanne and the Agency for Technical Cooperation and Development (ACTED), these facilities are insufficient to meet the needs of the entire population, including displaced persons. Meanwhile, poor waste management, with household trash dumped in open areas, worsens hygiene and sanitation conditions.

=== Education ===
Kigoma's education system aligns with the national framework of the Democratic Republic of the Congo and is organized in three main stages. Primary education lasts six years and ends with the Certificat d'Études Primaires (CEP). Secondary education also spans six years, concluding with the Diplôme d'État, and is typically divided into various tracks such as general humanities, technical education, commercial subjects, and vocational training. Higher education is structured in tiers: the Graduat (three years), followed by the Licence (two additional years), and then postgraduate programs such as the Diplôme d'Études Approfondies (DEA) or a doctorate. While there are no universities in Kigoma itself, residents have access to higher education institutions in the nearby city of Uvira, including the Université Notre Dame de Tanganyika (UNDT) and four accredited instituts supérieurs.
