= Kidote =

- Village
- Village Kidote
- Country: Democratic Republic of the Congo
- Province: South Kivu
- Territory: Uvira
- Chiefdom: Bafuliiru
- Grouping: Lemera
- Time zone: UTC+2 (CAT)

Kidote is a small village situated in the middle plateau of Lemera groupement in Bafuliiru Chiefdom, Uvira Territory, South Kivu, Democratic Republic of the Congo. It also serves as a camp for Congolese Internally Displaced People (IDPs) from various regions of Bwegera..

== History ==
Kidote has long been inhabited mainly by the Fuliiru people. A smaller number of Vira people also live there.

During the early phase of the First Congo War, Kidote was used as a training camp by the Alliance of Democratic Forces for the Liberation of Congo (AFDL). On 6 October 1996, the village was attacked by AFDL forces, which led to the deaths of more than 50 people, most of whom were civilians. Some victims were killed by shrapnel from weapons, while others were reportedly forced to dig mass graves before being executed and buried there.

=== Security problems ===
For decades, the region remained plagued by persistent insecurity. This insecurity has been caused by armed conflict, fighting between different armed groups, and inter-communal violence. In the first months of 2022, the re-emergence of the March 23 Movement forced many people from surrounding conflict zones to seek refuge in Kidote. The Espace Amis d'Enfance (EAE), a local non-governmental organization, received nearly one hundred displaced children who were seeking safety and support.
