= Bafuliiru Chiefdom =

Chiefdom in Uvira Territory, South Kivu

- Chiefdom
- Chefferie de Bafuliiru
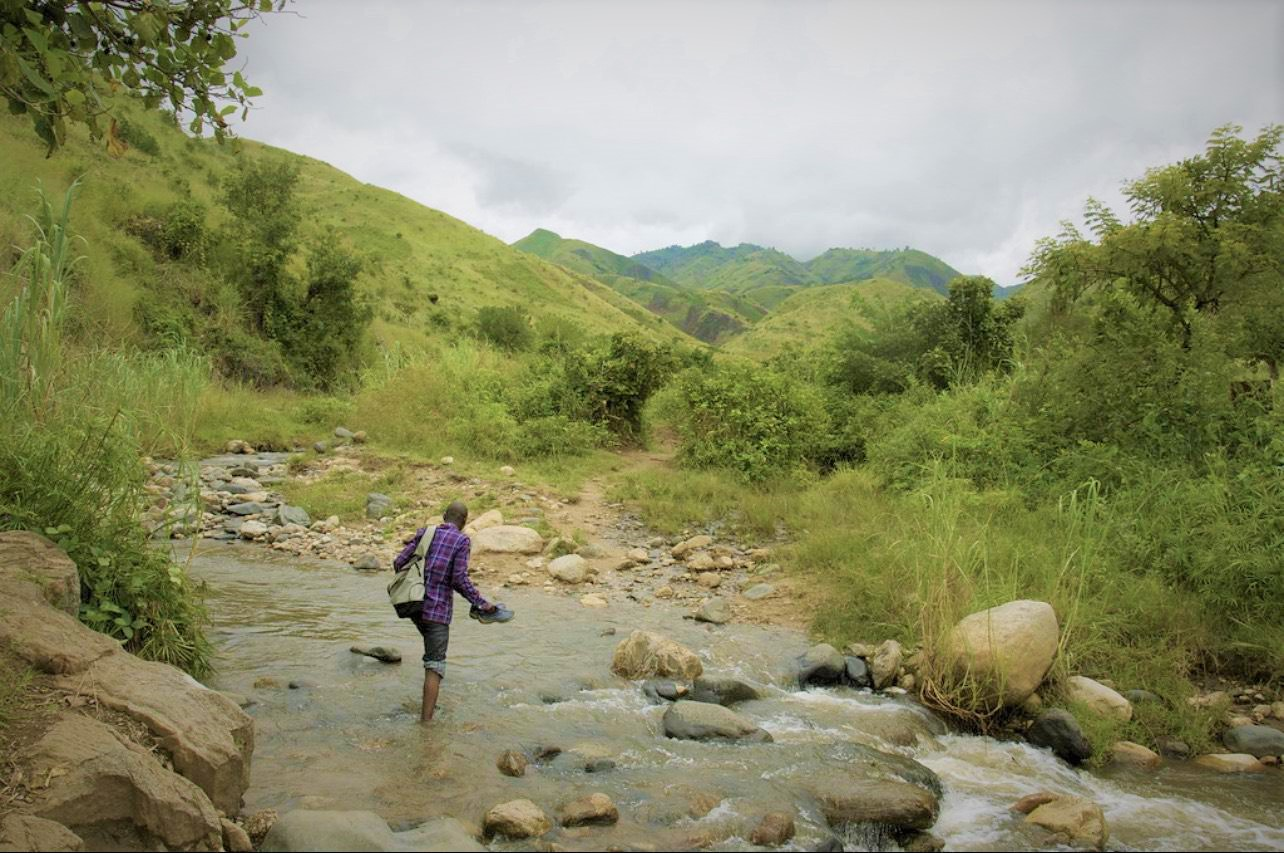
- Runingu River in the middle plateau of Runingu
- Country: Democratic Republic of the Congo
- Province: South Kivu
- Territory: Uvira
- Chief town: Lemera

Government
  - Mwami: Adam Ndare III Simba Kalingishi

Area
  - Total: 1,568.27 km^{2} (605.51 sq mi)
- Time zone: UTC+2 (CAT)
- Official language: French
- National language: Kiswahili

The Bafuliiru Chiefdom (French: Chefferie de Bafuliiru), is a chiefdom in Uvira Territory, South Kivu, in the eastern region of the Democratic Republic of the Congo. Covering an area of 1,568.27 square kilometers, it is the largest administrative entity in Uvira Territory, often considered akin to a separate territory due to its size. The chiefdom was established in 1928, alongside the Bavira Chiefdom and the Ruzizi Plain Chiefdom, as part of the reorganization of Uvira Territory during the colonial era.

The Bafuliiru Chiefdom is predominantly inhabited by the Fuliru people, with Banyindu, Banyamulenge, and Batwa communities in the Plateaux and a sizable Shi population in the Itara–Luvungi groupement. The chiefdom is subdivided into five groupements (groupings), which are then subdivided into villages.

== Geography ==
=== Relief and hydrology ===
The chiefdom's topography is characterized by plains and plateaus. Its eastern section includes Luvungi, Lubarika, Katogota, Kiliba, Runingu and Kawizi, which form part of the Ruzizi Plain. Elevations range from 773 to 1,000 meters above sea level. Sandy soils in the plain support groundnut and cotton cultivation, particularly around Luvungi, Lubarika and Luberizi.

The chiefdom's two principal plateau areas are the Moyen Plateau (Middle Plateau) and the Haut Plateau (High Plateau). The Moyen Plateau extends from Luvungi to Mulenge, with elevations ranging from 100 to 1,800 meters. Settlements include Namutiri, Ndolera, Bulaga, Langala, Bushokw, Bushuju, Butole, Lemera, Bwesho and Katala. The plateau supports the cultivation of cassava, coffee, bananas, beans and, in some areas, maize.

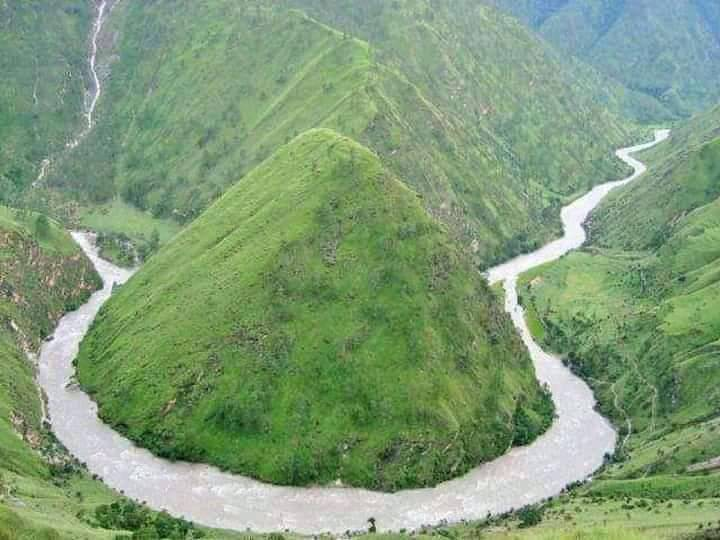
The Ruzizi River originates in Lake Kivu and flows into Lake Tanganyika, passing through several regions, including some of the most well-known areas of South Kivu. This image shows the river as it passes through Luvungi, in the Bafuliiru Chiefdom, within the Ruzizi Plain.

The Haut Plateau forms part of the Mitumba mountain range and contains peaks exceeding 3,000 meters. It also forms a watershed separating the drainage systems of the Ulindi and Elila rivers from those flowing towards the Ruzizi River and Lake Tanganyika. Following his visit to the area from 1 July to 13 September 1945, Burnotte described the Itombwe region as an extensive grassland and plateau, rising to approximately 3,000 meters in the east and descending westward towards the source of the Fuliru mwami's authority. Villages in this area include Lubuga, Bijojo, Kyanzovu, Muhanga, Kagabwe and Rurambo. Researcher Jérôme Katongo Kishamata argues that these villages, predominantly inhabited by people of Rwandan origin, have often been difficult for the mwami to govern. He attributes their resistance to chiefly authority, including failure to report to the mwami, partly to their distance from Lemera, approximately 250 km away. Katongo also argues that the Haut Plateau's terrain and the limited reach of chiefly authority facilitate armed resistance. The refusal to participate in the scientific census is cited as an example of resistance to chiefly authority. The Haut Plateau also supports the cultivation of maize and potatoes, staple foods for the local population, in part because of its cool climate.

The chiefdom's river system supports hydroelectric power generation and agricultural activities, particularly irrigation. The Butole hydroelectric dam on the Leza River supplies electricity to Lemera. The Lubumba power station generates electricity for Kiringye and formerly supplied the village's groundnut oil processing plant.

The Munyovwe River supports local agriculture and receives water from the Leza and Lubumba rivers before joining the Ruzizi River through the Luvubu. The Namutiri dam diverts water from the Munyovwe River to irrigate fields in Kiringye and Bwegera, where sorghum and groundnuts are cultivated. The river also supports rice cultivation in Kiringye and Luvungi, while local rice and groundnut production, in turn, sustains Kiringye's processing industry.

=== Climate ===
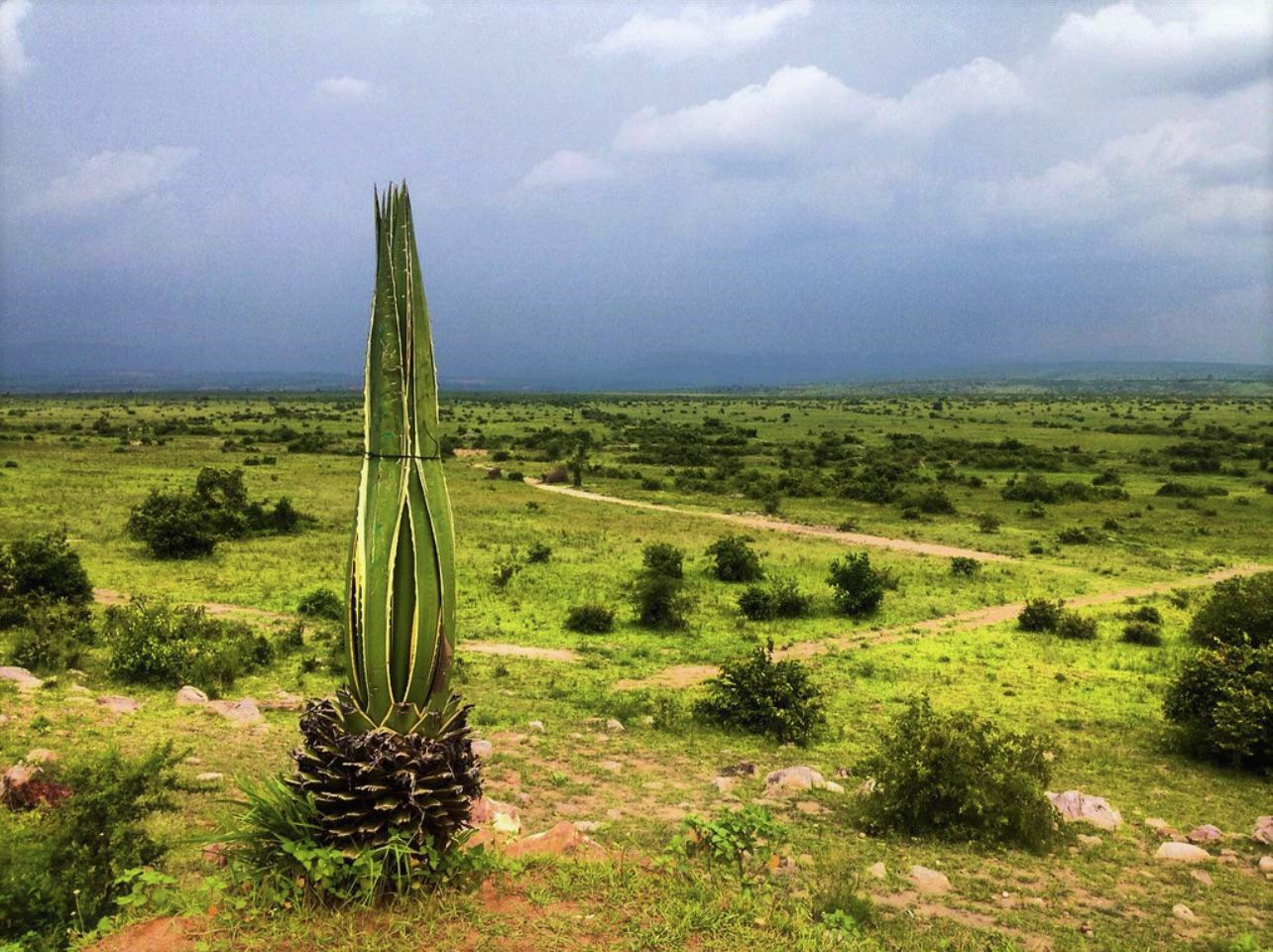
View of grassland in Butaho in the Ruzizi Plain

The climate varies with elevation between the semi-arid Ruzizi Plain and the surrounding plateaus. On the plain, monthly rainfall falls below 50 mm from June to September, average temperatures reach 22.5°C, and daily maxima can hit 35.5°C late in the dry season. Local atmospheric processes and wind patterns along the plain and Lake Tanganyika also shape conditions. The plateaus are cooler and generally wetter, with temperatures declining with altitude, although lapse rates vary across the Hauts Plateaux. Recorded temperatures range from 24°C at 1,000 meters to 12°C at 3,000 meters.

These altitudinal climatic contrasts shape local soils and vegetation. Recurrent drought has degraded the Ruzizi Plain's shrub savanna, while the wetter Hauts Plateaux support wooded savanna, gallery forests, bamboo groves and dense equatorial forest. Between Namutiri and Katala, the chiefdom experiences a transitional, relatively humid climate. This area supports the cultivation of cassava, coffee and beans. On the Haut Plateau, colder conditions and rugged terrain constrain accessibility, potentially favoring armed groups familiar with the landscape.

=== Administrative division ===
The Bafuliiru Chiefdom is a deconcentrated territorial entities (entités territoriales déconcentrées, ETD) under the Democratic Republic of the Congo's 2006 Constitution. The mwami holds both customary and modern authority, represents the provincial executive, and oversees local development. The chiefdom is divided into groupements (groupings), each led by a chef de groupement who represents the mwami directly. Each groupement is also divided into villages, governed by village chiefs who report to their groupement chiefs.

The Muhungu groupement consists of the following villages:

- Kabondola
- Kagunga
- Kaholwa
- Kalemba
- Kasheke
- Kaluzi
- Kazimwe
- Kibumbu
- Kasanga
- Kihanda
- Mukololo
- Lugwaja
- Masango
- Muzinda
- Muhungu
- Namukanga
- Kiriba
- Butaho
- Kawizi

The Kigoma groupement consists of the following villages:

- Bibangwa
- Bikenge
- Kukanga
- Bushajaga
- Kahungwe
- Butumba
- Kabere
- Karava
- Kalengera
- Kahololo
- Kalimba
- Karaguza
- Kahungwe
- Kasheke
- Kiryama
- Kanga
- Kashagala
- Kasenya
- Kishugwe
- Kigoma
- Lubembe
- Kihinga
- Mangwa
- Miduga
- Kitembe
- Mibere
- Kitija
- Muhanga
- Kabamba
- Mulenge
- Kaduma
- Mushojo
- Masango
- Kitoga
- Mashuba
- Mulama
- Kagaragara
- Ndegu
- Rurambira
- Rugeje
- Rubuga
- Rusako
- Sogoti
- Taba
- Kabunambo

The Runingu groupement consists of the following villages:

- Katembo
- Kashatu
- Ruhito
- Ruhuha
- Namuziba
- Kasambura
- Katwenge
- Bulindwe
- Narumoka
- Kalindwe

The Itara-Luvungi groupement consists of the following villages:

- Bwegera
- Lubarika
- Kakamba
- Murunga
- Ndolera
- Katogota
- Luberizi
- Bulaga
- Luburule
- Bideka

The Lemera groupement consists of the following villages:

- Kiringye
- Kidote
- Langala
- Bwesho
- Mahungu or Mahungubwe
- Narunanga
- Namutiri
- Lungutu
- Kahanda
- Kigurwe
- Ndunda

== History ==
=== Origin and political organization ===
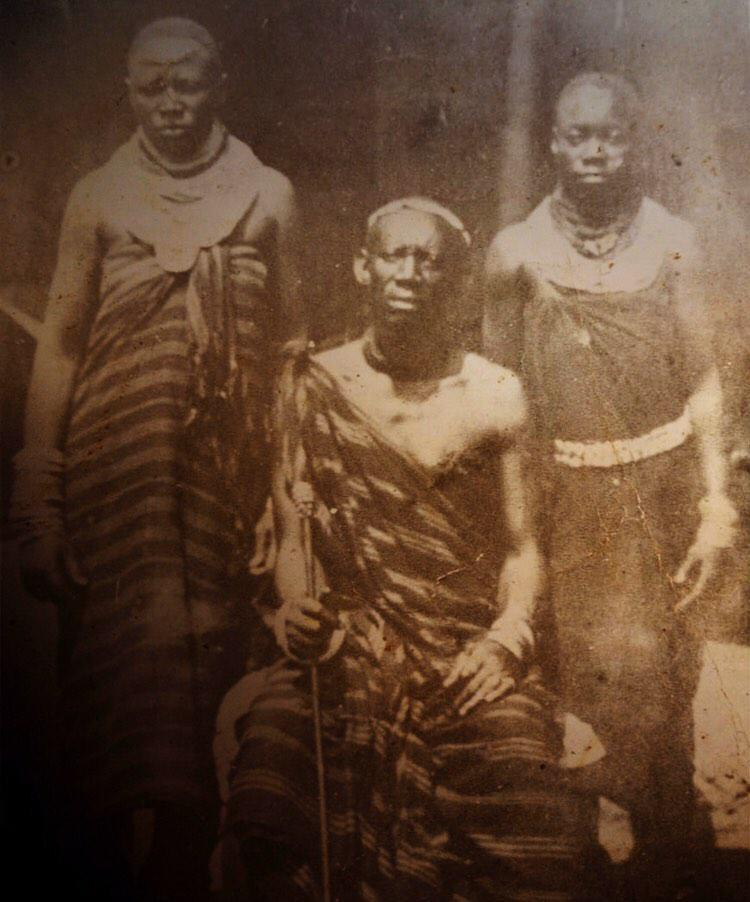
Mwami Nyamugira Mukogabwe II of Bafuliiru Chiefdom in Nia Magira (Lemera), Belgian Congo, circa 1925

The chiefdom traces its origins to the migration and settlement of the Bahamba clan of the Fuliiru people, led by mwami Kahamba Kalingishi. According to Alfred Moeller de Laddersous, the Bahamba migrated from present-day Lwindi Chiefdom under mwami Kikanwe and settled in the uninhabited area known as "Bufuliro". Over time, the Bahamba adopted the name Bafuliru as a marker of their evolving identity. The chronology of their arrival remains a subject of scholarly debate, with Belgian colonial records dating it to the 16th century, while Congolese historians Kingwengwe Mupe and Bosco Muchukiwa Rukakiza suggest the 17th century.

Other narratives describe a broader migration involving Fuliru and the Vira people from the northeast, potentially passing through Maniema before settling in Uvira Territory. Led by an ancestral figure named Nalwindi, the group split into two: the Bafuliru, under Kahamba Kalingishi, established themselves in the highlands of Lemera groupement, while the Vira, under Kirungu, settled on Munanira's peak and expanded into the lowlands. Bavira's oral traditions emphasize distinctions between the two groups, tracing the Bafuliru's origins to the north and the Bavira's to the south near Katanga.

Governance within the Bafuliiru Chiefdom was historically decentralized, characterized by the presence of multiple bami (chiefs). According to Congolese historian Jacques Depelchin, both "Buvira" (modern-day Bavira Chiefdom) and "Bufuliro" (Bafuliru Chiefdom) maintained this polycentric governance, devoid of a singular paramount mwami. When colonial authorities began organizing the region between 1895 and 1920, they placed particular emphasis on the institution of mwamiship. This practice was emerging among the Fuliiru and the Vira. According to research by Daniel P. Biebuyck, the term mwami, used across several Bantu-speaking populations of eastern Democratic Republic of the Congo, including the Fuliiru, Vira, Bembe, Lega, Shi, Havu, Nyindu, and others, designates office holders and incumbents of social or political authority. In common usage, mwami refers to a monarch or paramount chief. Biebuyck suggested that the word derived from bwami, a term particularly widespread among the Lega. While mwami denotes the ruler himself, bwami refers to the capacity to acquire the necessary knowledge and attributes required for leadership.

This capacity was expressed through symbolic regalia, most notably a cap made of leopard skin and decorated with cowrie shells, a leopard's tooth, eagle claws and beak, and medicinal plants. A mwami could not wear this cap until he had undergone initiation. The cap, referred to interchangeably as ishungwe or lushembe, was divided symbolically into two parts: ishungwe likely associated with the lower section, and lushembe with the upper. Among both the Fuliiru and Vira, initiation was conducted by representatives from specific clans. The Vira drew from seven clans, while the Fuliiru relied on three. Each representative had a precise responsibility. For instance, members of the Banyakatanda clan were tasked with overseeing the burial of a deceased mwami: preparing the body, wrapping it in a cowhide, and placing it on an elevated wooden frame above a fire. These representatives, called banjoga (in Kifuliiru) or baluvi (in Kivira), were also responsible for designating the successor to the throne. Although banjoga and baluvi exercised considerable influence in succession matters, they did not have direct control over the mwami himself. The clans from which they were drawn were said to be among the first to settle in the region.

=== Establishment ===
The independent political tradition persisted even as colonial authorities began delineating ethnic boundaries in 1907, which extended along Lake Tanganyika and the Ruzizi Plain, occasionally overlapping with Bavira territories. Buvira and Bufuliiru consisted of multiple bami. The colonial administration's arrival led to efforts to centralize authority, establishing a system recognizing a single mwami for the Vira, one for the Fuliiru, and one for the Barundi immigrants. This consolidation was aided by the fact that all Fuliiru bami belonged to the Bahamba clan. Mwami Luhama, a key figure in Bafuliru history, consolidated the Bahamba dynasty's power by apportioning his domain among his three sons: Nyamugira, who governed from Moira to the Munyovwe River; Mutahonga, who controlled the area between the Munyovwe and Kise Rivers, including the eastern slopes of the Ruzizi Valley; and Lusagara, who oversaw the mountainous regions. This strategic division ensured stability while maintaining centralized authority within the family, with leadership passing from father to eldest son. The chiefdom also assimilated other clans, notably the Bazige, whose autonomous chiefdom based in the present-day Muhungu groupement under Chief Kalunga, son of Mukobesi, was subsumed following their defeat by Mahina Mukogabwe II, a Bafuliru ruler who reigned from 1914 to 1927. Over time, Bazige adopted Kifuliiru and merged into Bafuliru society through intermarriage and economic exchanges, ultimately recognizing Mukogabwe as their mwami. Meanwhile, the Balunga clan aligned with the Bavira, forming a unique faction that did not embrace the Bafuliru's conventional leadership structures.

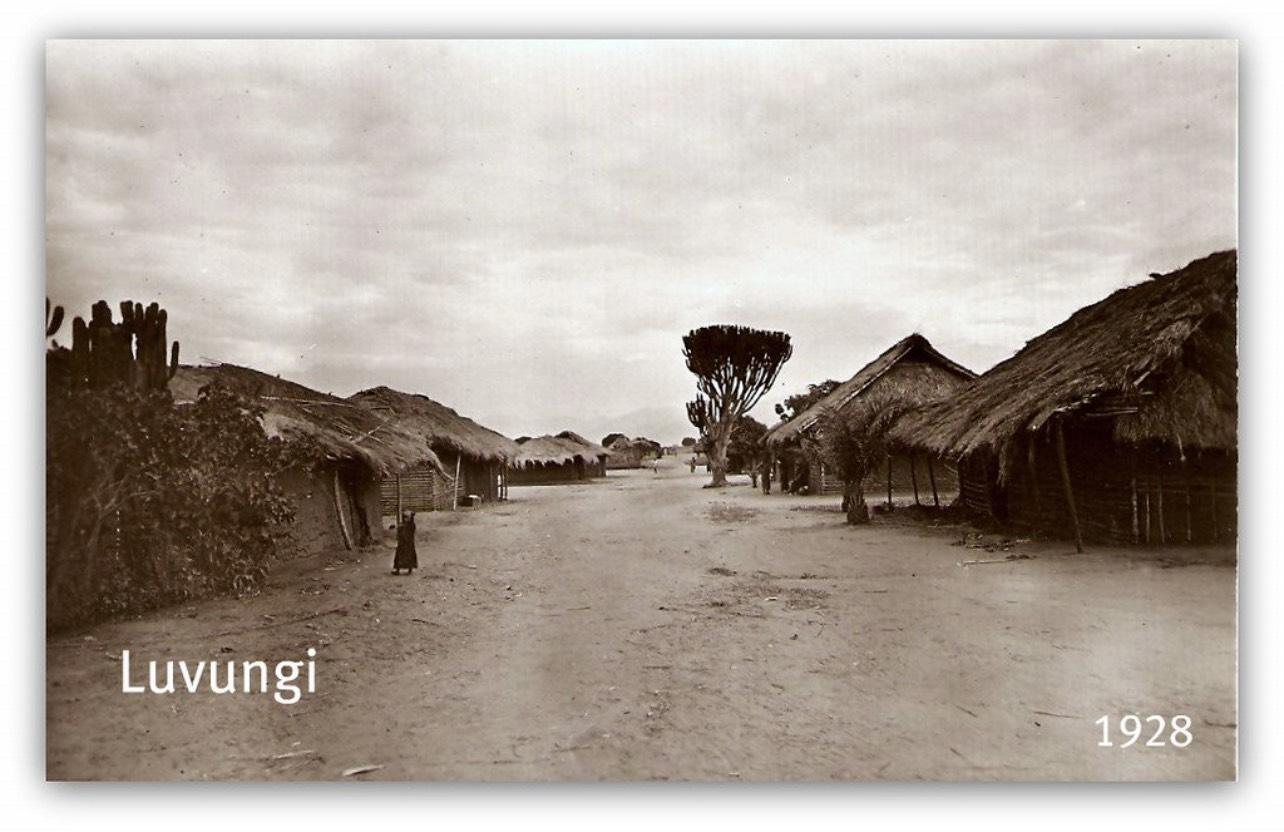
Itara-Luvungi in 1928

On 18 August 1928, the Bafuliru Chiefdom was officially constituted as part of the newly formed Uvira Territory, alongside the Bavira and Ruzizi Plain Chiefdoms, through an edict issued by the Chef de Division des Districts (C.D.D.) of the Kivu region. Fuliru historian Kingwengwe Mupe notes that Chief Matakambo, the son of Mahina Mukogabwe and grandson of Nyamugira I, the first Bahamba leader, received his official appointment on 19 March 1933. Despite its official establishment, the vast size of the chiefdom posed challenges in defining its precise boundaries. Colonial records from the Belgian Congo indicate that the geographical limits of the Bafuliiru Chiefdom were finalized on the same date as Matakambo's appointment in 1933:

- To the east: The Ruzizi River up to its confluence with the Luvubu, then from the Luvubu to Kalinda. From Kalinda, the boundary follows the mountain range leading to Ravine Mize, and from there, it follows the Costermansville Road (Bukavu) to Kawizi, including the Kanomo River. The boundary extends to the mouth of the Kanomo River where it meets the great Musondjo.
- To the south: From the confluence of Musondjo and Kamono, a line is drawn towards Mount Ngongwa, then from the source of the small Musondjo to its mouth where it joins the big Musondjo. The boundary continues along the great Musondjo until it meets the Lwindi River.
- To the west: From Lwindi, the boundary extends to the foot of Mount Lutandala, encompassing the valley between the Matiazo and Bihimvu Mountains. It then follows the course of the Kalongofya stream parallel to Mount Kaya. From there, it proceeds along the eastern slope of Mount Kaya to the source of the Kinwalangazi River, and finally, it follows the Kinwalangazi River until its confluence with the Luvubu. The boundary extends from the source of the Luvubu River to the source of the Kabundji River, which eventually joins the Luvimbi River at its mouth.

These delineations helped establish the territorial extent of the Bafuliru Chiefdom within the region. Nyamugira, another descendant of Mahina Mukogabwe, was appointed chief on 4 March 1940, consolidating Bahamba leadership over the chiefdom. While many sources credit the Bahamba with founding the Bafuliru Chiefdom, others suggest they supplanted the Balemera clan to establish their dominance. Kingwengwe Mupe contends that the Bahamba clan displaced or possibly overthrew the Balemera clan to assert control over the chiefdom. The Balemera clan, believed to be the region's original inhabitants, had strong ancestral ties to the area, with their stronghold in Lemera groupement—a location regarded as the heartland of their domain.

== Economy ==
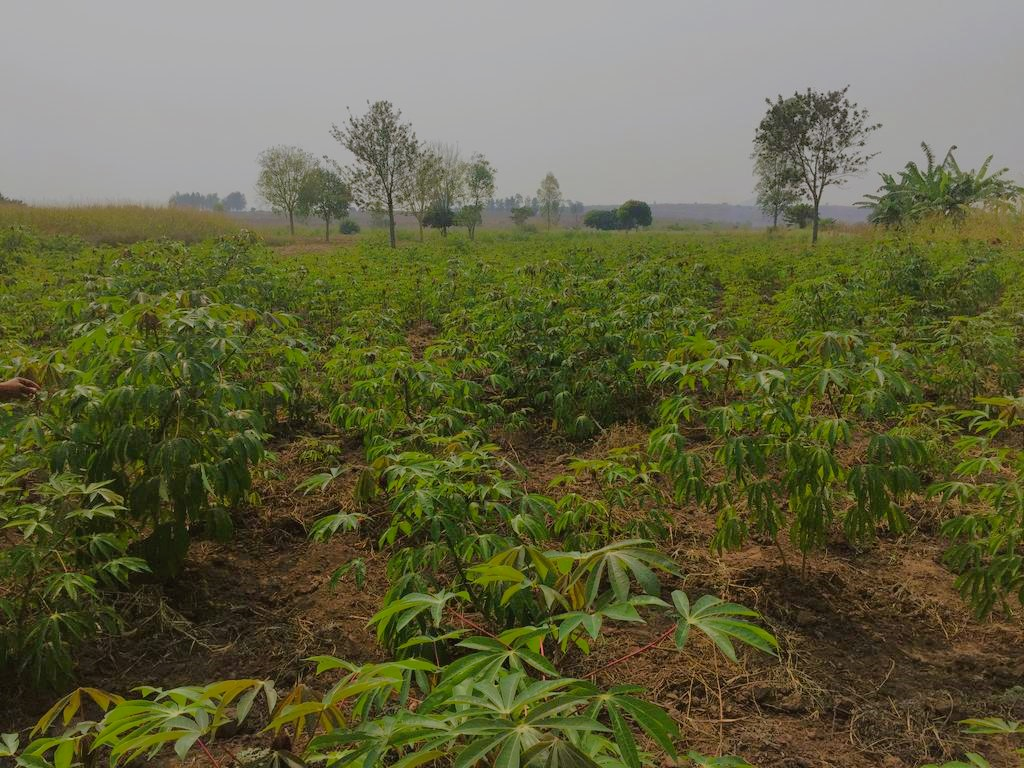
Cassava production in Katogota

Subsistence agriculture is the chiefdom's primary economic activity, with the surrounding fertile lands supporting the cultivation of a variety of crops such as cassava, beans, peanuts, coffee, banana, rice, and maize. The region also grows sorghum, wheat, and soybeans, along with various fruit trees, including orange, mango, guava, and avocado.

Cassava is among the most prominent agricultural commodities in the chiefdom areas of Ruzizi Plain and the Bafuliru Chiefdom. According to Bafuliiru folklore, cassava was introduced to the region during their migration from Lwindi Chiefdom, and it continues to serve as a vital food source. Banana cultivation is widespread throughout the Bafuliiru Chiefdom, serving both as a food crop and a raw material for producing Kasigisi, a fermented beverage made from bananas and sorghum.

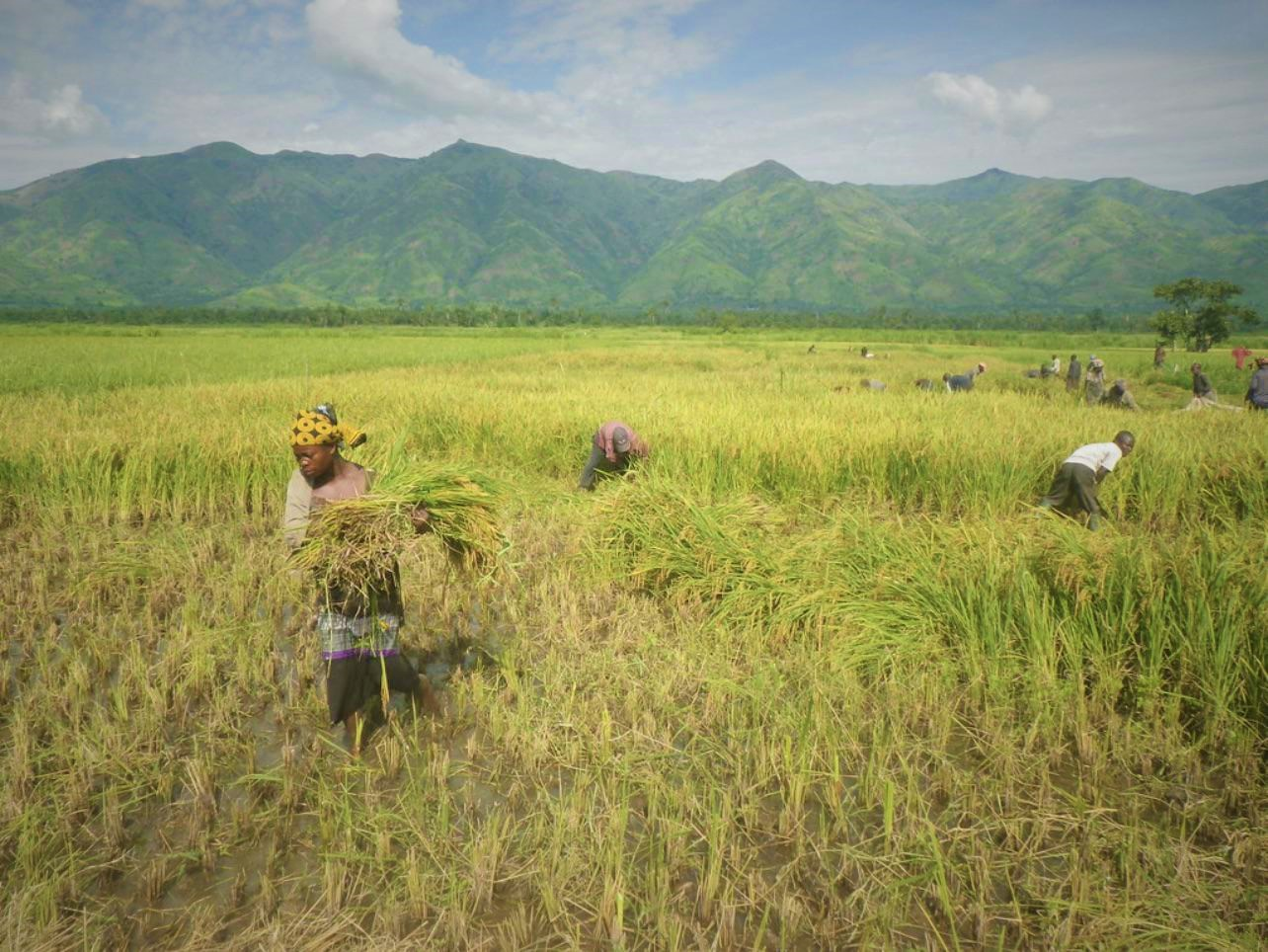
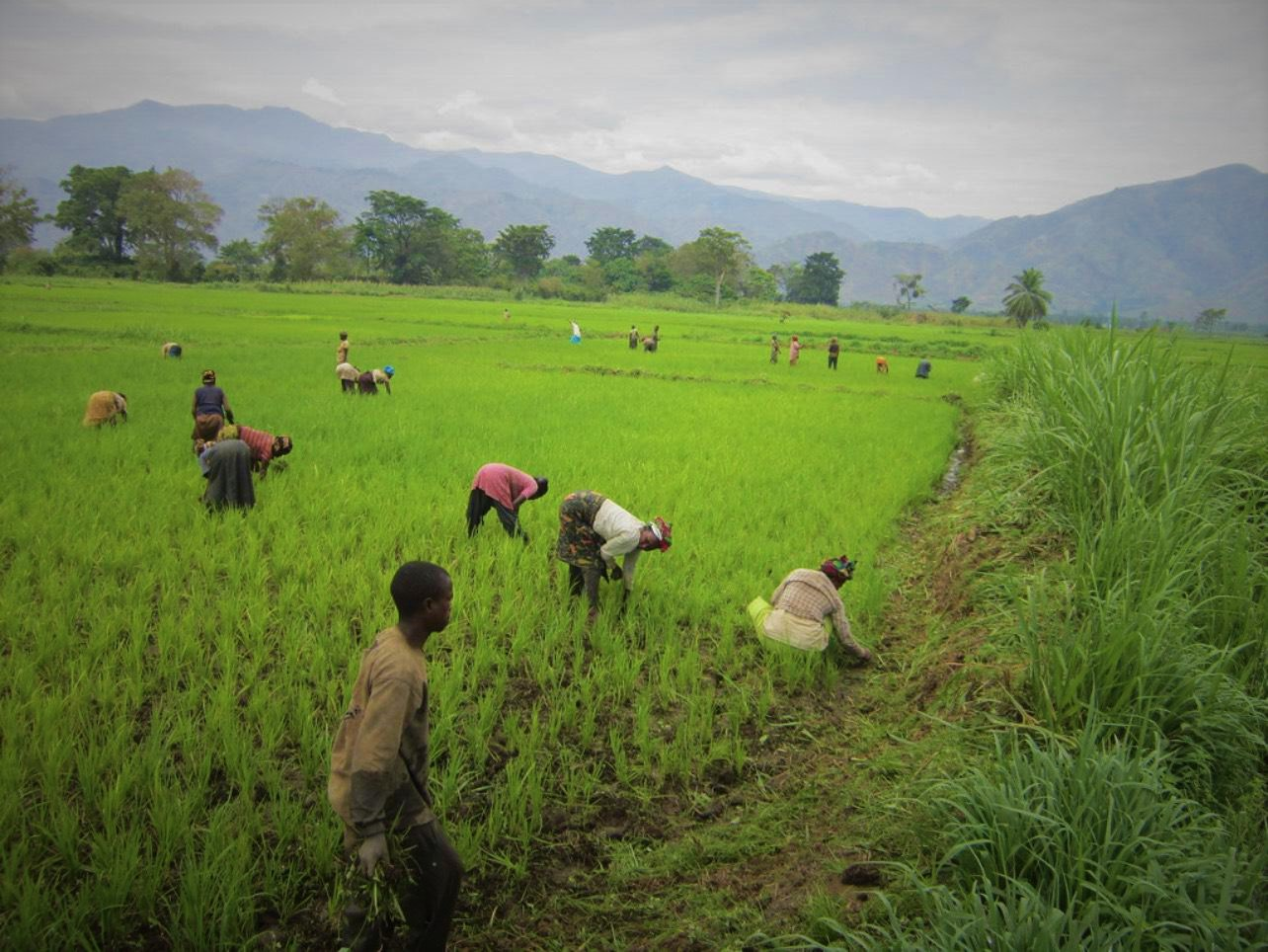
Rice cultivation in the Ruzizi Plain, Uvira Territory

Rice production, specifically varieties such as IR5, L9, and IRON 282, is also prominent, although it is more often cultivated as a cash crop. Rice is primarily grown at the CEP Kabwe, Kaliri, and the Cenre Developpement Communautaire (CDC) in Kiringye. Similarly, beans are grown predominantly in the central part of Lemera, covering areas from Rubanga to Mulenge, with large portions marketed in Bukavu and Uvira, as well as exported to neighboring countries like Burundi and Rwanda. Maize is widely cultivated in the Ruzizi Plain and the Hauts Plateaux, where it serves as a primary food source. Peanuts, primarily grown in Luvungi are consumed locally and exported to Rwanda and Burundi, with some also sold in Bukavu.

The Bafuliiru Chiefdom is also notable for its coffee production, with two species cultivated: Coffea arabica and Coffea canephora. The more common arabica species is grown in areas such as Ndolera, Buheba, Lemera, Katala, and Mugule, and is a significant export product, particularly to Burundi.

=== Militarized mining ===
Researcher Judith Verweijen argues that economic militarization in the chiefdom extends beyond the direct involvement of armed forces in revenue generation, as it also takes indirect forms when businesspeople and local leaders mobilize armed groups to intimidate competitors, deter official intervention, or suppress protests over land sales and perceived unfair prices. In Lemera, customary authorities have used local defense forces, often indirectly, to consolidate their control over mineral extraction, which Verweijen noted generates tensions with the local administration.

Polished section of a specimen containing three rare tantalum minerals, cesplumtantite, lithiotantite, and calciotantite, associated with cassiterite, according to the original specimen label. The specimen was previously held by the Vandenbroucke Museum. Locality: Manono-Kitotolo Mine, Tanganyika.

Until 2010, the Bafuliiru Chiefdom monopolized cassiterite governance. The mwami allocated mining concessions in exchange for an itulo (customary tax) of approximately USD 450–500 per pit, while producing pits faced additional levies of roughly one day's output per month and one sack of cassiterite per day. According to Verweijen, this system fostered patronage and arbitrary treatment, favoring the mwami’s allies. The chiefdom's mining oversight committee (comité des creuseurs) included close associates, including Molière, commander-in-chief of the local defense forces, and Quinquina, president of the chiefdom's comité des sages (council of elders).

Customary protection also extended to alleged illegal land dispossession. In a dispute over a seven-hectare cassiterite concession at Kigunga, whose owners brought the case before a court in Uvira, the mwami and his associates reportedly mobilized local defence members to shield the accused from court summonses. The judge ultimately ruled in favor of the original occupants. In 2010, the chiefdom's control over cassiterite mining generated tensions with national mining officials sent to Lemera to enforce mining regulations. Their responsibilities included demarcating concessions and registering pit owners. Previously registered only by the chiefdom, concession holders and managers (présidents-directeurs généraux, or PDGs) remained outside the national tax system. The chiefdom resisted these reforms and continued to exercise de facto control over the sector. This influence persisted under a 2012 agreement between Ndare and Bukavu businessman Olive Mudekereza Namegabe, who acquired the two main concessions at Lemera–Kigunga and Mugerero. In return, the chiefdom apparently retained influence through appointments to the mining committee, whose members Olive paid monthly. The new arrangement coincided with the introduction of the International Tin Supply Chain Initiative (iTSCi) traceability scheme, which was developed amid international pressure to curb conflict-mineral trade in eastern Congo. Its closed-pipeline system used barcode-tagged mineral sacks to track ore from validated, conflict-free mining sites through the supply chain, with site assessments conducted by independent auditors.

Yellowish-white crystal aggregates of rankamachite, a rare tantalum-bearing mineral, from the Mumba Cassiterite Gravels, Mumba, Masisi Mountains, North Kivu.

Falling global tin prices, Olive's concession monopoly, traceability requirements and declining demand for Congolese minerals combined to depress local cassiterite prices from USD 8 per kilogram in 2010 to below USD 2.50 by May 2015. Production subsequently declined, along with the numbers of PDGs and artisanal miners. Local mining interests largely blamed Olive, the sector's most visible figure, for fueling hostility towards the new management. Resentment deepened because the mwami had introduced the arrangement without consulting miners and pit managers. The restructuring also excluded local mineral traders (négociants), many of whom "provided loans to local businesses, from trading, disrupting an important source of credit".

Mining-sector tensions are also worsened by the politicization of the mining committee. The 2012 death of Simon Ndare Simba II and the enthronement of his son Adam Ndare III Simba Kalingishi reignited the Bafuliiru Chiefdom's long-running succession dispute, and prompted Ndare's half-brother Albert Mukogabwe Muzimu-wa-Simba to renew his challenge, as he had in 1989–1990. With most committee members aligned with Adam, participation in mining governance, as Verweijen notes, has acquired a partisan dimension, prompting Albert's supporters to distance themselves from a sector they perceive as favoring their rivals. The committee was, for instance, accused of distributing Olive's financial and equipment support preferentially to the pro-Adam faction. These perceptions of bias are reinforced by the committee's close ties to local defense forces, whose leadership supports the pro-Adam faction. Under the new mining arrangements, these forces continued to provide security in surrounding areas and for Olive's company installations and mineral depot, while the committee oversaw security at the mining sites themselves. Their involvement raises questions about the mines' conflict-free status, particularly given local defense leaders' economic interests. Molière, the former commander-in-chief, previously owned a pit and supervised one allocated to the local defense forces by the chiefdom. Although the concession appears to have been withdrawn and Molière reportedly no longer holds his pit officially, he is widely believed to retain mining interests through intermediaries.

The committee's ties with the local defense forces have also constrained public protest against Olive's management, which Verweijen pointed out raises concerns that aggrieved mining-sector actors may turn to violence. In April 2015, an Olive representative who regularly visited Lemera survived an ambush. Many local observers interpreted the attack not as ordinary banditry but as a warning from those dissatisfied with the sector's management.

As of 2016, Verweijen said that local defense forces remain involved in securing two of Luvungi's three mining sites, Mukambo and Kinyinya, in the Moyens Plateaux. Although the Lupango-based force denies entering the sites, it remains the area's principal security provider. Officially responsible for patrols, the Katogota mining police and Lubarika PNC rarely appear, owing partly to transport and funding constraints; cooperation between the PNC and local defense forces is also limited. While filling gaps in state security provision, these forces risk enabling influence peddling through allied pit managers (PDGs) and customary authorities, while weakening accountability for security-related abuses. Mineral-sector militarization thus extends beyond the overt presence of armed groups to indirect influence and the threat of violence.

== Security problems ==
=== Interethnic and territorial disputes ===
Uvira Territory consists of three chiefdoms: Bafuliiru, Ruzizi Plain, and Bavira. Their establishment followed a royal decree adopted by the Belgian colonial authorities in 1928. This decree amended the decree of 23 August 1910, which stipulated that the Barundi, who had migrated in search of pastureland, were not entitled to local administrative structures because they could return to their homeland at any time. The Barundi had settled in the Ruzizi Plain with the permission of the Fuliru mwami, to whom they reportedly gave annual gifts in exchange for access to pastureland. The establishment of the Barundi Chiefdom, now known as the Ruzizi Plain Chiefdom, has been a source of tension between the Fuliru and the Barundi. The Fuliru attribute its establishment to their continued stance toward colonial rule, the colonial authorities' attempt to weaken mwami Mukogabwe's resistance, the policy of divide and rule, and conflicts between the local population and migrants. The Barundi, however, reject these explanations as discriminatory, arguing that they portray them as foreigners on Congolese soil.

The Barundi maintain that their chiefdom was established under conditions similar to those of the Fuliru and Vira, arguing that they had an organized social and political system before Belgian colonization. Its establishment occurred in two phases: the creation of the Barundi sector under Chief Mugabo in 1925 and its elevation to chiefdom status in 1928. The chiefdom's origins remain contested, with the Barundi and the Fuliru offering different oral accounts. A more nuanced interpretation holds that the Barundi Chiefdom was established during the reign of mwami Mukogabwe II, traditionally dated to 1914–1929. According to this interpretation, the Belgian authorities divided his territory into separate chiefdoms because of his opposition to colonial rule and ostensibly to promote peaceful coexistence. This account implies that the present-day Ruzizi Plain Chiefdom once formed part of Fuliru territory, a claim disputed by the Barundi. Written records date the establishment of the Barundi Chiefdom to 1928. The administrative report identifies Order No. 3 of 18 August 1928, issued by Kivu District Commissioner René Van der Ghinste, as the legal basis for its creation. Other historical accounts written by early European observers suggest that the Bahamba dynasty of the Fuliru traditionally controlled all of Uvira Territory and parts of the western lakeshore as far north as Luvungi. The dynasty was based in Lemera, in the northwestern part of the Ruzizi Plain.

According to Université Officielle de Bukavu researcher Romain Safari, the chiefdom's establishment under the name Barundi fueled Fuliru–Barundi tensions and eventual armed conflict over territorial status and challenges by the Fuliiru and Bavira to Barundi nationality. In 1961, under pressure from the Fuliru, the Barundi Chiefdom was renamed the Ruzizi Plain Chiefdom. The Barundi strongly opposed this change, and the dispute helped fuel armed fighting between the communities. The Barundi eventually fled across the border to Burundi, leaving a power vacuum.

Safari noted disagreements over who first occupied the territory of the present-day Ruzizi Plain Chiefdom. The Barundi claim to have inhabited the Ruzizi Plain before the Fuliru. According to Barundi accounts, Ntorogwe led the first migration into Congolese territory around 1750, reportedly finding the plain uninhabited. They maintain that the Fuliru descended from the high plateau into the plain during Mugabo's reign to hunt and escape Mukogabwe's hostilities.

Several accounts describe the migration of Burundians into Congo. Cyprien Runiga identifies Kinyoni as the first Murundi to arrive in Congolese territory, reportedly around 1850, during the reign of Nyamugira I. Kinyoni is said to have migrated from Buliga, Burundi, in search of pasture. His host granted him land in exchange for tribute to Nyamugira I. Historian Jacques Depelchin, however, dates Ntorogwe's first migration in search of pasture to around 1800. While some migrants settled near the Ruzizi River, Ntorogwe and his followers continued south along Lake Tanganyika to Kaboge. Ntorogwe later returned to Burundi, where he died near Cibitoke. His eldest son, Rugendeza, subsequently crossed the Ruzizi and settled again at Kaboge. Growing pressure on pastureland may have contributed to Rugendeza and his followers' northward migration to Kawizi, about ten miles from Uvira. Rugendeza died around 1870 and was briefly succeeded by his eldest son, Lushimba, whose sudden death led to Kinyoni's succession.

=== Rebellion after independence ===
The years following Congolese independence in 1960 were turbulent in Uvira Territory, as political changes, including elections, intensified power struggles. Among the Fuliru, emerging political leaders sought to curb the authority of customary chiefs, whom they accused of collaborating with the colonial regime. A key figure in this movement was Fuliru politician Moïse "Musa" Marandura, a member of the Kivu provincial parliament. Following the overthrow of Kivu's government by radical nationalists in late 1960, Marandura sought to advance his political ambitions. Amid growing political unrest, the paramount chiefs of both the Fuliru and Barundi fled to Burundi, which then enable Marandura to assume interim leadership of both chiefdoms. In April 1961, Fuliru chief Henri Simba Nyamugira returned to office and dismissed the administrative staff and chefs de groupement appointed by Marandura. Days later, Fuliru residents of the Ruzizi Plain Chiefdom attacked Barundi residents and their property, including livestock, in an episode later known as the guerre de chèvres ("war of the goats"). After losing control of the Bafuliiru Chiefdom, Marandura claimed authority over the Ruzizi Plain Chiefdom, questioning the Barundi's legitimacy on the grounds that they were allegedly foreigners "who had usurped the Fuliru's ancestral grounds".

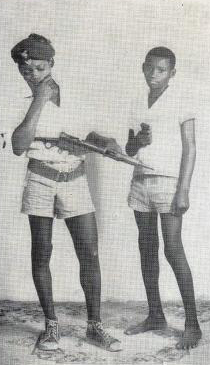
Two Simbas child soldiers with submachine guns

Verweijen argues that Fuliru–Barundi tensions during this period were driven largely by internal power struggles among Fuliru elites, particularly Marandura and his followers' efforts to displace customary chiefs, whose authority they considered outdated. In late 1963, Marandura's movement joined the National Liberation Council (Conseil national de libération; CNL), a revolutionary movement in exile that sought to overthrow the Congolese government. Based in Bujumbura, the CNL began recruiting and training forces for a large-scale rebellion. In May 1964, the newly formed rebel army, under Fuliru commander Louis Bidalira, captured Uvira. The rebels' success was partly attributed to their sense of invincibility, which they associated with water rituals (mai or mayi in Congo Swahili) believed to make them immune to bullets. After the capture of Uvira, the Simba (or Mulelist) rebellion spread rapidly to other parts of the Congo. However, the rebellion's gains were short-lived. In 1967, Congolese forces and foreign mercenaries recaptured most rebel strongholds, aided by local auxiliaries (militants-combattants) recruited from the population to provide intelligence and guide government troops. Former Mulelists and militants-combattants later took up arms again during the Congo Wars, "this time fighting a common enemy".

=== The Congo Wars (1996–2003) and their aftermath ===
In the 1980s, intercommunal tensions in Uvira Territory intensified, partly because of changes in nationality laws. These tensions involved groups identifying as "autochthones" (natives) and those labelled "Rwandophones", including Barundi speakers of Kirundi, whom some groups portrayed as foreigners. Tensions escalated in the early 1990s amid political competition over the transition to multiparty democracy. In 1991, a nationality-identification census was conducted in the Ruzizi Plain. The process was reportedly marred by irregularities, including the exclusion of Barundi from identification. Fuliru youths also gathered outside the Barundi mwami's residence, chanting, "Ndabagoye, Ndabagoye, obwami bwamala" ("Ndabagoye, your reign is finished"). Chief Ndabagoye fled to Burundi and was subsequently suspended amid accusations of nationalité douteuse ("doubtful nationality").

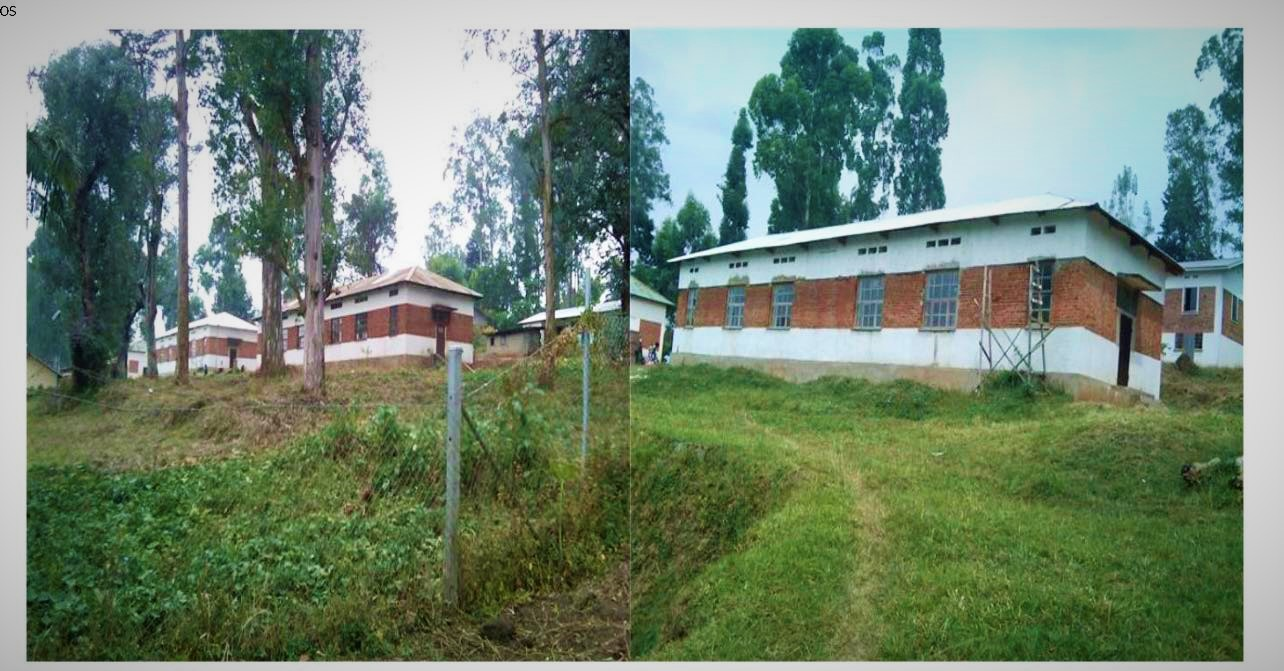
The Lemera Hospital, where the Lemera massacre took place in October 1996

In 1993 and 1994, unrest intensified as tens of thousands of Burundian and Rwandan refugees arrived, fleeing civil wars in their countries. They were housed in 11 camps along the Ruzizi River, alongside soldiers of the former Rwandan government army and allied Interahamwe militias, both implicated in the 1994 Rwandan genocide. Concerned about the military threat posed by these forces, Rwanda's Tutsi-led regime "devised a scheme to invade and forcibly shut down the camps". It subsequently assembled a regional coalition of Congolese insurgents that also sought regime change in Zaire. On 18 October 1996, the AFDL, whose forces had already entered the mountains of Uvira Territory, attacked the Ruzizi Plain and systematically assaulted the refugee camps. This marked the beginning of the First Congo War. On 6 October 1996, AFDL forces and a Banyamulenge-led militia massacred 37 people at Lemera Hospital, including Hutu refugees, Zairean soldiers, and Fuliiru civilians. According to the Democratic Republic of the Congo 1993-2003 UN Mapping Report, the victims were killed in their beds by "gunshots or bayonets". On 13–14 October, AFDL and Banyamulenge armed units killed refugees at Runingu camp, and on 20 October, they targeted Burundian and Rwandan Hutu refugees in Luvungi, where they inflicted heavy casualties. In Katala village, in the middle plateau of Bafuliiru Chiefdom, the forces captured and executed fleeing refugees at close range and then compelled local residents to bury the bodies in mass graves. That same 20 October 1996, AFDL-APR-FAB units killed an unidentified number of Hutu refugees, including approximately 20 in Kanganiro camp's hospital in Luvungi, and refugees and Zairean civilians fleeing toward Burundi in Rubenga village, Uvira Territory. In Kakumbukumbu, five kilometers from Lubarika camp, soldiers burned 30 refugees alive inside a house. The next day, the units massacred approximately 370 refugees in Luberizi and Mutarule.

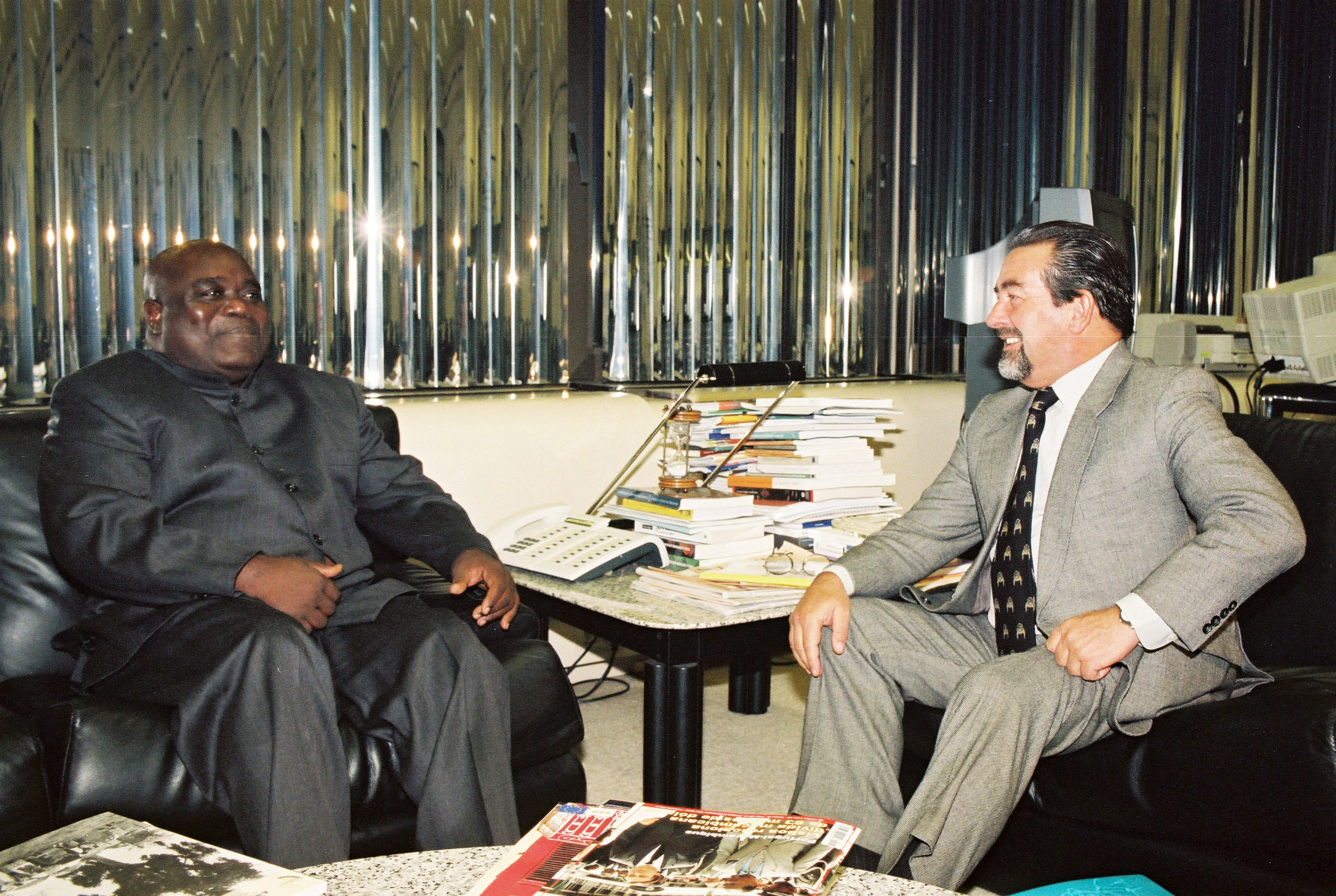
Visit of Laurent-Désiré Kabila to the EC, discussing the armed conflict raging in the area, November 1998

In response, youths in the Ruzizi Plain mobilized against what they perceived as a foreign occupying force. Customary chiefs and former Mulelist combatants supported them, arranging for healers or seers to perform rituals believed to protect them from bullets. These practices involved potions and water rituals (mai) similar to those associated with the Simba rebellion. The groups became known as Mai-Mai. The Mai-Mai initially offered limited resistance. The AFDL subsequently persuaded some groups that overthrowing Mobutu served their shared interests. A prominent AFDL leader, Laurent-Désiré Kabila, was well known locally as a former Simba rebel who continued his insurgency in Fizi Territory into the early 1980s. Some Mai-Mai leaders, however, continued to resist the AFDL even after it captured Kinshasa in 1997 and Kabila declared himself the president of the DRC and renamed the country the "Democratic Republic of the Congo". From August 1998, additional Mai-Mai combatants mobilized against the RCD.

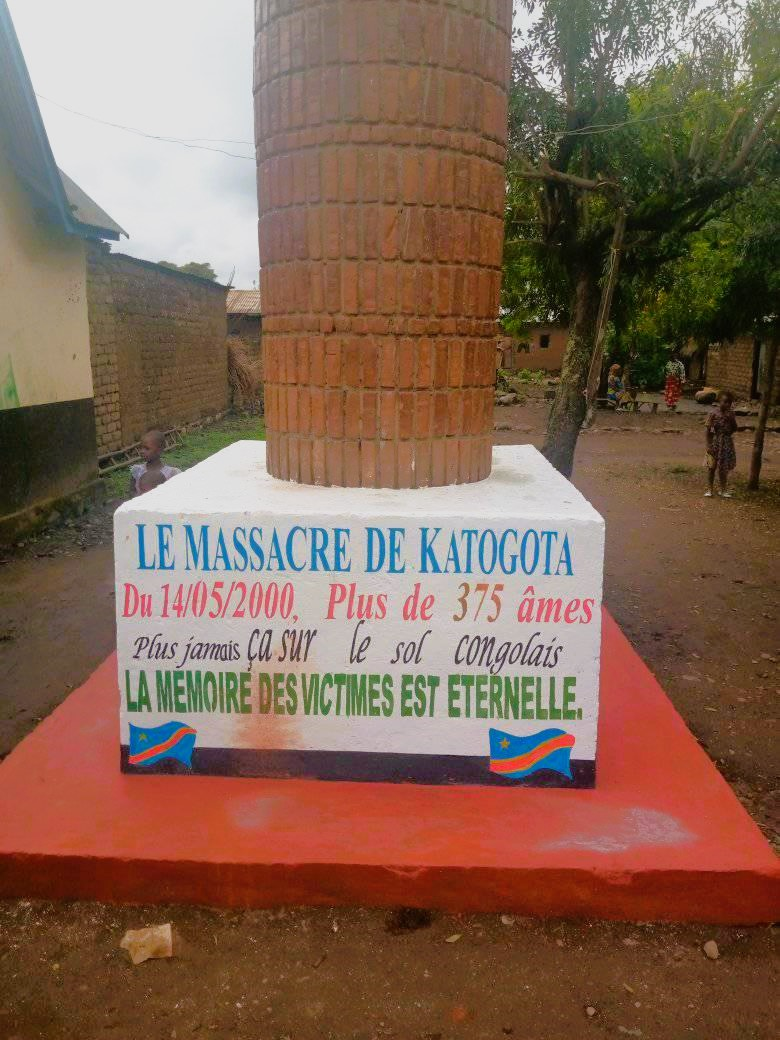
The monument in Katogota village commemorates the victims of the Katogota massacre.

During the Second Congo War (1998–2003), the Bafuliru Chiefdom again became a battleground for rival armed groups, including the Rwandan Patriotic Army (RPA), the RCD, RCD-Goma, and various Mai-Mai militias. On 6 August 1998, RCD-Goma fighters killed 13 people, including the Kiringye chief, in Lwiburule, while RCD-Goma and RPA operatives killed 15 civilians near Kivovo, Kigongo, and Kalungwe. Efforts were made to unite and coordinate the roughly six Mai-Mai groups operating in Uvira Territory under RCD occupation. However, key Mai-Mai leaders in the Bafuliiru Chiefdom, including former Mulelist Louis Bidalira and brigade commanders Kayamba Kabugo and Jeannot Ruharara, retained varying degrees of autonomy. Some battalion commanders, including Abduhramane Matata Lipanda (known as Abdou) and Mwenyemali, also gradually distanced themselves from their superiors. Other leaders operated in the Bavira Chiefdom, including Baudouin Nakabaka and former Mulelist leader Zabuloni Rubaruba. Verweijen noted that these divisions reflected competition over power and resources, interethnic and interclan tensions, and the RCD's efforts to divide the Mai-Mai. On 14 May 2000, RCD-Goma forces massacred more than 300 people in Katogota. In late 2000, the RCD sought to recruit Mai-Mai combatants. Dozens of fighters, including Bede Rusagara, left the mountains to join its forces. After six months of training by Rwandan military instructors, "they were redeployed as local defense forces tasked with guarding security in villages and towns in order to back up the RCD's military wing". In the Ruzizi Plain, some of these forces operated under chief Floribert Nsabimana Ndabagoye, who had regained power in 1996 and was reportedly allied with the RCD. According to the recollections of many Fuliru, Ndabagoye used these yellow-uniformed forces, known as Majaunets, to pursue personal interests, particularly to settle scores and suppress opponents. Similar patterns later emerged when customary authorities mobilized local defense forces to strengthen their own power.

The 2003 peace agreement formally ended the Second Congo War and ushered in a transitional period (2003–2006) leading to general elections. The signatories agreed to share government positions and subsequently integrate their forces into a new national army, the FARDC. In Uvira Territory, Mai-Mai brigades were initially integrated with locally deployed RCD units. From 2005, combatants were sent to training centres for further integration and redeployment into new units. The process was uneven, as Mai-Mai and RCD leaders sought to retain control over their forces. Many autonomous Mai-Mai commanders also resisted subordination to RCD or other Mai-Mai officers. Mai-Mai combatants also perceived the allocation of military ranks and positions as favoring the RCD. Although many Mai-Mai officers eventually joined the FARDC, others, including Zabuloni, resisted integration for years. Some who joined the army later returned to Uvira Territory on medical or extended leave, or after deserting. Dissatisfied with their assignments and reluctant to serve far from their former strongholds, these officers had little incentive to remain in the army. Some returned to armed activity or joined local defense forces, often recruiting among the thousands of unemployed demobilized fighters who remained in Uvira Territory. Many of these men and women were left to fend for themselves, a legacy of the Congo Wars that, as Verweijen argues, contributed to subsequent armed mobilization.

According to Verweijen, the growth of armed groups after 2006 was driven by several connected factors. Power-sharing arrangements incentivized continued armed mobilization by offering potential access to state positions and broader political and economic influence. Regional dynamics also mattered, as foreign and foreign-backed armed groups remained active in eastern Congo. Other drivers included disputes over local authority, land, and identity. In Uvira Territory, remobilization developed in several waves after the transition. The first stage followed the Amani peace conference held in Goma in 2008. The conference encouraged former commanders and combatants to form new armed groups or increase their visibility. Seeking promised benefits, including positions in the national army, several armed groups in Uvira Territory intensified their activities.

The second wave came during military integration and operations in 2009–2010. These activities changed local power relations and increased insecurity, which then encouraged Mai-Mai groups to take up arms again and leading to the formation of local defense forces. The third wave followed the 2011–2012 elections and the emergence of local offshoots of the North Kivu-based March 23 Movement (Mouvement du 23 mars; M23) generated additional instability. During the same period, disputes over customary authority also fueled armed mobilization.

=== CNDP integration and FARDC operations against the FDLR ===
In 2009, the FARDC launched military operations across the Kivus against the FDLR. These operations followed the integration of the Tutsi-led CNDP and several other armed groups into the FARDC under a sudden peace deal between Kinshasa and Kigali. CNDP integration and the subsequent operations contributed to the remobilization of Mai-Mai groups and local defense forces in Uvira Territory. Having integrated from a position of strength, partly because of its ties to Kigali, the CNDP came to dominate the FARDC in the Kivus, reviving former Mai-Mai fighters' antagonism towards Rwandophones, including those serving in the army.

In April 2009, former Mai-Mai officer and FARDC 109th Brigade deputy battalion commander Fujo attacked Uvira. The son of Mulelist and Mai-Mai leader Zabuloni Rubaruba, Fujo was allegedly remobilized with the encouragement of a small circle of Fuliru politicians and businesspeople seeking to expand their local influence and sympathetic to Mai-Mai resistance against Rwandophones and their perceived allies, including the Kinshasa government. His force, numbering only a few dozen combatants, subsequently operated in the Moyens Plateaux of Uvira Territory, where it acquired significant influence partly through collaboration with the Burundian rebel group FNL and the FDLR. Fujo also maintained commercial ties with the FDLR through the cannabis trade.

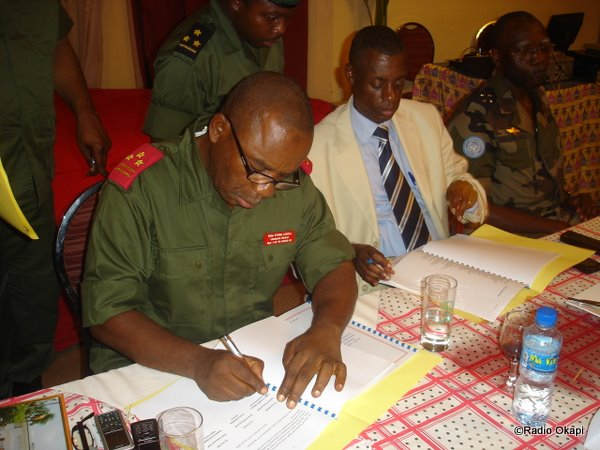
The FARDC and RDF chiefs of staff, Didier Etumba and James Kabarebe, assessing Operation Kimia II in January 2010

According to Verweijen, FDLR–Mai-Mai collaboration dated back to the Second Congo War, when Rwandan Hutu combatants who returned to eastern Congo after the AFDL invasion began cooperating with Mai-Mai groups against their common enemy, the RCD. These combatants later formed the FDLR, which remained active in eastern Congo during the transition period. From 2005, increasing numbers of FDLR fighters, their families, and other Rwandan refugees settled in Mulenge in the Moyens Plateaux. Through farming and trade in cannabis and cassiterite, they developed a substantial economic presence and became socially integrated. Yet the FDLR was also seen as oppressive, as it appropriated market-tax revenues, extorted goods and, amid the absence or passivity of state security forces, acted as both police and military. Its presence effectively curtailed the Fuliru chief's authority, with a member of the Fuliru lubunga (council of the wise) observing that the mwami had "effectively lost control over a part of his chiefdom". This changed when FARDC operations, first known as Kimia II and, from January 2010, as Amani Leo, dislodged the FDLR from the Moyens Plateaux. Seeking to avoid casualties, the group withdrew to the Itombwe Nature Reserve on the Hauts Plateaux, opening space for other armed groups and enabling the Fuliru chief to reassert control, partly through the formation of local defense forces.

=== The emergence and militarization of local defense forces ===
Alienated by the Kinshasa–Kigali alliance and subsequent military operations, and facing the loss of former sources of income, the FDLR began attacking civilians. The FARDC failed to protect civilians because of weak command and control and inadequate transport and communications in the mountainous region. Fearing FDLR retaliation and distrustful of the FARDC, hundreds of households fled to the Ruzizi Plain but soon returned because they depended on their mountain fields for their livelihoods. Former Mai-Mai combatants began organizing local defense groups to protect the returnees. As one commander recalled, the movement emerged from "the suffering, the desolation, the massacres": during Kimia II, "the whole population had fled", but the high cost of living on the plain and the need to return home drove their return. To formalize the initiative, Fuliru mwami Ndare Simba Simon proposed to the Kimia II command that the Bafuliiru Chiefdom establish and control armed local defense groups. The FARDC agreed on the condition that these groups provide intelligence and conduct reconnaissance during military operations. This arrangement recalls earlier forms of military cooperation with armed local groups, including during the Simba rebellion of the 1960s and under the RCD during the Second Congo War. With FARDC approval, the mwami authorized the distribution of assault rifles to village-based defense groups. Unlike Mai-Mai fighters based in the bush, local defense members remained in their villages and maintained their livelihoods while performing security duties part-time, mainly through night patrols.

According to Verweijen the "difference with Mai-Mai groups is that the local defense forces, which have no specific anti-government agenda, are tolerated by the state security forces and often collaborate with the army during military operations". Many Mai-Mai groups oppose the government and sometimes clash with the military, although they may also cooperate with it. Local defense groups are generally subordinate to customary authorities, although the extent of this control varies. At the village level, they answer to the chef de localité (village chief), while the commander-in-chief reports to the chiefdom's security council. Until September 2015, the commander-in-chief was Molière Mutulanyi, a former Mai-Mai logistics officer who later deserted the FARDC with the rank of captain.

Despite this formal structure, the mwami made most major decisions during the early years of mobilization. The forces increasingly served his political and security interests, enabling him to counterbalance the FARDC and limit military interference in his administration. In 2011, Ndare Simba, a provincial assembly member since 2007, sought to use the renamed Local and Legitimate Self-defense Forces (Forces d'autodéfense locales et légitimes, FALL) to support his parliamentary campaign and intimidate political opponents. Although established to protect villagers, local defense groups became increasingly entangled in the militarization and political instrumentalization associated with Mai-Mai groups.

=== The rise of Bede Rusagara ===
The mwami was not the only actor seeking to exploit local defense networks. In 2011, Bede Rusagara (also known as Obedi or Bedy), a native of Mutarule in the Ruzizi Plain, deserted the FARDC and formed an armed group in the Moyens Plateaux that later became known as the Congolese Movement for Change (Mouvement congolais pour le changement, MCC). Struggling to recruit fighters, Bede sought to draw on the local defense forces, many of whose members were former Mai-Mai combatants. He also maintained contacts with FNL, but his recruitment efforts achieved limited success. Having joined the RCD's local defense forces during the Second Congo War, Bede maintained close ties with former RCD-associated Rwandophone networks. These ties contributed to mistrust among Fuliru who identified as autochthones (indigenous inhabitants of the area).

After joining the FARDC during the transition period, Bede joined the CNDP before reintegrating into the army in 2009 and deserting again in 2011. Former CNDP and other FARDC networks facilitated his return to armed activity and supplied him with ammunition. His ties to former CNDP networks became particularly evident in 2012, when he attempted to establish an M23 offshoot in South Kivu. His attempted alliance with the M23 and his recruitment of an estimated 250 fighters, many of them Rwandophones, also reinforced mistrust among the Fuliru. Yet his role in the Ruzizi Plain conflict and strategy of multi-positioning, maintaining ties with nominally opposing sides, secured support among Fuliru and pro-government elites. He shared information about the M23 with the government while maintaining contact with both. The M23's defeat in late 2013 did little to diminish his influence. Backed by national and provincial politicians and businesspeople, and well connected to local authorities, Bede became one of Uvira Territory's most powerful warlords, retaining that position until the FARDC shot him dead in August 2015. Beyond alleged political patronage, Bede financed his activities through cattle theft, kidnappings, ambushes and extortion of minibus operators in the Ruzizi Plain. His political connections afforded him de facto impunity from security services and military justice (auditorat), while direct intimidation also deterred investigation. As one military justice official recalled, Bede once called out his movements despite the two never having met, which then suggested that Bede monitored the movements of security and judicial personnel through an intelligence network involving civilian collaborators. The network included motards (motor-taxi drivers), whose work gave them knowledge of local movements.

=== Local defense forces ===
A Mai-Mai fighter photographed by Eddy Mbuyi in South Kivu. Although armed groups are sometimes perceived as protectors of local communities, they can also impose illegal taxes and contribute to insecurity.

Verweijen pointed out that beyond state security services, numerous armed groups and local defense forces complicate security in Uvira Territory. Verweijen notes that factional boundaries are fluid because armed actors are often connected through family ties, former school or military affiliations, and neighborhood relations. These ties embed local defense forces and Mai-Mai within the population and contribute to the militarization of governance, as local authorities and residents enlist armed groups to pressure rivals or settle personal disputes. Such connections also undermine accountability, as civilians withhold information from state security forces and law enforcement officials. Combined with the poor performance of the army and police, Verweijen said that these dynamics weaken security provision and reinforce reliance on local defense forces.

Local defense forces operate across much of Bafuliiru Chiefdom, particularly in remote mountainous areas. Although reliable figures are unavailable, Molière reportedly estimated that they numbered 3,000–4,000 in mid-2014. Collectively known as balala rondo, these groups differ in their organization, conduct, and relations with authorities and other armed actors. They lack centralized command, with some commanders following Molière (or his successor), while others operate autonomously. In certain areas, their structures and nomenclature closely resemble those of a miniature army. Along the Ndolera axis, in the Itara–Luvungi groupement, "Lieutenant Colonel" Prospèr Mahinduzi, a former intelligence officer in Kayamba's Mai-Mai, commands a brigade comprising village-based battalions and companies. Their commanders are supported by a general staff (état-major) whose ranks and functions mirror those of the national army, including intelligence (S2) and operations (S3). According to Verweijen, this military-style organization reflects the perceived need to operate alongside the FARDC, as commanders wear elements of FARDC uniforms and commonly carry two-way radios, adopting military insignia and dress as markers of organizational identity rather than formal state affiliation. One commander compared this practice to the wearing of TP Mazembe football club colours.

Not all local defense forces are organized along military lines. On the Mulenge axis, forces under village chief Ngengwe Masabire have one commander per village, assisted by a deputy and secretary in each avenue. They generally do not wear military uniforms. Even where organized along military lines, local defense forces generally remain subordinate to customary authorities, with village chiefs serving as chefs d'état-major (chief of the general staff) at the battalion level. Many chiefs are former Mai-Mai who use these forces to reinforce their authority, enforce decisions, and neutralize opponents. Chiefs also sometimes arrange dawa ya asili, a customary medicine used for spiritual protection in battle, that most "local defense groups use, similar to the Mai-Mai".

Local chiefs and other leaders organize community contributions to local defense forces, including maize, manioc flour, and batteries for night patrols. Such contributions, Verweijen said, come from households, businesses, roadblocks, and markets. Although often described as bavoluntaires (volunteers), members generally receive food before patrols, while commanders and officers may receive financial incentives. The commander-in-chief reportedly receives a share of chiefdom tax revenues. Historically, local defense forces also operated a chiefdom-donated cassiterite mine in Lemera. Residents of isolated mountain villages often consider these contributions justified because they view local defense forces as more numerous, effective, and socially embedded than the army and police. Many refer to them as batoto ya hapa ("children from here"), contrasting them with state security personnel, or batokambali ("those from far away"). The perceived need for local defense forces intensified after the FDLR's withdrawal from the Moyens Plateaux during the Sokola II ("Clean Up II") army operations launched in January 2015. Having returned in 2013 after earlier military operations ended, the FDLR were again displaced, with local defense forces serving as FARDC guides and intelligence sources. Their casualties and collaboration with the army fueled fears of FDLR reprisals, particularly in areas such as Mubere, where the FARDC had secured their disarmament. With the FDLR still nearby and local defense forces disbanded, residents feared being accused of helping the army locate and destroy FDLR fields. Despite their perceived protective value, residents also reported problems with local defense forces, describing them as a "double-edged sword" that brings security and insecurity.

In some villages, local defense force members collaborate with bandits and armed groups, including in the trade in stolen cattle from the Ruzizi Plain. They are also frequently mobilized to settle personal disputes and regulate conflicts involving debt, family relations, romantic affairs, land and property. In Mugogo, for example, local defense forces protected the holders of a contested land concession by preventing expelled farmers from reclaiming the land. They have also been implicated in assassinations and the killing of suspected sorcerers, sometimes acting as hired guns. Such interventions militarize village-level governance by enabling residents to enlist armed groups to enforce social order and advance private interests. Local defense forces also undermine the authority of the Police nationale congolaise (PNC) by intervening in disputes and performing police functions, including arrests, fines, and detention. Intimidated by better-armed local forces, police officers report being unable to exercise authority, with local leaders sometimes securing the release of detainees. Such accounts portray local defense forces as a parallel administration capable of suppressing criticism with impunity. Although police allegations warrant caution given the PNC's own record of inefficiency, arbitrary arrests and extortionate fines, they point to an asymmetric relationship between the two institutions.

Outnumbered and outgunned, the PNC often lacks the capacity to hold local defense forces accountable. Although the chiefdom initially supplied these groups with limited weaponry, many have since expanded their arsenals, purchasing arms from the FDLR or retaining weapons recovered from enemy forces during joint operations with the FARDC. These military and material advantages, combined with local political influence, also constrain police supervision and accountability.

When accused of offences, members of local defense forces often evade arrest and questioning by the PNC or military prosecutors. They may hide among civilians with local authorities' assistance or intimidate security and judicial personnel directly. Insecurity in remote terrain also impedes arrests, with military personnel fearing ambushes in the escarpments around Lemera. Accountability is also undermined by the forces' ambiguous legal status. Created with FARDC approval, they often regard themselves as state agents, while police and military officials classify them as unrecognized armed groups subject to disarmament, and these contested claims to legitimacy reflect broader governance tensions in Bafuliiru Chiefdom, where customary leaders seek to constrain local administrative authorities through regulatory non-compliance and influence over official decisions. Their ability to mobilize local defense forces has also supported customary power at the expense of the local administration.

== Customary power conflicts (2000s–present) ==
=== Ruzizi Plain Chiefdom ===
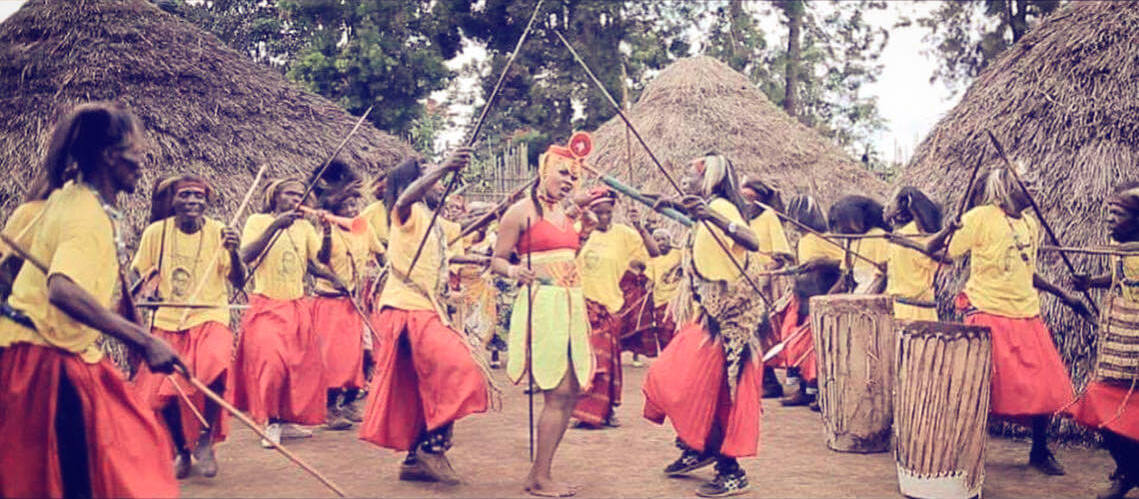
The Fuliru people performing a traditional dance in Sange

In 2012, Floribert Ndabagoye, the Rundi mwami of the Ruzizi Plain Chiefdom, was due to be reinstated. Many Fuliru contested his authority, claiming the right to rule the chiefdom and resenting his governance during the Second Congo War. Ndabagoye was suspended in 2004 while serving as an RCD member of parliament. In his absence, predominantly Fuliru interim administrators appointed new Fuliru chefs de groupement, which allowed Fuliru to consolidate their control over local authority and access to land. Exploiting ambiguities in the legal framework governing land in the DRC, the interim administrators sold large tracts of land, depriving many smallholders of access and intensifying conflicts between cattle owners and cultivators. Population growth and wartime displacement also intensified competition for land, while the local economy remained depressed after the late Mobutu era and the Congo Wars. The Kiliba Sugar Refinery, closed in 1995, never reopened, and rice production remained below prewar levels. Amid deepening poverty and mounting land pressures, Ndabagoye's return threatened to unsettle an existing distribution of authority and resources, helping explain Fuliru opposition to the restoration of Rundi rule.

Martin Kobler, Special Representative of the UN Secretary-General in the Democratic Republic of the Congo, listens to Burundian refugees at the Kavimvira transit camp during a visit to Uvira in 2015

In April 2012, Ndabagoye visited the chiefdom to prepare for his reinstatement but was assassinated in Luberizi shortly before the enthronement ceremony. An investigation by the Uvira military prosecutor's office implicated Bede Rusagara, a relative of the acting chiefdom administrator, Bike Rusagara, in the killing. Bede allegedly acted in collaboration with a network of Fuliru leaders, including several chefs de groupement. No suspects were indicted, reportedly because of political interference and insufficient evidence. The same authorities, allegedly backed by Fuliru politicians at provincial and national levels, reportedly sought to prevent Ndabagoye's son, Richard Nijimbere Kinyoni, from succeeding him by mobilizing Fuliru youth to barricade the Uvira–Bukavu road. Emile Baleke Kadudu, president of the South Kivu Provincial Assembly, was also implicated. A police officer deployed to the chiefdom described how politicians cultivated youth support through cash, alcohol and entertainment. Such mobilization drew on anti-Rundi rhetoric and echoed Fuliru politician Musa Marandura's efforts to consolidate his position in the early post-independence years. Some protesters were later recruited into Fuliru local defense groups that emerged in parts of the Ruzizi Plain Chiefdom. These groups emerged partly because many Fuliru distrusted locally deployed FARDC units, in which Banyamulenge officers held senior positions. Many Fuliru perceived the army as biased towards the Barundi, whom they saw as closely allied with the local Banyamulenge. They believed that the army was less willing to protect Fuliru lives and property and might intervene against their interests in local disputes. Fuliru also feared a pro-Rundi armed group based in Mutarule, composed mainly of Barundi and Banyamulenge fighters alongside some Burundian recruits. Established by Rundi customary authorities partly in response to intensified cattle raiding by Fuliru Mai-Mai groups, the pro-Rundi group also engaged in cattle looting, which was a major source of revenue for armed groups in the chiefdom. Its presence reinforced popular and political support for Fuliru Mai-Mai groups, several of which emerged during this period.

In 2013, Karakara, a former Mai-Mai officer and then a FARDC captain from Mutarule, deserted the military base in Luberizi. He returned to armed activity after his Banyamulenge regiment commander accused him of fomenting unrest and threatened to arrest him. Karakara also attributed his frustration with his position in the army to what he perceived as the systematic favoring of Rwandophone officers. Support for Mai-Mai groups also grew after the June 2014 massacre in Mutarule, in which more than 34 Fuliru were killed. The attack was widely attributed to the Rundi–Banyamulenge armed group based in the village, with its leader, Sheria, alleged to have played a key role. Sheria had previously served in the RCD's local defense forces in the Ruzizi Plain Chiefdom. The FARDC's response also undermined trust in the army. Although the locally deployed company reportedly attempted to intervene, its Banyamulenge battalion commander allegedly discouraged further action. This perceived failure reinforced support for Mai-Mai groups.

Verweijen noted that armed violence in the Ruzizi Plain Chiefdom was not confined to conflict between Barundi and Banyamulenge on one side and Fuliru on the other. Fuliru Mai-Mai groups also fought among themselves over territorial influence and the division of spoils. In 2014, Bede's killing of Karakara's brother in Uvira triggered a major rift between the two leaders. Rivalries among Fuliru Mai-Mai groups also reflected their ties to competing Fuliru factions. The dispute over the position of the chief of Luberizi, for example, pitted a faction allied with Mai-Mai Simusizi against one linked to Karakara. The emergence of Fuliru Mai-Mai groups thus intensified intercommunal conflict and contributed to the militarization of intra-Fuliru rivalries.

=== Bafuliiru Chiefdom ===
Conflict in the Ruzizi Plain Chiefdom is "closely related to events in the Bafuliiru Chiefdom, as local authorities and politicians try to exploit frictions with the Barundi to gain support and impair opponents". This dynamic also involved the Bafuliiru Chiefdom mwami, Simon Ndare Simba II, who lost the 2011 election, reportedly amid popular dissatisfaction with his performance as chief.

Much of the Bafuliiru Chiefdom consists of remote mountainous areas where small-scale agriculture predominates. Although some Fuliru raise cattle or work in cassiterite mines, economic opportunities remain limited, and many prominent Fuliru businesspeople are based in Uvira and Bukavu rather than within the chiefdom. Only the Itara–Luvungi groupement has a more diversified economy, with significant trade, services, and real estate activity. Despite these socioeconomic challenges, Ndare devoted little tax revenue to electrification, infrastructure, or administrative reform, instead using much of it for personal enrichment and patronage. The mwami and his networks profited from cassiterite mining, building houses and acquiring cars in Bukavu and Uvira while the wider population remained impoverished. The Ruzizi Plain conflict offered Ndare an opportunity to recover political support amid criticism of his governance, and he did little to prevent escalation. His sudden death from cardiac arrest in December 2012, following an unidentified illness widely suspected to have resulted from poisoning, revived a longstanding struggle over power in the Bafuliiru Chiefdom.

In 1977, Henri Simba Nyamugira stepped down as acting chief and left the position to his eldest son, Ndare. When Ndare went to Europe to continue his studies in 1980, he appointed his half-brother, Albert Mukogabwe Muzimu-wa-Simba, as interim chief. After their father died in 1988, Ndare returned to claim the customary title. Fuliru custom favors succession by the eldest son of the first wife, but Albert contested Ndare's claim. In 1989, Ndare briefly returned to Europe to conclude his affairs there. During his absence, the banjoga (Fuliru guardians of custom) invested Albert as mwami. Because the ceremony involved the lushembe, a diadem symbolizing royal authority, Albert's possession of it complicated Ndare's claim to the throne. After months of conflict, Albert withdrew in favor of Ndare.

Following Ndare's death in December 2012, Albert renewed his claim, but a ministerial decree recognized Ndare's eldest son, Adam Kalingishi, as customary chief. The pro-Albert faction nevertheless rejected the decision, encouraged by several influential Fuliru politicians and businesspeople. In February 2014, for example, national parliamentarian Justin Bitakwira publicly criticized a lubunga initiative to resolve the dispute at a meeting in Luvungi, in remarks broadcast on local radio. Other politicians and businesspeople supported Adam and his uncle, Edmond Muhogo, who became interim administrator while Adam was in Kinshasa preparing to study in Europe. Political interference obstructed efforts to resolve the succession dispute and aligned the rival camps with broader political divisions. Most supporters of Albert belonged to opposition parties, which reflected his sympathies for the Union for the Congolese Nation (Union pour la nation congolaise; UNC), whereas Adam's supporters generally belonged to pro-government parties.

According to Verweijen, persistent dissatisfaction with the new mwami and his inner circle also fuels the conflict. Accused of mismanaging chiefdom finances, reportedly under the influence of Ndare's former adviser Jean-Marie Kagombe, they allegedly divert much of the monthly USD 15,000 rétrocession (the share of national tax revenue returned to local authorities). A Fuliru mutuelle (self-help and social insurance association) leader claimed that much of this revenue was embezzled. By contrast, Albert's supporters call him icône or père du développement ("icon" or "father of development"), crediting him with contributing more positively to the chiefdom's development.

Weak administrative oversight has made reform difficult, while local defense forces have strengthened customary leaders' leverage over civilian authorities. The succession dispute has also politicized these forces: because former commander-in-chief Molière firmly supported mwami Adam, obedience to his orders became a political statement. Commanders seeking neutrality or sympathetic to Albert consequently distanced themselves from Molière, which then weakened centralized control and increased local commanders' autonomy and vulnerability to manipulation by local interests, which sometimes resulted in misconduct.

== See also ==
- Chiefdoms and sectors of the Democratic Republic of the Congo
