= Runingu =

- Grouping
- Groupement de Runingo
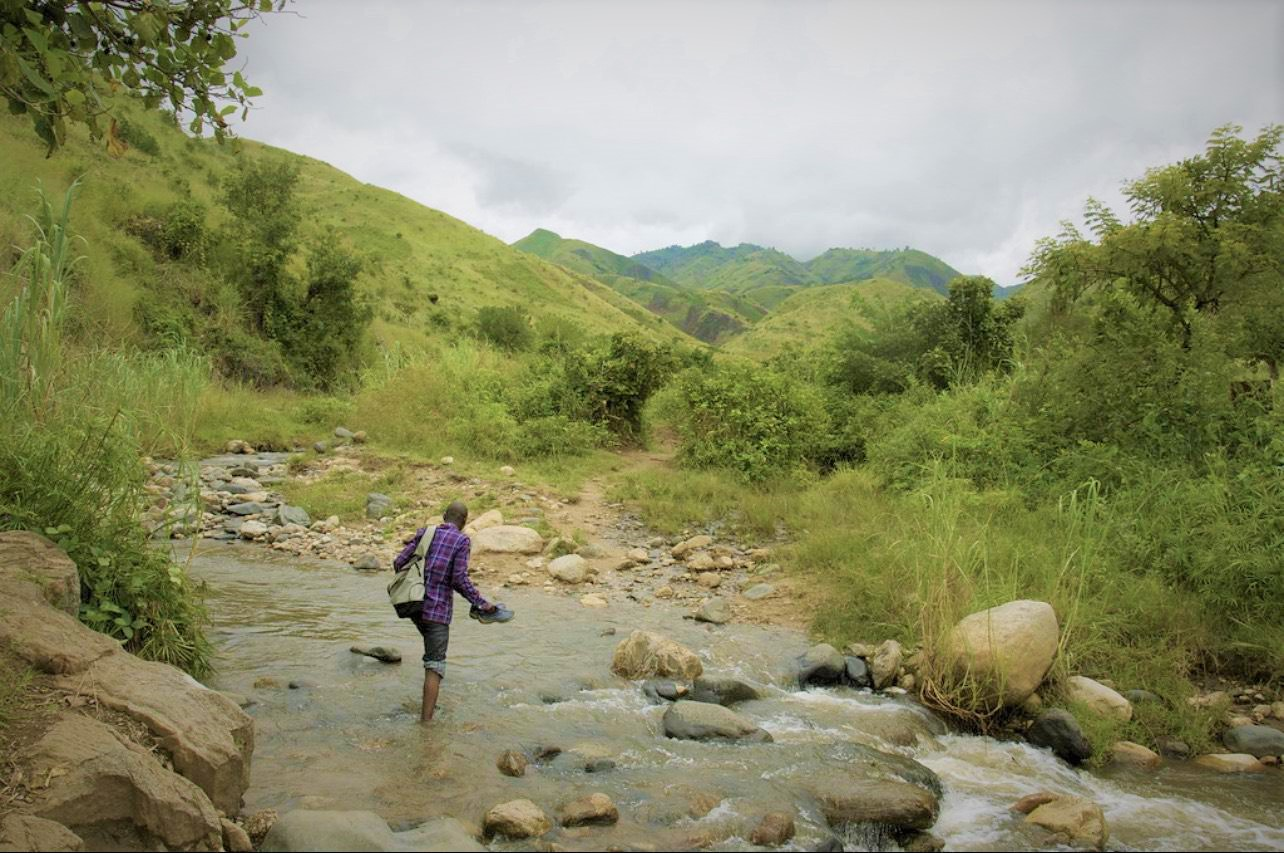
- Runingu River in the middle plateaux of Runingu, March 2013

- Location within Democratic Republic of the Congo
- Coordinates: 3°11′S 29°9′E
- Country: Democratic Republic of the Congo
- Province: South Kivu
- Territory: Uvira
- Chiefdom: Bafuliiru
- Time zone: UTC+2 (CAT)

Runingu is one of the groupements (groupings) that constitute the Bafuliiru Chiefdom in the Uvira Territory of the South Kivu Province in the eastern part of the Democratic Republic of the Congo. It is situated near the border with Burundi, along National Highway 5, to the north of Butaho.

== Administrative subdivisions ==
=== Villages ===
Runingu consists of following villages:

- Katembo
- Kashatu
- Ruhito
- Ruhuha
- Namuziba
- Kasambura
- Katwenge
- Bulindwe
- Narumoka
- Kalindwe

== Economy ==
=== Agriculture ===
Agriculture is the cornerstone of the region's economic base. Maize, beans, bananas, sweet potato, peanuts and cassava are among the staple crops grown by the local farmers. Coffee is also widely grown in the region, with coffee beans being a valuable cash crop. Farmers engage in subsistence and commercial farming. Apart from farming, livestock rearing is another major component of the local economy. Cattle, goats, sheep, and poultry are commonly raised in Runingu.

The proximity of Lake Tanganyika provides fishing opportunities for the locals. The abundance of fish species in the lake supports the livelihoods of many families engaged in fishing activities. Trade and commerce flourished in Runingu, with local markets serving as economic hubs. The villages within the groupement have marketplaces where locals round up to sell and purchase goods. The local economy is also influenced by cross-border trade with neighboring countries such as Rwanda and Burundi, taking advantage of the groupement's strategic location.

== See also ==
- Subdivisions of the Democratic Republic of the Congo
- Chiefdoms and sectors of the Democratic Republic of the Congo
- List of territories of the Democratic Republic of the Congo
- Fuliiru people
- Luindi Chiefdom
- Lemera
- Bwegera
