= Katogota =

Village in the DRC

- Village
- Village Katogota
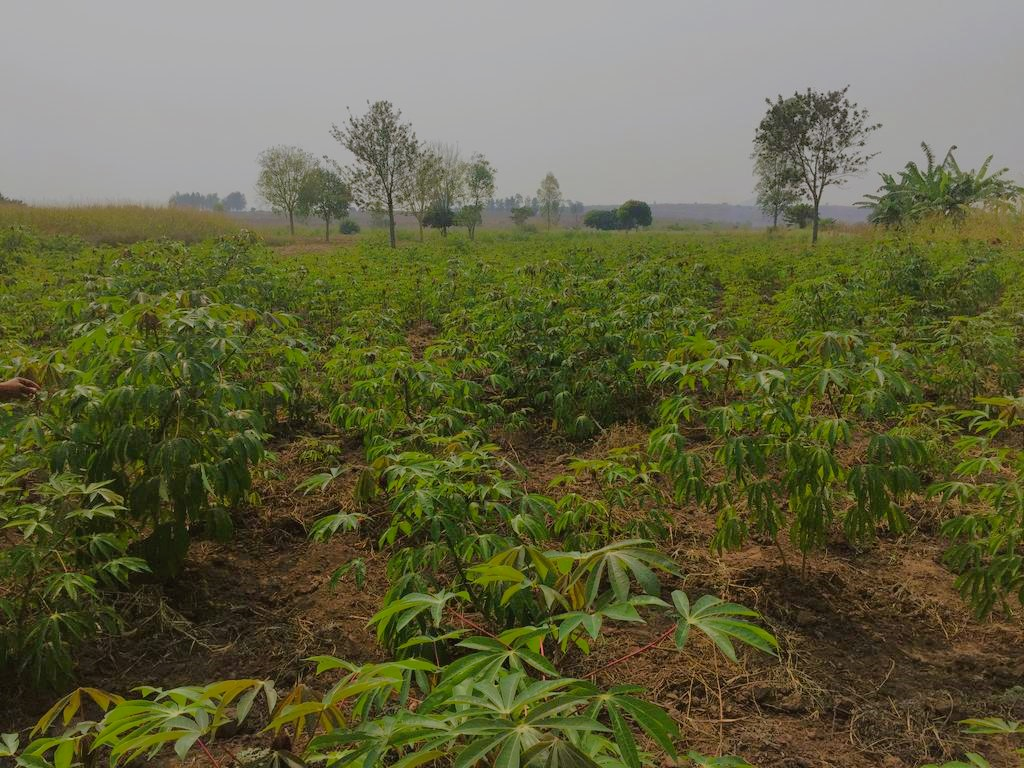
- The production of cassava in Katogota, April 2023
- Country: Democratic Republic of the Congo
- Province: South Kivu
- Territory: Uvira
- Chiefdom: Bafuliiru
- Groupement: Itara-Luvungi
- Time zone: UTC+2 (CAT)

Katogota is a village located in the Itara-Luvungi grouping within the Bafuliiru Chiefdom in Uvira Territory of the South Kivu Province in the Democratic Republic of the Congo. Situated approximately 60 km south of Bukavu, Katogota is in close proximity to the Kamonyi and Rusagara villages, near the border regions of Rwanda and Burundi.

Subsistence agriculture is the region's most significant economic activity and mainstay. The primary agricultural commodities include cassava, corn, paddy rice, tomato, palm oil, bean, banana, and groundnut. Geologically, the area features lateritic and black soils, particularly along the Ruzizi River, which possess clayey characteristics.

The region is infamous for the massacre that occurred during the Second Congo War in May 2000, claiming more than 300 lives. The widespread ramifications of the massacre have etched its name in the nation's annals.

== Katogota massacre and security problems ==
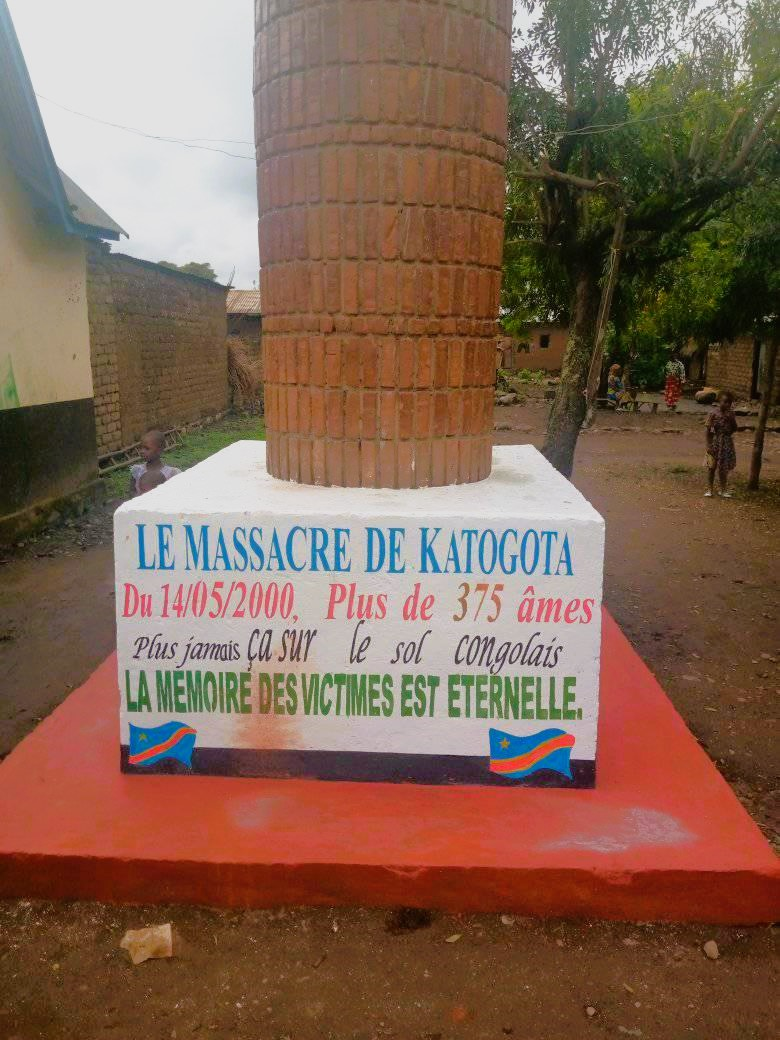
Monument of the Katogota massacre, was erected on the road in the village to commemorate the 375 victims.

On May 14, 2000, members of the ANC (the armed wing of the rebel group Rassemblement Congolais pour la Démocratie) reportedly killed more than 300 civilians in Katogota. According to the United Nations Mapping Report, the attackers were members of the Rwandan and Burundian armies, along with troops aligned with the Banyamulenge ethnic group—Congolese Tutsis based predominantly in the east of the country—who played a key role in the uprising against Laurent-Désiré Kabila. Arriving in Katogota aboard a truck, the rebels embarked on a sinister rampage, methodically perpetrating massacres in each household. The defenseless and terror-stricken villagers became victims of ruthless gunfire, while others met a gruesome fate as their homes were set ablaze, consuming them in flames. The exact number of casualties remains difficult to estimate as the rebels deliberately obstructed access to the village for several days, disposing of numerous bodies by burning them or callously casting them into the depths of the Ruzizi River. Some survivors recount the harrowing tales of their loved ones, whose lives were tragically cut short, their throats brutally slit before being cast into the Ruzizi River to obliterate any traces of their existence. The motive behind the massacre stemmed from the demise of an ANC commander, purportedly ambushed by elements affiliated with CNDD-FDD, which ultimately catalyzed the violent reprisal.

In the aftermath of the massacre, Eric Muvomo, the chief of the Katogota village, erected a monument to commemorate the 375 victims. May 14 was chosen to commemorate the date on which 375 people were brutally killed. Many remembered their loved ones, parents, and children, all of whom met a tragic end at the hands of assailants.

On May 3, 2020, Bope Yezu, a FARDC soldier of the 341st Rapid Reaction Battalion (Bataillon de Réaction Rapide), shot and killed his company commander for withholding a roadmap from Katogota to Uvira. He was subsequently arrested on May 4, 2020, while fleeing in Kamanyola, near Walungu Territory. The body of the deceased officer was sent to the morgue of the Bukavu General Hospital in anticipation of the funeral ceremonies.

== Climate ==
The Katogota village belongs to the equatorial climate with abundant rains covering the months of September to May with an average annual rainfall varying between 1500 mm and 2000 mm and average temperatures undergoing progressive modifications decreasing as the weather increases. Two main seasons characterize Katogota: the rainy and dry seasons.

== See also ==
- Mulenge
- Sange
- Lemera
- Fuliiru people
- Uvira Territory
