= Butaho =

- Village
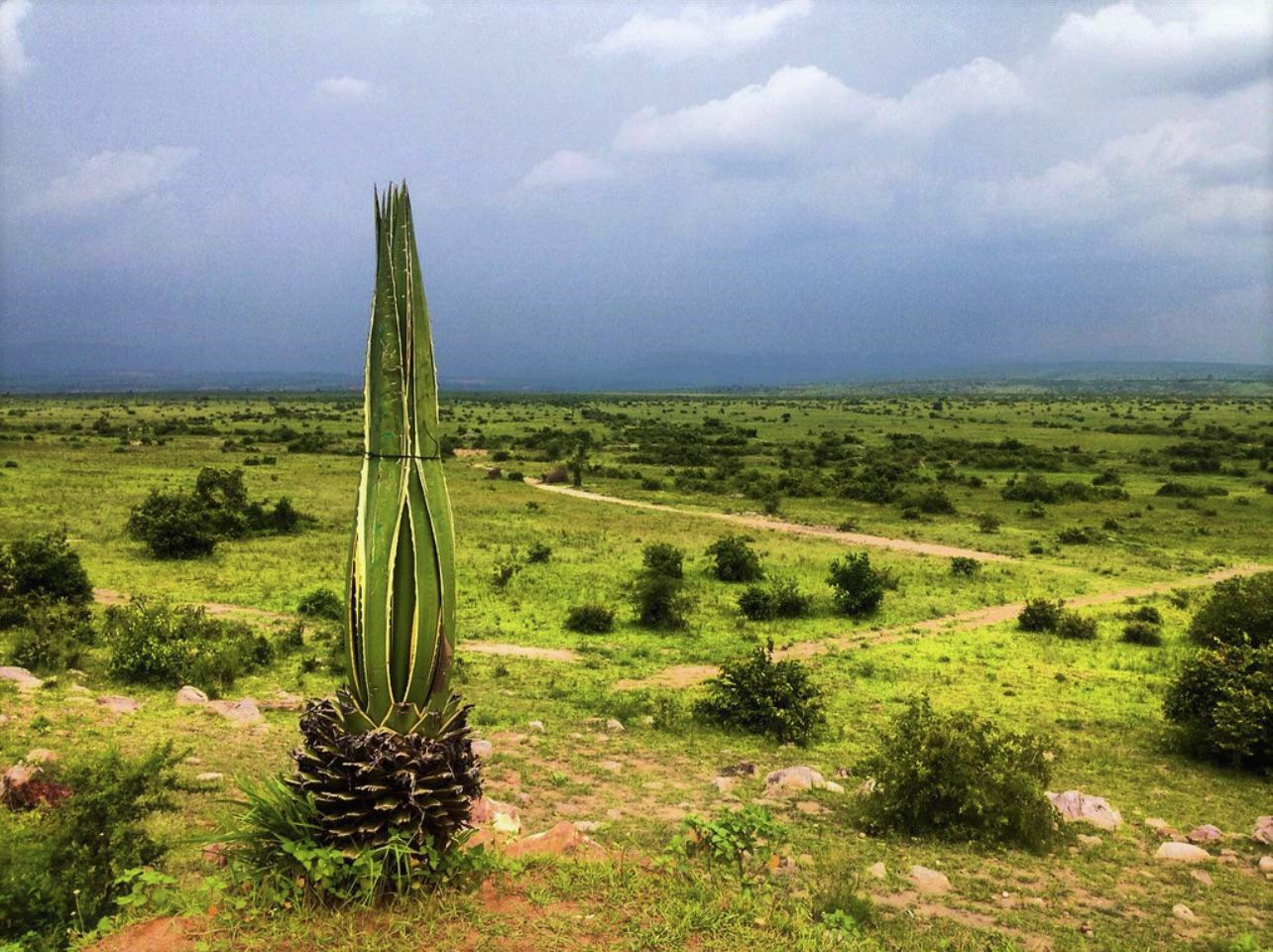
- View of grassland in Butaho in the Ruzizi Plain of the Democratic Republic of the Congo

- Location within Democratic Republic of the Congo
- Coordinates: 3°14′7″S 29°9′58″E
- Country: Democratic Republic of the Congo
- Province: South Kivu
- Territory: Uvira Territory
- Time zone: UTC+2 (CAT)

Butaho is a village situated in the Bafuliiru Chiefdom, within the Uvira Territory of the South Kivu province in the eastern part of the Democratic Republic of the Congo. It is located close to the border with Burundi, along National Highway 5.
