= Bwegera =

Village in the DRC

Coordinates: 2°54′12″S 29°03′06″E

Bwegera is a village in the Bafuliiru Chiefdom in the Uvira Territory of South Kivu Province, Democratic Republic of the Congo. Bwegera has an elevation of 952 meters and is situated in the vicinity of the Kakamba and Nyaruhuhuma villages. The region It's crossed by Lake Tanganyika, providing a vital source of water and transportation for the local inhabitants. Bwegera is rich in building materials such as rubble, sand, and baked bricks, making it an ideal location for construction and development. The region also encompasses a vast rural area where agriculture, animal breeding, and fishing are the primary means of livelihood.

Bwegera is inhabited by heterogeneous Fuliiru and Vira populations who share cultural similarities and practice agriculture, hunting, fishing, animal husbandry and artisanal handicraft. The region is also home to a small number of Bembe and Barundi.

For over 27 years, Bwegera has been devastated and experienced pernicious violence, notably during the First and Second Congo Wars of 1996–2003, where thousands of Hutu refugees and Zairian civilians were killed, and over a million people displaced, rendering them excruciating suffering in October 1996 when AFDL (Alliance des Forces Démocratiques pour la Libération du Congo-Zaïre) invaded Zaire from Rwanda.

== History ==
=== First Congo War ===
In the early stages of the First Congo War, Bwegera served as the AFDL gateway to eastern Zaire, where the AFDL troops split up into several villages and conducted widespread and systematic attacks against the eleven Hutu refugee camps and Zairian civilians. With the help of the Burundian army and Banyamulenge soldiers, the AFDL troops captured and killed refugees at point-blank range who were trying to flee to the neighboring villages.

=== Security problems (2008-2022) ===
Since the Second Congo War, insecurity in Bwegera has been fueled by an intricate web of geopolitics, ethnic and national rivalries, and the battle for control of the natural resources that abound in the east of the country.

In 2008, two FARDC (Forces Armées de la République Démocratique du Congo) soldiers of the 8th Integrated Brigade were killed around midday in Bwegera in the Ruzizi Plain of Uvira Territory in South Kivu.

In August 2009, a vehicle carrying traders and FARDC troopers of the 8th Integrated Brigade was attacked on the route between Rubanga and Kiringye-Nyamutiri by the FDLR (Forces Démocratiques de Libération du Rwanda) insurgent group. One civilian was killed, and one FARDC soldier was wounded by gunfire. Other ambushes occurred in the same month, including one against a convoy of Operation Kimya II, near Bwegera. On 27 August 2011, several people were killed after two gunfire incidents occurred in Bwegera. On 30 March 2012, unidentified gunmen attacked a transit vehicle in Bwegera from Lemera in the direction of Sange, killing a passenger. The bandits subsequently stole approximately 30,000 Congolese francs (32 dollars) from the passengers. On 2 July 2013, unidentified persons set fire to more than forty hectares of forest in the Bwegera and Luvungi, resulting in the disappearance of several species, including buffaloes, monkeys, and antelopes, due to scorched earth becoming infertile. On 18 March 2014, a woman was shot in the stomach and an army officer was reported missing following a raid by gunmen in Bwegera. Witnesses say that the assailants entered the town at approximately 8:15 p.m. (Local time), firing shots in the air. Approximately 4,000 village residents fled Bwegera after the murder. On 21 April, five people were killed by unidentified gunmen in the Kakamba-Itara groupements over 70 kilometers south of Bukavu. Of these victims, the police commander based in Bwegera was killed in Kiringye, approximately ten kilometers from Sange.

On 18 October 2018, the United Nations Organization Stabilization Mission in the Democratic Republic of the Congo (MONUSCO) launched a community violence reduction project in Bwegera to combat community violence in Bwegera to support the socioeconomic reintegration of ex-combatants and youth at risk of rice and pig cultivation. In July 2022, nearly 90% of IDPs from the high and middle plateaus of Bafuliiru Chiefdom returned to their villages. Donat Bakuka Ngolikwenda, a commander of the national police detachment of the mobile intervention group, was dispatched with his troops to Bwegera to strengthen the security of the displaced persons who came in April 2021 from the high and middle plateaus of Uvira.

== Agriculture ==
The majority of the Bwegera village is an agricultural community and subsistence agriculture is a sustained source of revenue. Growing food crops such as cassava, beans, maize, soybeans, groundnuts, banana, sorghum, Irish potato, taro, sweet potatoes, onions, and tomatoes allow households to regain their means of existence. There's also a large livestock operation of cattle, pigs, goats, and poultry.
