= Kiringye =

Village in Bafuliiru Chiefdom, Uvira Territory

Kiringye is a village situated in the Lemera groupement within the Bafuliiru Chiefdom, Uvira Territory, South Kivu, Democratic Republic of the Congo. The village is located at an elevation of 928 meters and is near the localities of Luburule and Karenzu.

Agriculture is the main economic activity in the region, which provides local communities with self-sufficiency.

== History ==
The area was mainly inhabited by the Fuliru people and formed part of their Bafuliiru Chiefdom, which oversees several areas within Uvira Territory.

During the 1980s, Kiringye became known for its productive farming and its impact on the local economy. The village benefited from fertile ground and a climate that supported consistent crop growth, which helped it become one of the main farming areas in the region.

At the beginning of the First Congo War, Kiringye was used as a base by the Alliance of Democratic Forces for the Liberation of Congo-Zaire (AFDL). This alliance was supported by soldiers from Rwanda and Burundi, who entered the region to assist the Banyamulenge militia against the government of Mobutu Sese Seko. On 31 August 1997, government spokesperson Oscar Lugendo reported that Zairean forces had killed three Rwandan soldiers and captured five others in Kiringye. During the Second Congo War, 13 people, including the chief of Kiringye, were massacred on 6 August 1998. The violence then spread to the nearby village of Lwiburule.
