= Vira people =

Ethnic group in the Democratic Republic of the Congo

Bavira
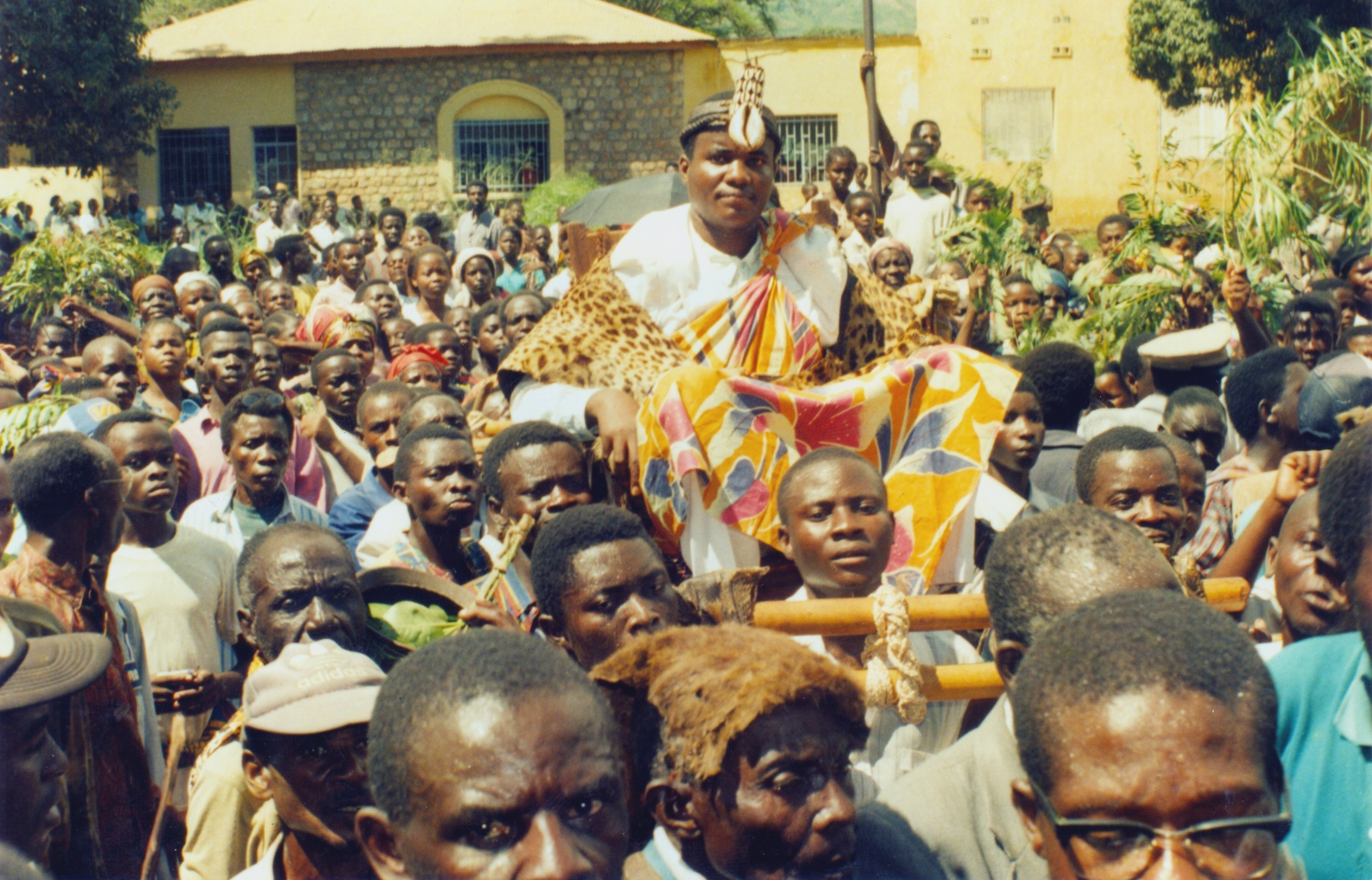
- King Lwegeleza III on the day of his coronation in 1997.

Languages
- Kivira • Fuliru • Kiswahili • French

Religion
- Christianity

Related ethnic groups
- Bembe • Fuliru • Rundi

Vira
- Person: Muvira
- People: Bavira
- Language: Kivira
- Country: Uvira

The Vira people or Bavira (in the plural) are one of the most numerous ethnic groups in the Eastern Democratic Republic of the Congo. These people are located in the region of Uvira in the East of the country, on the northeast coast of Lake Tanganyika at the border with Burundi. The Bavira are also known as Benembuga in Kivira (Bavira language), which means "authentic Uvira citizens."

The current king of the Bavira is Lwegeleza III (Edmond). He succeeded his father Mwami Lenghe Rugaza, who was assassinated in 1997 in the violent disorder which took place after the liberation of the DRC by Laurent-Désiré Kabila.

== Cultural identity ==
To be a Muvira (the singular of Bavira), one must belong by birth to one of the fifty families (clans) founder of the ethnic group. No other consideration is valid in this traditional society. And as Bavira are patriarchal, the lineage of the father determines membership in the group.

Anyone whose family, to say the clan, is part of many of these clans is Muvira, regardless of where they live now. And anyone whose clan is not this number of clans is not a Muvira whatever number of years that his family lives in the chiefdom of Bavira. The list of 51 clans that make up the people Bavira is just below.

== Kings Bavira ==
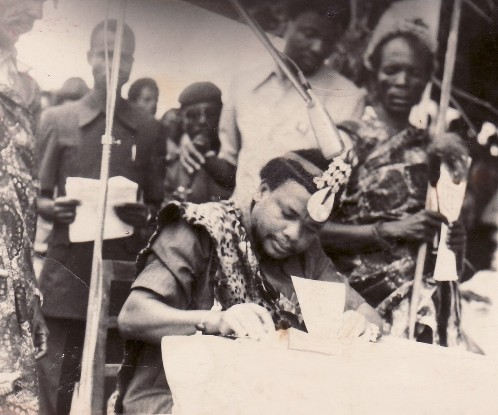
King Lenghe III Rugaza Kabale (father of current King Lwegeleza III) in 1987.

Since 1645, the Bavira have been ruled by the BeneLenghe dynasty. They are from the last king of the dynasty of ancient Balabwe strain, Mbuti Ilunga, who died in Katanga in 1645. His son Lenghe Ilungha took control of the state. Thus, the term BeneLenghe means the descendants of Lenghe. It is from him that we began counting the kings of Bavira.

1. Lenghe or Lenghe I Ilunga, son of Mbuti Ilunga and first king of the dynasty BeneLenghe (1645–1670), a 25 -year reign
2. Mubila Munanila or Munana son of Ilunga Lenghe I (1671–1709), 38 -year reign
3. Kibwe Mabingo (1709–1735), a 26 -year reign
4. Muluta I Kibwe (1735–1763), a 28 -year reign
5. Kinyunda Kye Lugongo (1763–1798), 35 years of reign
6. Mbuti II Lenge (1798–1830), 32 -year reign
7. Muluta II Muvuluma (1830–1871), 41 -year reign
8. Nambuza Mukangwa (1871–1897), a 26 -year reign
9. Muluta III Nakumika (1898–1932), a 34 -year reign
10. Lenghe II Kabale Mamboto Lwegeleza (1932–1945), a 13 -year reign
11. Lwegeleza I Kabale Mamboto (1945–1964), 19 -year reign
12. Lenghe III Kabale Rugaza Rampan Roman Geslin (1965–1996), 31 -year reign
13. Lwegeleza III Lenghe Edmond (1997–present)

== Clans of Bavira ==
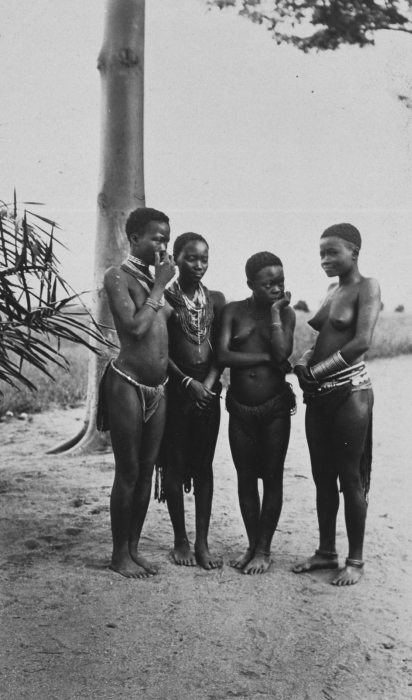
Vira children, 1913

1. Baanza village Kasenga
2. Babenga village Kigongo
3. Babinda village Kigongo
4. Babogwe village Kashombe
5. Babondo village Kibombo
6. Babugu village Kabimba
7. Babulwa village Kabimba
8. Babumba villages Bumba and Kamba
9. Babunda villages and Kabunda Kabindula
10. Bafumu villages Kasenga Kilomoni and Kanvira
11. Bafunda village Kimanga
12. Bagaja villages Uvira Centre and Mujaga
13. Baganda village Lugongo
14. Bagela village Kabimba
15. Bagendo village Katala
16. Bagezi village Kabimba
17. Bagotwe village Kigongo
18. Bagungu villages and Kanvira Kilomoni
19. Bahagwe village Kigongo
20. Bahala village Makobola
21. Bahalu villages and Makobola Natutwa
22. Bahang village Gomba
23. Bahinga , their former name Balama, villages Kabimba Lugongo and Ngaja
24. Bahonga village Kigongo
25. Bahofu village Kabimba
26. Bajombo villages and Bijombo Kitundu
27. Bajumbi villages Kitundu, Kiku and Mbigo
28. Bakali village Kabimba
29. Bakanga villages and Mugea Lugongo
30. Bakono villages Uvira Centre, Kirungu, Kayaja and Makobola . They have no connection with Bakono of Rwanda, the latter being Nilotic while Bakono Uvira are like all other Bantu Bajoba
31. Balambo villages Kigongo, Kihala, Kitundu, Katala and Bugizi
32. Baheta village Muheta, Katongo
33. Balega village Muheta
34. Balembwe villages and Rugembe Kalundu
35. Balibu village Katongo
36. Balila village Kabimba
37. ' Balizi' village Kitundu
38. Balingi village Kigongo

(a large part of the population was decimated by the floods of the river Kakumba in 1910)

1. Balunguti village Kigongo
2. Bangala (or Bahangala ), villages and Makobola Kabone
3. Banone villages and Kabimba Kitala
4. Bashambi ( not to be confused with Bashimbi which are Bafuliru ), villages and Kala Kalundu
5. Basinga village Kasinga
6. Basingwe village Musingwe
7. Batanga village Kasenga
8. Batala village Kitala
9. Batende village Kabimba
10. Batimbu villages and Kilibula Ruzozi ( Kalundu port)
11. Bavumi village Kishembwe
12. Baziba villages and Kifuta Kagozi
13. Bakabaga villages and Kabimba Kigongo
14. BeneLenghe ( sub-clan of the ancient Balabwe strain) villages Lugongo, Katala and Kala
15. Balabwe (clan that gave birth to BeneLenghe ) village Labwe.

== About the Balabwe clan ==
The case of Balabwe deserves explanation. Because there is the Balabwe the ancient strain and Balabwe the recent strain. The history of the Balabwe ancient strain is very long. It starts with the great king of kingdom theocratic of Bupemba known name Ilunga Kiluwe, also known in the name of Sango Wa Mpemba. This is the one that gave birth to the emperors of the second dynasty of the Luba Empire by his son, Prince Mdidi Kiluwe as tradition often recognized the name hunter.

This great king Bupemba (territory was transformed into Upemba National Park by the colonizers Belgium) was from the clan of Balabwe term meaning those who have received the anointing of God to reign. Mbidi his son, he also had descendants who continued to rule the kingdom of Bupemba, whose last king Mbuti Ilunga will be forced, because of the cruelty of his brothers emperors Empire Baluba it made war to flee his country Bupemba with his people. The decades that followed, some of his people adopt the name of Bavira when it is reflected both in the current country that give the name of Uvira, saying countries Bavira. < Br/>

In terms of the Balabwe recent strain she began in 1840 by Prince Namango brother of King Muluta 2. The king, having adopted the Muslim religion, lent strong support to Arab slave traders in his country and in neighboring countries at the time. He also had disputes with his big brother, the king, about slavery. He was fiercely opposed to the king to have a covenant with the Arabs in the trade of human beings. The King refused to give up its alliances with Arabas, whereupon her little brothers decided to opt out of his clan BeneLenghe Balabwe to return to the old clan of his ancestor.

After this fight, in 1840, left Namango Katala up and move to another land that the people giving the name of Muhungu, that is to say, a place of refuge. These Balabwe of recent strain BeneLenghe share with the country of Katala, height Rugenge (Kanvinvira). The village Rutemba also belongs to them. Muhungu of his son Mushaba Mbuti "Mulyama" from base to another location in the city Kitija, which today is in the Chiefdom of Bafuliru.

There are still traces its banana plantation, called "Kigundu kya Mulyama" (the banana plantation of Mulyama). The name Mulyama (who drinks until morning) was given to him in connection with his exaggerated consumption of the drink. When he landed in a village, he could not proceed without having finished all the drink that it contained, two glasses at his own expense, for all the villagers. Mulyama built several other cities in this part of the country including Katala (near Namirye) Mujaga (around Lemera) Ndegu (Katobo), etc. where he was installing his brothers Balabwe.

In the land of Katala, areas likely descendants of Namango include: Shora and Rutemba. But, most of their fields lie in what is today the Chiefdom of Bufuliru, as we have just seen. And in the Rusizi Plain Chiefdom, there is the whole country's Kagando and Kagozi. Luhindiza's son Mushaba Mbuti Mulyama refused to live in the cities which his father had founded, whose popular culture was essentially based on unabated drunkenness. He still lived with his grandfather in the land of Namango Muhungu. Then he returned to Katala their city of origin. Time after it based very close to Katala, his own city named Rutemba.

Note on Bahinga or Balama. Their original name Balama was given to them by other members of the tribe that the clan members lived a long time before dying. They were the praetorian guard of the king of Bavira since the flight of the people of the Luba empire. And later, when Mubila Munanila (Munana), son of King Ilungha Lenghe first moved the capital of Sanga ( current Nundu ) to Lugongo on the mountain that bears his name (Mt. Munanira overlooking the town of Uvira), the balama also moved to his side, in the same city as him. But then they got into the habit of going down the mountain to beg fry among clans fishermen settled on the shores of lake from Kilomoni up Kilibula: Bafumu, Bafunda, Bagaja, Bagungu, Balizi, Bakono, Balembwe, Batanga, Batimbu etc.

Additions based on ethnographic field data of 1949-50 gathered by Daniel Biebuyck:
