= Fuliru people =

Bantu ethnic group native to Central Africa

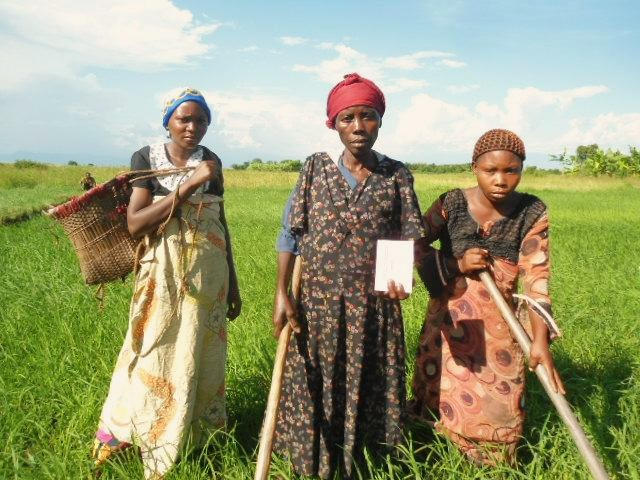
- Fuliru women farmers tending their fields in the Ruzizi Plain

Total population
- 615,000

Languages
- Kifuliiru, Kiswahili, French, and English

Religion
- Christianity, Fuliiru religion, Islam, and irreligious

Related ethnic groups
- Vira, Nyindu, Bashi

- Person: Mufuliru
- People: Bafuliru
- Language: Kifuliru
- Country: Bufuliru

The Fuliru people (also spelled Fuliiru) are a Bantu ethnic group native to the South Kivu province of the eastern region of the Democratic Republic of the Congo. They predominantly inhabit the Uvira Territory, forming the largest ethnic group within the Bafuliiru Chiefdom, located centrally and to the northwest. They also form the majority population in Ruzizi Plain Chiefdom, situated in the northeastern part of the territory near the borders with Rwanda and Burundi, where some Fuliru communities live. Many Fuliru also inhabit the city of Uvira, where they make up a significant proportion of the population.

According to a 2009 census, their population was estimated at over 250,000, while a 1999 estimate of Kifuliru-language speakers placed the number at 300,000. The Fuliru speak the Fuliru language, a branch of the Bantu subgroup within the Niger-Congo family, closely related to Vira, Shi, Havu, Tembo, and Nyindu. Occupationally, Fuliru primarily work in agriculture and herding, with a notable reputation in pottery and basket-weaving. Their handcrafted baskets are used for storage, decoration, and even as musical instruments.

The Fuliru, like many other communities in the eastern part of the DRC, face ongoing challenges related to land disputes, political marginalization, and human rights abuses. Fuliru women and girls are particularly vulnerable to sexual and gender-based violence amplified by the region's persistent armed conflicts, which have resulted in the prevalence of a pervasive culture of impunity.

== Ethnonym ==
According to Historian Jacques Depelchin, the Fuliiru and Vira earned reputations as skilled ironworkers, and the ethnonym Fuliiru likely derives from these abilities. The verb ku-fula means "to forge" or "to beat iron", and from this comes the noun Fuliiru, meaning "blacksmiths" or "ironworkers".

== Bafuliiru Chiefdom ==
At the onset of Belgian colonization, the establishment of chieftaincies was the primary method of governance. These chieftaincies were established with due respect to the customs and traditions of each area, particularly based on three principal criteria defined and established by the Belgian colonial administration as essential conditions for the establishment of any chieftaincy. This was done to prevent lawlessness and to avoid violating the ancestral realities that had existed for millennia. Belgian colonial administration's criteria for establishing chieftaincies varied based on the region and the ethnic group in question. The establishment of chieftaincies was often accompanied by the appointment of a local chief who was then tasked with maintaining law and order in the area, as well as ensuring the well-being of the local population. However, in multi-ethnic areas, the imposition of a single chief often created friction, as colonial authorities were forced to decide which ethnic group would hold authority. This sometimes led to tensions or even violent conflict. Moreover, colonial structures frequently reshaped identities; individuals could assume new ethnic affiliations depending on the chiefdom under which they resided. For instance, members of the Fuliiru community living within the Bavira Chiefdom might, over generations, come to identify as Vira. Similar dynamics unfolded in surrounding chiefdoms such as Burhinyi, Luwindja, Luindi, and Kaziba. Each ethnic group, however small, was assigned a chiefdom or a sector, if not, a grouping (groupement). The administrative territories were thus constituted within the limits of the chiefdom. The aim was to regroup "ethnic units" in their own geographical entities. This approach by the Belgian colonial administration was based on the principle of indirect rule, which aimed to maintain control over the local population through traditional rulers. This system was viewed as a means of preserving the existing social and political structures of the colonized societies while ensuring their loyalty to the colonial authorities.

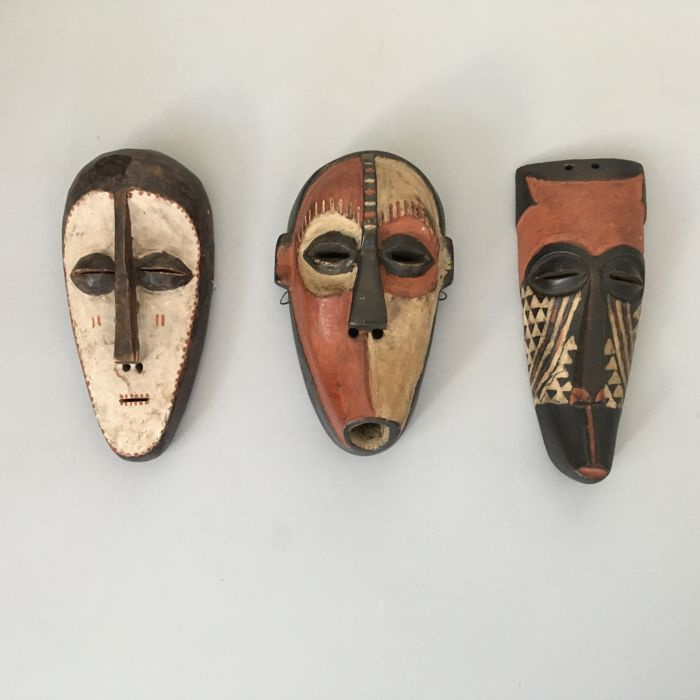
Fuliru traditional masks, November 2019

The Bembe and Buyu were both grouped in the Fizi Territory, which was further subdivided into five sectors, including Itombwe, Lulenge, Mutambala, Ndandja, and Tanganyika. Conversely, the Bafuliru Chiefdom borders Rwanda and Burundi through the Ruzizi Plain in the Uvira Territory. The sandy soil of the plain is suitable for growing crops such as groundnuts and cotton, with Luvungi, Lubarika, and Luberizi being particularly noteworthy areas for such cultivation. The Fuliru collectivity is situated in two distinct types of plateaus: the Middle Plateau and the High Plateau. The Middle Plateau spans between Luvungi and Mulenge, with the altitude gradually increasing from 100 m to 1800 meters. This plateau comprises several groupements and villages, including Namutiri, Ndolera, Bulaga, Langala, Bushokw, Bushuju, Butole, Lemera, Bwesho, Katala, Mulenge, and others. It is also a favorable environment for growing cassava, coffee, banana, beans and maize. The High Plateau, on the other hand, form a watershed between the tributaries of the Ulindi and the Elila rivers, as well as the torrents that flow into the Ruzizi River and Lake Tanganyika. The High Plateaus are characterized by a rugged landscape with steep slopes and elevations ranging from 1800 to 2700 meters. The main villages located on the High Plateaus include Kagongo, Kishusha, Mulobela, and Kashekezi. These villages are known for their cool climate and are suitable for the cultivation of crops such as Irish potatoes and beans. This plateau is mostly used for grazing cattle and is less populated compared to the Middle Plateau.

=== Bafuliiru groupements (groupings) ===
Bafuliiru Chiefdom is an officially recognized Decentralized Territorial Entity (Entité Territoriale Décentralisée, ETD) under the DRC's Constitution, adopted on 18 February 2006. The chiefdom operates under a dual system of governance that integrates traditional authority with decentralized administrative structures. At the head of the chiefdom is the Mwami (customary chief), who has customary and statutory powers. The Mwami is appointed according to local traditions and is supported by three Chief Aldermen (Notables), who assist in administrative responsibilities. Administratively, the chiefdom is divided into five groupements: Runingu, Itara-Luvungi, Lemera, Muhungu, and Kigoma. Each groupement is governed by a chef de groupement, appointed by the Mwami, and further subdivided into localités (villages), each headed by a chef de localité or chef de village, who serves as the local representative of the groupement chief.

The Muhungu groupement consists of the following villages:

- Kabondola
- Kagunga
- Kaholwa
- Kalemba
- Kasheke
- Kaluzi
- Kazimwe
- Kibumbu
- Kasanga
- Kihanda
- Mukololo
- Lugwaja
- Masango
- Muzinda
- Muhungu
- Namukanga
- Kiriba
- Butaho
- Kahwizi

The Kigoma groupement consists of the following villages:

- Bibangwa
- Bikenge
- Kukanga
- Bushajaga
- Kahungwe
- Butumba
- Kabere
- Karava
- Kalengera
- Kahololo
- Kalimba
- Karaguza
- Kahungwe
- Kasheke
- Kiryama
- Kanga
- Kashagala
- Kasenya
- Kishugwe
- Kigoma
- Lubembe
- Kihinga
- Mangwa
- Miduga
- Kitembe
- Mibere
- Kitija
- Muhanga
- Kabamba
- Mulenge
- Kaduma
- Mushojo
- Masango
- Kitoga
- Mashuba
- Mulama
- Kagaragara
- Ndegu,
- Rurambira
- Rugeje
- Rubuga
- Rusako
- Sogoti
- Taba
- Kabunambo

The Runingu groupement consists of the following villages:

- Katembo
- Kashatu
- Ruhito
- Ruhuha
- Namuziba
- Kasambura
- Katwenge
- Bulindwe
- Narumoka
- Kalindwe

The Itara-Luvungi groupement consists of the following villages:

- Bwegera
- Lubarika
- Kakamba
- Murunga
- Ndolera
- Katogota
- Luberizi
- Bulaga
- Luburule
- Bideka

The Lemera groupement consists of the following villages:

- Kiringye
- Kidote
- Langala
- Bwesho
- Mahungu or Mahungubwe
- Narunanga
- Namutiri
- Lungutu
- Kahanda
- Kigurwe
- Ndunda

Traditionally, Bafuliiru governance was centered around the Bwami system, a traditional institution that positioned the Mwami as the political and spiritual leader. Although his authority was regarded as nearly absolute, the Mwami relied on an organized royal court made up of various dignitaries and functionaries with specific roles. The Mugoli, or Nakima, was the Mwami's wife at the time of his coronation and held a ceremonial position. The Banjonga served as guardians of Bafuliiru customs and were responsible for crucial ceremonial duties such as overseeing the enthronement of the Mwami, announcing his death, and conducting his burial. They also held the responsibility of determining the next Mwami, with the most senior among them referred to as the Kabaka. The Bagigi served as the Mwami's inner circle of advisers, selected for their wisdom, loyalty, and discretion. The Balalizi had a military function, ensuring the safety of the Mwami and controlling access to the royal court, especially when receiving foreign guests. The Baganda, known for their obedience and reliability, were charged with carrying out the Mwami's directives and were often sent on important missions. Legal matters were handled by the Batwi b'emaja, who acted as customary judges within the chiefdom.

== Clans ==
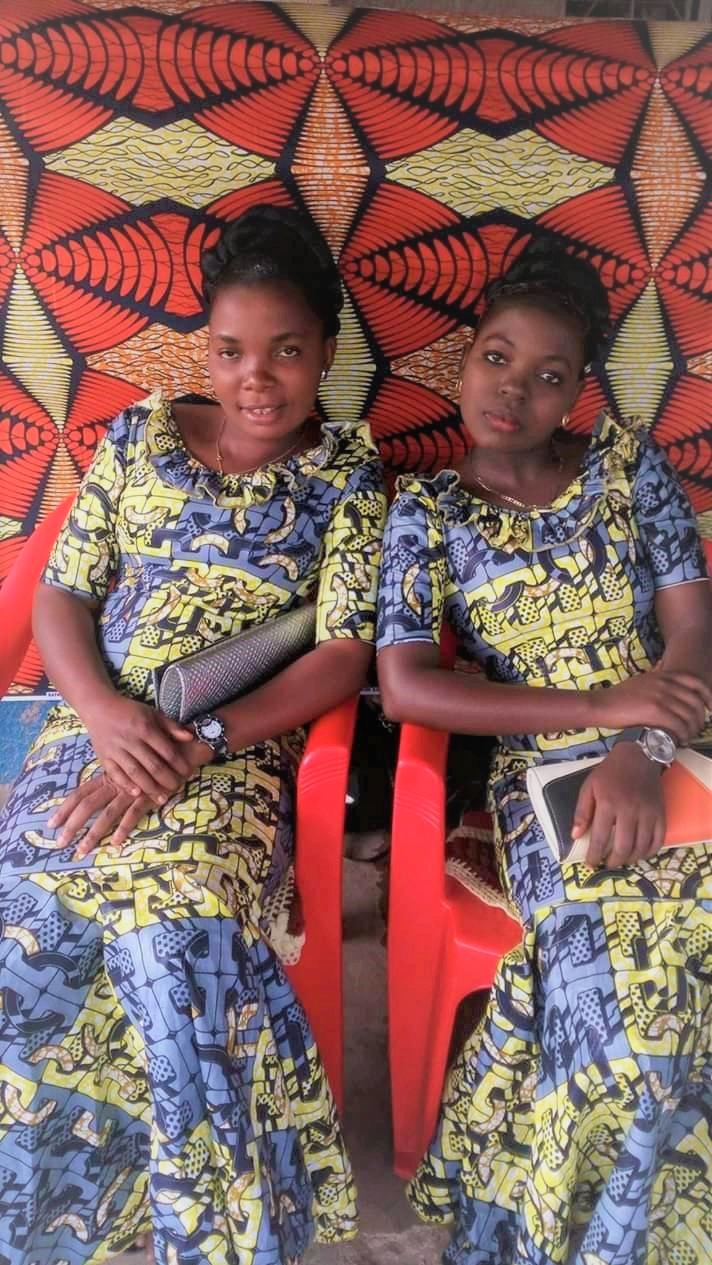
Fuliru women in Uvira

To be considered Mufuliru one must be born into one of the thirty-seven progenitor families (clans) of the ethnic group. The Fuliru people are made up of about 37 clans:

- Badaka
- Balabwe
- Bahatu
- Bahamba: The Bahambas are well known for their lineage from the royal family and have held leadership positions over the Batumba clan at some point in history.
- Bahange
- Bahembwe
- Bahofwa
- Bahundja
- Bahungu
- Bazige: The Bazige clan are believed to be descendants of Hutus from Burundi who were assimilated through exogamy.
- Baiga
- Bajojo
- Bakame
- Bakukulugu
- Bakuvi
- Balambo: According to Historian Jacques Depelchin, the Balambo trace their origins to the Banandola and are credited with bringing cattle into Fuliiru society. Their ancestor, Ndandola, is said to have migrated from a hill in Bukunzi, crossing the Ruzizi River with a large following of people and cattle. His journey took him to Nyangezi and later Kaziba, where he met Mwami Ngweshe. Refusing to remain there, he moved to Luhwindja and established himself as chief. This provoked opposition from Ngweshe, Kaziba, and Muganga, who sought to eliminate him, but Ndandola succeeded in defeating them. From Luhwindja, his descendants expanded further, with two men, Nyabuvuma and Mulambo, moving toward Lwindi.
- Balemera: Often regarded as "pre-historical" rather than historical actors, the Balemera clan is sometimes excluded from local memory as legitimate inhabitants. Oral traditions vary: some portray them as mythical, while others acknowledge them as displaced earlier occupants. A Fuliiru clan myth describes Kahamba Kalingishi, founder of the Bahamba lineage, as "the one who stole the land", suggesting that he seized territory from the Balemera.
- Balizi: The Balizi clan are believed to have migrated to the area from present-day Bunyoro in Uganda several centuries ago. They are primarily farmers.
- Bamioni
- Banakatanda: The Banakatanda clan is a matriarchal clan, with women traditionally holding positions of power and influence within the clan. Depelchin noted that the clan handles the funeral preparations for a deceased mwami. The process includes preparing the body, wrapping it in cowhide, and laying it on a wooden frame elevated above a fire. But these clan representatives hold responsibilities beyond burial rites. Known as banjoga in Kifuliiru and baluvi in Kivira, these individuals are also charged with identifying and initiating the successor to the deceased mwami. Their role in choosing and consecrating the new leader gives them considerable influence over the mwamiship (the institution or office of the mwami), though not over the mwami himself once installed. Notably, the clans from which these banjoga and baluvi are selected are believed to be the first settlers in the region, which may lend them historical legitimacy and ritual authority in the succession process.
- Banakyoyo
- Banamubamba
- Banamuganga
- Basamba
- Bashagakibone
- Bashimbi
- Bashamwa
- Bashashu
- Basizi: The Basizi clan are believed to be a subgroup of the Bahavu ethnic group
- Basozo: The Basozo clan originally came from Bugarama in Rwanda and intermarried with the wider Fuliru population to the point where their distinct identity was practically extinguished.
- Bashago
- Batere
- Batoké
- Batumba: The Batumba clan is a prominent royal lineage clan among the Bavira and Bafuliru. Mutumba was the traditional ruler of Batumba.
- Bavunye
- Bavurati
- Bazilangwe

== History ==
=== Origin ===
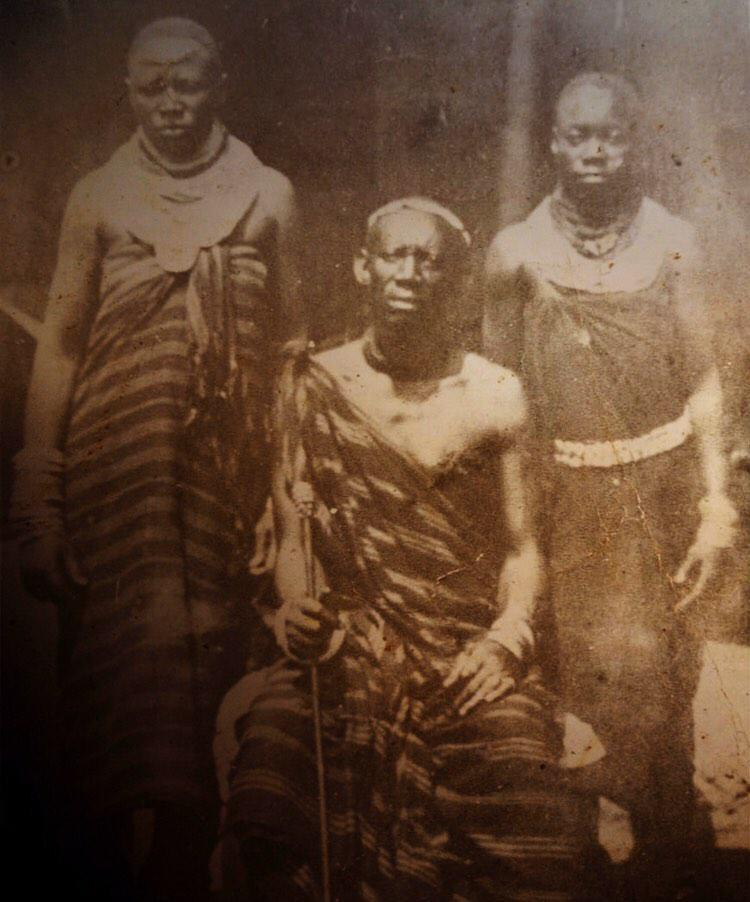
Mwami Nyamugira Mukogabwe II of Bafuliru Chiefdom in Lemera, Belgian Congo, circa 1925

The Fuliru have a unique history as one of the only highland Bantu groups to have formed a single, relatively small state that was highly centralized. Their exact origins remain disputed among scholars, largely because they do not possess fixed canonical texts recounting their origins. While several origin myths have been preserved through oral tradition, none has been established as a definitive literary narrative. Compared with other Fuliiru genres of oral tradition such as ifumo or migani, origin stories generated less creative elaboration but continue to attract sustained scholarly attention as logical points of entry into Fuliiru history. Accounts of origins were often vague or inconsistent. When researchers discovered that oral traditions prioritized other categories of recollection, systematic efforts to collect origin myths diminished. According to Congolese researcher Shimbi Kamba Katchelewa of the University of Montreal, as cited in Charles Katembo Kakozi's 2005 study Facteurs socio-politiques explicatifs des conflits dans la région des Grands Lacs Africains: Étude du cas d'Uvira en RDC à partir d'informateurs vivant à l'étranger, early Bafuliiru groups originating from Lwindi (now Lwindi Chiefdom) settled in areas such as Mulenge, Luvungi, and Lemera between the 10th and 14th centuries, migrations that historian Jacques Depelchin attributes to warfare and that later formed the basis of the "Hamba Kingdom" under paramount chieftaincy of the Bahamba clan.

Oral tradition situates the cradle of Bafuliiru migration in the central basin of the Lwalaba River, specifically at the mouth of the Ulindi River. This point of origin is believed to mark the initial stage of their dispersal into the highlands. Belgian colonial administrator René Loons identified mwami Kahamba Kalingishi as the founder of the modern Bafuliiru Chiefdom and suggested that he arrived in the region during the 16th century. However, other scholars, including historians Kingwengwe Mupe and Bosco Muchukiwa Rukakiza, date the Bafuliiru migration from Lwindi to the 17th century. Belgian colonial administrator Alfred Moeller de Laddersous, who conducted extensive studies of the Bantu ethnic groups in the eastern Belgian Congo, was among the first to document the Bafuliiru's presence in the Ruzizi Plain from the 17th century onwards. Depelchin questioned this date, explaining that they initially visited the plain only intermittently for hunting. He also suggested that "expansion" might describe their movement more accurately than "migration", since they maintained contact with their "original groups". Depelchin's genealogy of Fuliiru chiefs presents two possible chronologies, placing the beginning of Kahamba Kalingishi's reign around either 1820 or, in an alternative version, 1760; both dates are marked as uncertain. According to Depelchin, small Fuliiru groups, usually individual families, began settling in the Ruzizi Plain in the 1880s. The Fuliiru and Vira generally preferred the mountains, where their needs were readily met and the climate was considered healthier than in the plain.

=== Historical sources ===
The Bahamba clan, according to Moeller, migrated from the direction of Lwindi under the leadership of Chief Kikanwe, ultimately settling in what is now their present-day territory, which was uninhabited at the time. Moeller identifies the Bahamba as some of the earliest settlers in the region, settling in an area referred to as "Bufulero". Over time, the Bahamba changed their eponym from Bahamba (or Wahamba) to Bafuliru.

Other accounts describe the Fuliru and Vira as coming from the northeast, passing through Lwindi before settling in the region. Belgian geographer George Weis, who taught social sciences at the Université libre de Bruxelles and lectured at the University of Antwerp, stated that the Vira reportedly arrived first, during the seventeenth century. In this account, they traveled through Maniema, crossed Itombwe, and spread over much of what is now Uvira Territory. Their settlement extended along roughly 150 km of the mountain slopes bordering Lake Tanganyika and continuing north toward Ngweshe, from Makobola to Ngweshe. Vira tradition places Mount Munanira, directly above Uvira, at the center of this dispersal. They occupied the mountainside down to the lake, which reached its base before the piedmont developed. However, Weis stressed that knowledge of these movements was limited and remained uncertain. Cuypers also proposed that the journey may have involved a long detour through Maniema. According to this account, the group followed an ancestor named Nalwindi before dividing into two branches: the Bafuliru, led by Kahamba Kalingishi, settled in the Lemera highlands, while the Vira, under Kirungu, settled on Mount Munanira and later spread into the valley lowlands and across Uvira Territory.

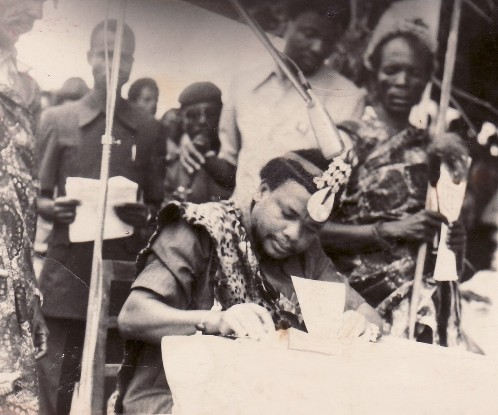
Mwami Lenghe III Rugaza Kabale (father of Mwami Lwegeleza III) in 1987.

For Depelchin, conflicting oral traditions made this settlement history difficult to establish. Accounts gathered in the 1920s and 1930s sometimes identified the Vira as the earliest settlers and described Chief Kirunga as leading his followers out of Maniema after repeated internal warfare and settling near Mount Munanira. He was accompanied by "seven notables", including Muhinga, Nawaganda, Mufumu, Nakabaka, Namundi, and Nakasiwa. The group gradually occupied land from Mulenge to the upper Sange River in the north and the Sandja River in the south, within present-day Fizi Territory. According to this tradition, settlement began about three centuries earlier, after which the "Banya-Lenge" abandoned their earlier identity and adopted the ethnonym "Ba-Vira". Sebakunzi Ntibibuka offers a related explanation, tracing Banyalenge (also called Benelenge) to Chief Lenge and placing his likely departure from Maniema in the seventeenth century. Depelchin recorded another account in which the Bahamba escaped warfare in Lwindi, settled in northern Uvira Territory, and displaced the Vira toward the Kiliba River, while the outbreaks of smallpox (karanda), leprosy (bandoro) and sleeping sickness were said to have devastated the Vira in the south. The chronology remains inconsistent, however, because the same tradition places the Vira's arrival under Lwamwe, which Depelchin stated would place their settlement after the Fuliiru were already established. Colonial administrators helped strengthen the separation between the Fuliiru and Vira by grouping populations along supposed ethnic lines and placing them under paramount chiefs in the Bafuliiru and Bavira chiefdoms. They sometimes overstated existing differences or created distinctions between communities to simplify governance. The Lenge clan's position within the Vira chiefly system, for example, owed more to colonial decisions than to agreement among local people. Depelchin argues that this process helped establish a separate Vira identity despite the two groups' close linguistic and cultural ties. He describes Kifuliiru and Kivira as mutually intelligible and closely related to Kinyindu. Their clan structures also overlap considerably, with the ruling clan forming the main distinction. Some researchers therefore regard the Vira as an extension of the Fuliiru rather than a separate ethnic group. Accounts passed down orally also stress their common origins and suggest that their differences became overstated during and after colonial rule.

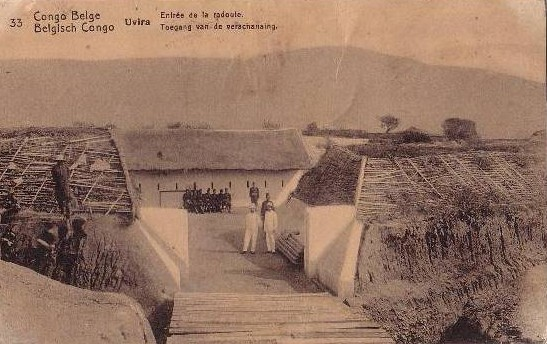
Uvira fortress entrance, Belgian Congo, 1910s

Chiefly authority was another source of disagreement. Depelchin argues that the system of paramount chiefs was largely established through colonial intervention. Although informants often claimed that it had existed for generations, he suggests that such accounts may have helped defend the position of those already in power, as colonial authorities sometimes selected chiefs who served their interests, leading rival factions to accuse one another of deception or colonial favoritism. These struggles were also complicated by pre-existing inter-clan rivalries.

The ethnonym Vira may also have developed through outside contact. Depelchin suggests that Swahili-Arab traders used it for people living near Uvira and that it may have derived from the word kivira, meaning "palm tree". This indicates that the Vira identity was, at least partially, shaped by external designations tied to geography rather than by an internally distinct sense of peoplehood. The Lenge clan's rise to prominence within the Vira, supported in part by their geographical location near Uvira and by their interactions with foreign traders and explorers, was challenged from within their own ranks and by the Bahamba. Disputes over leadership and precedence helped strengthen the sense that the two groups were separate.

Bosco Muchukiwa Rukakiza explains that Chief Luhama strengthened his position within the Bahamba dynasty by sharing his territory among his three sons. The division was intended to keep the area stable while allowing greater local control. Nyamugira, the eldest, governed the land stretching from Moira to the Munyovwe River. Mutahonga, the second son, received the territory from the Munyovwe to the Kise River, together with the eastern slopes of the Ruzizi Plain. Lusagara, the third son, took charge of the mountain regions.

The clans followed different paths. Some Balunga members left the Fuliiru to join the Bavira, while others, such as the Barundi-descended Bazige clan (also known as Bazeke or Bahungu), were assimilated after their chief Ngabwe received land from Chief Muluta. Oral accounts describe an independent Bazige Chiefdom in present-day Muhungu groupement, ruled by Mukobesi's son Kalunga. Mahina Mukogabwe, or Mukogabwe II, later conquered this chiefdom during his reign from 1914 to 1927. Although the two groups were brought together, Kalunga's lineage remained recognized to support trust and community unity. Marriage and economic ties gradually encouraged the Bazige to adopt Kifuliiru and accept Mukogabwe as their mwami.

=== Barundi migration to Bafuliiru territories ===
==== Migration ====
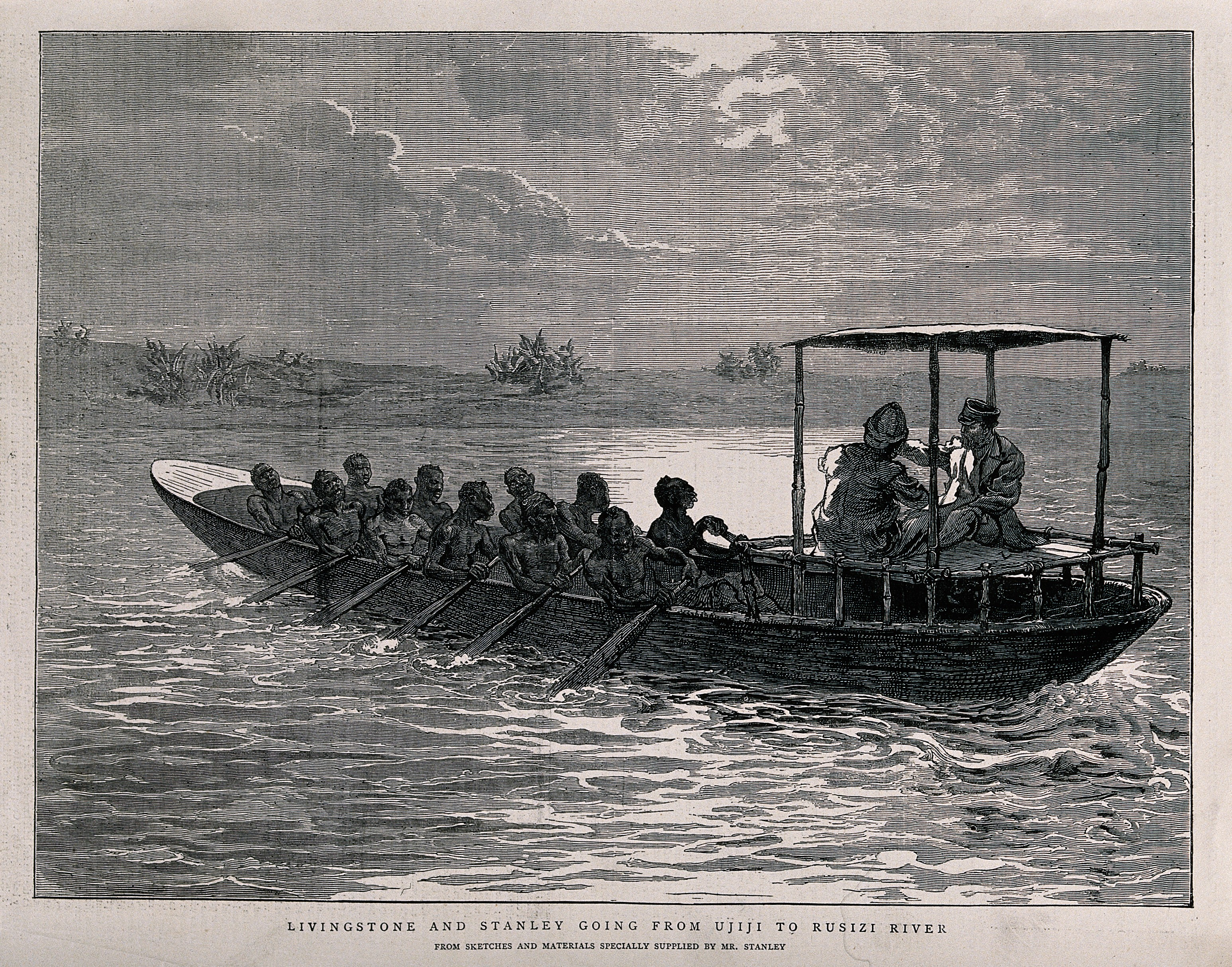
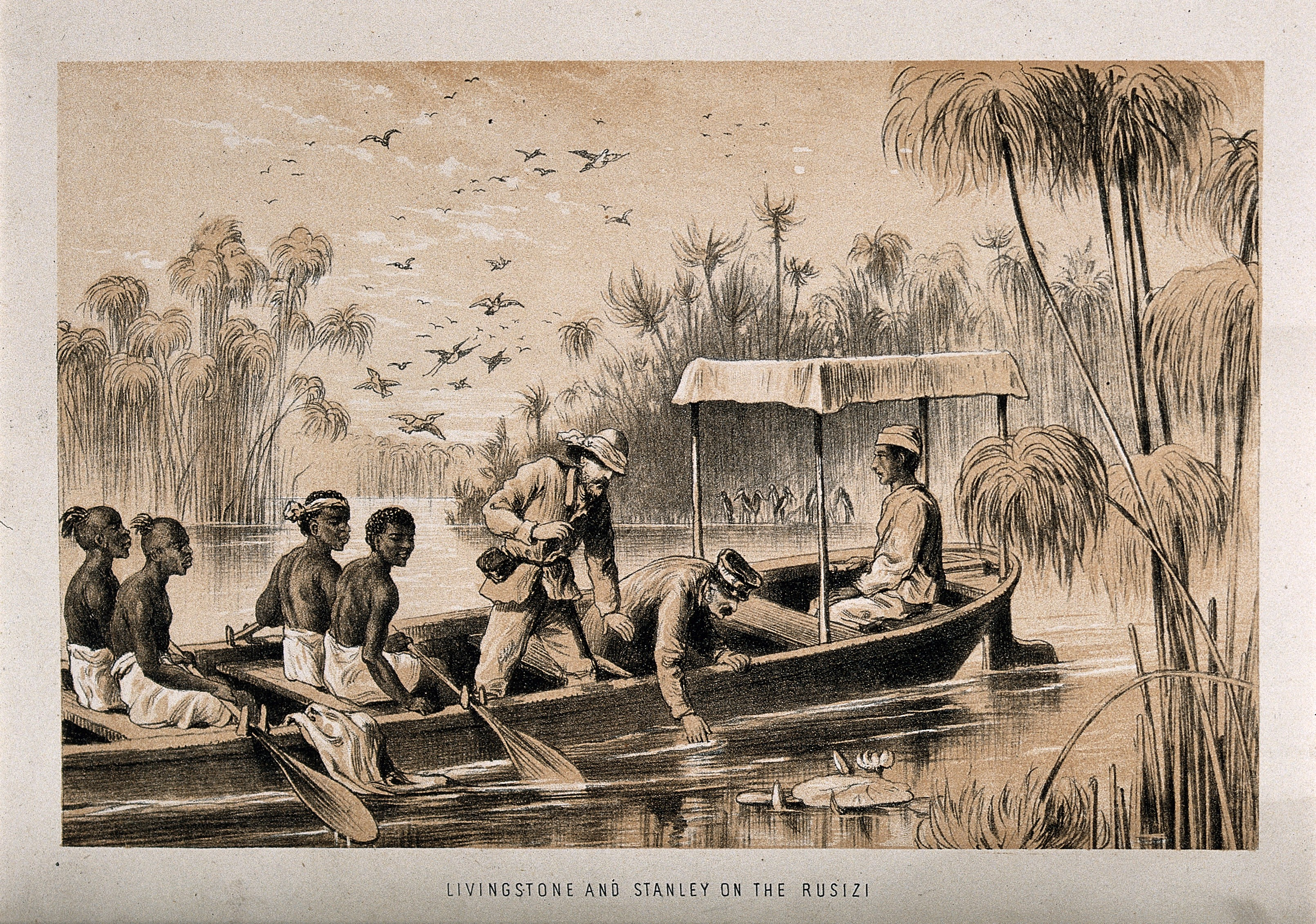
Explorers David Livingstone and Henry Morton Stanley along the Ruzizi River in the mid-19th century.

Driven by internal strife and dynastic rivalries, Hutu Barundi left the Kingdom of Burundi in the 19th century and migrated westward. Their journey brought them to the Ruzizi Plain. After crossing into the plain, they encountered land claimed by the Fuliiru, who demanded annual tribute in exchange for settlement rights. Oral traditions recount multiple waves of migration. Around 1800, a leader named "Ndorogwe" (Ntorogwe) spearheaded the first exodus in search of pasturelands. While some migrants established themselves near the river, Ntorogwe and his followers continued further south along Lake Tanganyika, reaching Kaboge. A few years later, Ntorogwe returned to Burundi, where he died near Cibitoke. After his death, his eldest son, Rugendeza, crossed the Ruzizi and reestablished himself at Kaboge. Increasing pressure on pasture resources, though likely not the sole reason, later prompted Rugendeza and his group to move northward toward "Kawezi" (Kawizi), approximately ten miles from Uvira. Rugendeza died around 1870 and was briefly succeeded by his eldest son, Lushimba, whose sudden death soon left leadership to Kinyoni.

A different version of the oral tradition attributes these movements more explicitly to disputes with the Burundian mwami Ntare IV Rutaganwa (d. 1852). In this account, Ntorogwe's initial migration was a response to tensions with the mwami, and after his death, Rugendeza became involved in a dispute with Ntare over tribute payments. Some accounts suggest that Rugendeza may have been poisoned as a result of this dispute, which led some to question whether Lushimba's death was natural. At the time, deaths were often attributed to witchcraft rather than natural causes, and Kinyoni appears to have interpreted these events as a warning directed at himself. His later decision to abandon land on the left bank of the Ruzizi was therefore motivated not only by the search for pasture but also by concerns for his personal safety. Another account broadly confirms this sequence but adds that Ntorogwe "did not directly rule over the territory he had conquered", instead placing two of his sons, "Maholo" and "Mukamba", in charge. It also specifies that the dispute with Ntare concerned tribute in the form of salt. Because few Fuliiru resided permanently in the Ruzizi Plain, Fuliiru mwami "Lwamwe" (also known as Nambako) permitted Kinyoni's group to settle there in exchange for annual payments, offering cattle, salt, and various goods to Fuliiru chiefs and Burundian monarchs.

==== Relationship ====
Depelchin argued that relations between the Bafuliiru and the Barundi before colonial rule were uneasy rather than peaceful, and although tensions existed, they did not harden into open hostility until European involvement altered the balance of power. European intervention contributed to the expansion of Barundi influence. In From Pre-capitalism to Imperialism: A History of Social and Economic Formations in Eastern Zaire, he cited a colonial official who observed that

"due to the lack of cohesion among the Furiiru [Fuliiru] in the northern section of the valley, [Kinyoni] took by force the land of Kabwika, [a Fuliiru chief], who had fled to Rwanda at the arrival of the Europeans".

When Europeans entered the region in 1894, their dealings were confined mainly to the Barundi, who by then constituted almost the entire population of the Ruzizi Plain, and, consequently, they became the primary source of porters and laborers. The Fuliiru, meanwhile, retreated to Rwanda, Lwindi, or the mountainous hinterland, as they saw little reason to work for unfamiliar foreigners who soon became associated with heavy taxation and harassment. Although colonial authorities recognized that Kinyoni's authority over Kabwika rested on a quasi-dependent relationship, Kinyoni and his followers were far more visible and gradually recognized as an independent chiefdom. Early interactions with European officials promoted generally positive views of the Barundi, who were considered more accessible as laborers and easier to tax than the Fuliiru. By contrast, the Fuliiru were consistently portrayed negatively, often labeled as intemperate, hot-tempered, and quarrelsome. While these depictions were exaggerated and unfair, they reflected the frustrations of colonial officials who repeatedly resorted to military "occupations of Bafuliiru to compel a resistant population to pay taxes". In the late 1940s, the Fuliiru began leaving the slopes of the Mitumba Mountains in large numbers, not due to direct coercion but because of economic pressures. This migration accelerated when their traditional forms of wealth, such as hoes, copper bracelets, and beads, lost value and were replaced by a rigid, imported monetary system that could not be adapted locally, with one of the few ways to obtain cash was through compulsory agricultural labor, particularly cotton cultivation, which was introduced in 1924. Meanwhile, colonial administration in the region had adopted a more structured form after the establishment of Uvira Territory on 18 August 1928, which was divided into three customary chiefdoms: Bafuliiru, Bavira, and Barundi. These divisions were subsequently delineated by Ordinance-Law No. 21/91 of 25 February 1938, which specified the corresponding territorial boundaries. By the 1940s, the movement of Fuliiru off the mountain slopes was so extensive that they came to outnumber the Barundi within the Barundi Chiefdom, and by 1949 this situation led to direct attempts to prevent any further Fuliiru settlement in the Ruzizi Plain. That year, colonial authorities outlined their policy on Fuliiru mobility and stressed the importance of limiting movement between the lowlands and the mountains while warning that relaxing such restrictions would severely damage the already exhausted valley soils and arguing that the land was being poorly managed. On these grounds, they maintained that the Fuliiru should remain in the mountains, where they believed adequate land resources still existed.

Unlike Banyarwanda authorities, who remained socially distant and deliberately categorized the Fuliiru as subordinate Hutu, the Barundi were unable to adopt a similar posture even if they had wished to do so, since a significant portion of their own population was Hutu. While Barundi society was not free of inequality, the sharp Tutsi–Hutu distinction had already begun to weaken in their regions of origin, particularly western Burundi, where many Hutu had gained economic influence through cattle ownership. Unlike in Rwanda, where cattle ownership became closely tied to Tutsi status, Burundi did not experience the same rigid social stratification. This difference was reflected in the social and economic arrangements the Barundi established after settling on the right bank of the Ruzizi River, where ethnic categories were applied with greater flexibility. Ongoing processes of social transformation reshaped patterns of authority and production. Some Barundi chiefs migrated specifically to escape the heavy tribute imposed by the Burundian mwami. However, by distancing themselves from royal authority, they also weakened their capacity to extract labor and resources from the Hutu under their control, as separation from centers of power reduced their ability to enforce compliance. Because ethnic classification played a relatively minor role in determining social status among the Barundi, they were more accommodating toward outsiders than were Tutsi migrants from Rwanda. The level of social organization and productive capacity among Barundi migrants closely resembled that of the Fuliiru in general, a shared social and economic foundation that helps explain why intermarriage between the Fuliiru and the Barundi was far more common, especially when compared to the far lower rate of marriage between the Fuliiru and the Banyarwanda. The close alignment of their agrarian systems, cattle ownership, and surplus control facilitated clan-level integration. The Zige clan, originally from Burundi, was assimilated by Bafuliiru.

==== Interethnic conflict ====
Nonetheless, relations between the Fuliiru and the Barundi were not entirely free of tension, and despite informants' tendencies to emphasize harmony, conflicts persisted at personal, social, and political levels. Disputes arose among chiefs, sub-chiefs, and their followers, as well as within and between ethnic groups. Accusations of witchcraft were common and often intensified disagreements. In fact, conflicts within each group appear to have occurred more frequently than interethnic clashes. Among the Fuliiru, disputes such as those involving Matakambo and Kabwika, or Ngabwe and Mukogabwe, were prominent. Before these events and prior to the First World War, Nyamugira I, who had taken refuge in Lwindi during the severe drought of 1897, suspected that Europeans had confronted Rugaju in an attempt to restore him through colonial authority. Katembo, a highly respected elder among the Fuliiru, later recounted having fought alongside Ruhugi, a Fuliiru sub-chief backed by a large Barundi following, against another Fuliiru chief, Muzima.

Some of the most often cited interethnic conflicts occurred between Katiagulu (Rundi) and Nyamugira I (Fuliiru) in 1913, and later between Rubisha (Rundi) and Mukogabwe (Fuliiru) in 1921. However, ethnic affiliation was not always the primary factor driving these confrontations. A notable example is the Barundi, who fought alongside Ruhugi against Muzima. Serving under a chief or sub-chief from a different ethnic group was fairly typical. Often, material interests, particularly access to cattle, proved more decisive than ethnic loyalty. Many clashes stemmed from disputes over land and livestock. For instance, in 1920 and again in 1961–62, the Fuliiru engaged the Barundi over perceived encroachments on territory they considered rightfully theirs. The 1961–62 clashes began when the Barundi Chiefdom was renamed the Ruzizi Plain Chiefdom under pressure from the Bafuliiru, a decision that provoked opposition among the Barundi and eventually led to armed conflict. Earlier records also accentuate cattle-raiding expeditions in which Mukogabwe played a prominent role. Colonial authorities also intensified land disputes, as exemplified by the 1920 "Burakashwa" outbreak, with Barundi in Mutarule attributing the violence to Rundi chief Bunieniere's expansionist ambitions while Europeans believed Kabwika was responsible. Katembo, a wealthy trader, initially supported Ruhugi in a violent conflict against Muzima, but after Ruhugi's defeat, he relocated to the Ruzizi Plain Chiefdom. His wealth allowed him to marry Ndukumwami's daughter, an influential Rundi sub-chief, and he was subsequently appointed village chief. Similarly, Muyengo, another prominent Fuliiru trader, left Mukogabwe's oppressive rule under the "nyaga" principle to settle in Ruzizi Plain Chiefdom. While Katembo and Muyengo were particularly notable, their experiences were not unique, as many Fuliiru moved for the economic benefits of cotton cultivation, access to fertile land, and superior pasture for cattle, all of which were concentrated in the Ruzizi Plain Chiefdom. Within the Ruzizi Plain Chiefdom, no leader applied the "nyaga" principle as rigorously as Mukogabwe. His cattle raids helped prompt earlier Banyarwanda departures to the Itombwe Mountains and forced Muyengo to flee his authority to protect their assets. While many accounts depict Mukogabwe's leadership as harsh, even despotic, Depelchin argued that his actions must be viewed in light of the period's social and political realities. Prior to sustained interaction with Banyarwanda and Barundi societies, the Fuliiru had limited experience with the broader political and social significance of cattle. According to Depelchin, it is therefore plausible that Mukogabwe's confiscations were motivated by a concern that people with large herds might translate their economic assets into political influence.

Despite their many cultural and social similarities, the Fuliiru and the Barundi recognized themselves as distinct groups, although some oral accounts emphasize a shared origin in Lwindi. This reflects a broader understanding of common historical experience, particularly in contrast to colonial powers. Because colonial authorities maintained exclusive dominance and ethnical separation, they were seen as fundamentally different from any preexisting local society. Even with this awareness, ethnic prejudices and stereotypes persisted, and the Barundi, for instance, created a myth that gave the ethnonym Fuliiru a negative connotation. The Fuliiru did not develop an equivalent linguistic critique, but they nonetheless portrayed the Barundi as untrustworthy and "vindictive". Compared with the 1961–62 outbreak of violence, expressions of ethnic bias were relatively minor. Depelchin noted that the conflict essentially served as a release of long-standing grievances, with the Fuliiru's anger being particularly intense due to land dispossession worsened by the ongoing economic downturn. Human casualties appear to have been limited; rather than targeting people, the Fuliiru primarily raided Barundi livestock. By this time, intermarriage, friendship networks, and cattle exchanges had intertwined Barundi and Fuliiru in the Ruzizi Plain, and, as a result, many inhabitants of both groups in the valley were stunned by the violence and largely remained uninvolved. Most of the attacks were carried out by Fuliiru from the mountainous regions, often without support from their co-ethnics in the Ruzizi Plain. Depelchin's analysis then suggests that labeling the conflict purely as "tribal" would be misleading.

Mountain-dwelling Fuliiru were most affected by the restrictions imposed by the Barundi settlement in the Ruzizi Plain, which had earlier prompted colonial authorities to limit migration from the mountains into the valley. During the 1961–62 clashes, Fuliiru also hoped that forcing the Barundi back across the Ruzizi River would free up additional arable land, as they recalled the colonial administration's role in creating the Ruzizi Plain Chiefdom on what they considered Fuliiru territory. In the early post-independence years, Barundi were often urged to "go back home", a phrase that echoed the language previously used against Europeans. By 1964, widespread disillusionment with the outcomes of independence in Uvira Territory erupted, fueled by politicians associated with Patrice Lumumba's party. Widespread anger targeted government officials and those perceived as benefiting from the new regime. Only a few Barundi joined the rebels. When indiscriminate attacks extended to anyone owning even small numbers of cattle, a mass flight across the Ruzizi River happened, with Fuliiru and Barundi leaving together. What stands out in the aftermath of the 1964 Kwilu rebellion is the widespread reluctance to discuss the events and the dominant sentiment of compassion toward those considered misled. By the 1970s, former adversaries lived side by side in the same villages. People who felt their actions were unforgivable either returned to Burundi or relocated elsewhere due to social shame. The Barundi did not publicly blame the Fuliiru for forming the majority of the rebel forces. Depelchin points out that foreign media and many superficial scholars have long perpetuated the myth that African conflicts are inherently "tribal". In the Ruzizi Plain, however, conflicts between ethnic groups have been less frequent than disputes within the same ethnic groups. When the Fuliiru told Banyarwanda and Barundi to "go home" like Europeans, it was not a sign of deep-seated ethnic animosity, but a reaction to frustrations generated by colonial policies rather than longstanding social or historical tensions, and while such myths may have some grounding in Barundi–Bafuliiru relations, they hold no comparable basis for Fuliiru–Vira relations.

=== Banyarwanda migration ===
During the period of European penetration, the Banyarwanda, now commonly referred to as "Banyamulenge", emerged as a significant group in the region. The term "Banyarwanda" includes Hutus, Tutsis, and Twa people from Rwanda, who share the same common language and cultural heritage. In traditional Rwandan society, a feudal system existed in which Hutus were expected to leave their land available for Tutsis to graze their cows. This arrangement was enforced through a system of clientelism, where Tutsis loaned their cows to Hutus, who in turn were required to lend their land. Wealth was measured by the number of cows one possessed, and the richest Tutsis had the largest herds. At the top of this social hierarchy was the king, known as the "Mwami", who was believed to possess divine powers and symbolized national unity. The king surrounded himself with Tutsi warlords and Hutu advisers who oversaw the distribution of land. Over time, the Tutsis established a system of serfdom that further marginalized the Hutu. The Belgian colonial administration formalized and solidified this social system, ultimately leading to its being perceived as an ethnic divide between Hutus and Tutsis.

During the reign of mwami Kigeli IV Rwabugiri, the Kingdom of Rwanda pursued an aggressive territorial expansion strategy. Rwabugiri's military campaigns, aimed at consolidating control over neighboring regions, placed considerable strain on the kingdom's resources. To support these efforts, Rwabugiri resorted to seizing large herds of cattle. In response, Tutsi populations in the Kinyaga Province fled in an attempt to protect their livestock. These Tutsi populations eventually crossed the Ruzizi River and first settled in the area of Kakamba, located within the current Itara/Luvungi groupement of the Bafuliiru Chiefdom. However, the climate in this region, which was far less conducive to their highland lifestyle and the well-being of their cattle, proved unbearable. Surrounded by mountain ranges and longing for the familiar conditions of their former homeland, the Tutsi gradually migrated toward the slopes and eventually settled in Mulenge. These Tutsi herders were granted grazing land in exchange for an animal tribute to the mwami of the Fuliru. For many years, Mulenge became a quasi-capital for the Banyarwanda, and the term "Banya-Mulenge" came to refer to those who remained in the area. Economic ties included the exchange of staples such as cassava and maize for products like banana beer, milk, or livestock. These transactions often carried a social dimension, as the exchange of gifts was interpreted as an expression of friendship. Attempts by the Tutsi to replicate Rwandan socio-economic institutions such as ubuhake met with limited success. Unlike in Rwanda, where Tutsi elites could exploit Hutu cultivators, Fuliru farmers retained ownership of their land and control of their surplus production. They could choose to sell their crops locally or trade with Banyamulenge in pursuit of cattle, which were highly valued as a means of securing marriage alliances and enhancing social status. By the early 1970s, however, the balance of exchange became increasingly unfavorable for the Fuliru. Whereas thirty baskets of cassava had previously sufficed to obtain a cow, by 1972 the price had risen to fifty-two baskets. This inflation mirrored the destruction of Banyamulenge herds during the 1964 rebellion and wider economic pressures. Fuliru farmers, facing growing scarcity of arable land, found it increasingly difficult to expand cultivation and meet the higher costs of cattle acquisition. Cattle nevertheless remained central to the cultural and economic life of both groups.

For the Banyamulenge, livestock represented wealth, power, and prestige, while their expertise in animal husbandry made them the region's quasi-veterinarians. Many Fuliru entrusted their herds to Tutsi herders, who by custom received milk and occasionally calves from the animals placed under their care. For the Fuliru, cattle were valued primarily as commodities that could provide an escape from subsistence agriculture and a pathway to upward mobility. The destruction of herds during the 1964 rebellion compelled some Tutsi to adopt roles as agricultural laborers for wealthier Fuliru households. Meanwhile, the gradual penetration of capitalist modes of production elevated the importance of cash as a measure of wealth. By this time, cattle ownership, once the ultimate symbol of status, increasingly became a means to acquire cash.

=== Ethnic tensions in the First and Second Congo Wars ===
In the early stages of the First Congo War, a large contingent of Banyamulenge armed forces entered Bafuliiru Chiefdom in support of the Alliance of Democratic Forces for the Liberation of Congo (AFDL). Although this intervention did strengthen the AFDL's military position, it was accompanied by widespread violence against civilians, as clashes between AFDL-aligned forces, often supported by the Rwandan Patriotic Army (RPA) and Burundian allies, led to a series of massacres, reprisals, and forced displacements across Uvira Territory and surrounding regions. On 6 October, Banyamulenge armed units killed over 50 civilians in Kidoti, some by shrapnel and others after forcing them to dig their own graves. On the same day, violence reached Lemera, where dozens of civilians, medical personnel, and wounded soldiers were massacred at Lemera Hospital, which was later looted. On 18 October, AFDL-RPA forces killed at least 88 civilians in Kiliba, many of whom were unable to flee after the town's eight gendarmes had withdrawn. Kiliba was also looted before their departure. The International Committee of the Red Cross (ICRC) documented 88 victims, 15 of whom were buried in Uvira. That same day, at least 51 civilians were killed in Bwegera after fleeing FAZ forces; they were intercepted while attempting to reach the mountains near Kiringye. The ICRC later buried the victims in mass graves.

On 20 October 1996, coordinated operations by AFDL, RPA, and Burundian forces targeted several refugee camps in Uvira Territory, including Itara I and II, Katala, and Kanganiro near Luvungi. These attacks involved heavy weapons and caused mass casualties among refugees, many of whom were unable to escape. Survivors reported executions of fleeing civilians, destruction of shelters, and the forced burial of victims in mass graves. Additional killings were recorded in Luvingi and Rubenga, where refugees and Zairean civilians were killed while attempting to cross toward Burundi, with some bodies reportedly disposed of in the Ruzizi River. On 21 October, violence continued at Lubarika camp and surrounding village, where numerous Rwandan and Burundian refugees and Zairean civilians were killed, and survivors were forced to dig four mass graves. In Kakumbukumbu, located five kilometers from Lubarika, soldiers allegedly burned 30 refugees alive inside a house.

The capture of Uvira on 25 October 1996 by AFDL-RPA-Burundian forces was similarly marked by indiscriminate killings of hundreds of people, including refugees and Zairean civilians suspected of affiliation with Mayi-Mayi militias. In the following months, the conflict further intensified social disruption, including the recruitment of children by AFDL–RPA forces across Uvira Territory, Fizi Territory, and Bukavu. Recruitment in Bukavu took place notably at the AFDL headquarters in the Lolango Building on Avenue Maniema. Child soldiers were trained in Kidoti before being deployed to frontline operations. Between 1 and 2 November, around 250 civilians, including more than 200 refugees and approximately 30 Zairean nationals, were indiscriminately killed in Ndunda, a village near the Burundian border. Refugees had sought refuge there, expecting protection from the CNDD-FDD (National Council for the Defense of Democracy–Forces for the Defense of Democracy), which was reportedly active in the area. During the attack, some refugees drowned in the Ruzizi River while attempting to escape. Zairean villagers were also killed, as they were accused by the attackers of sheltering or collaborating with CNDD-FDD fighters. On 26 May 1997 in Uvira, AFDL-RPA forces killed 126 civilians during a protest against the killing of eight people allegedly by members of the new AFDL security forces. After the incident, troops secured the area and disposed of most bodies in two mass graves located in the "Biens mal-acquis" district, where their headquarters was situated. Eight bodies were recovered by residents and buried in the following days.

During the Second Congo War, Uvira Territory saw significant civilian deaths and displacement. Forces of the RCD-Goma, through its military wing, the Armée Nationale Congolaise (ANC), quickly seized major urban centers alongside the RPA and FAB, but faced persistent resistance in rural areas. Their ties to the Tutsi and Banyamulenge populations, dependence on Rwandan assistance, and abuses committed by their forces led to growing resentment among other local communities. Many youths responded by joining Mayi-Mayi militias or forming new armed groups like Mudundu 40 in Walungu Territory. Certain factions collaborated with Hutu rebel organizations, including ALiR and CNDD-FDD. While some Mayi-Mayi leaders, including General Padiri and Colonel Dunia of the Forces d'Autodéfense Populaires (FAP), received limited government support, the majority functioned autonomously. Military reprisals by ANC, RPA, and FAB forces against these groups often involved aggressive sweeps, sexual violence, and systematic targeting of noncombatants.

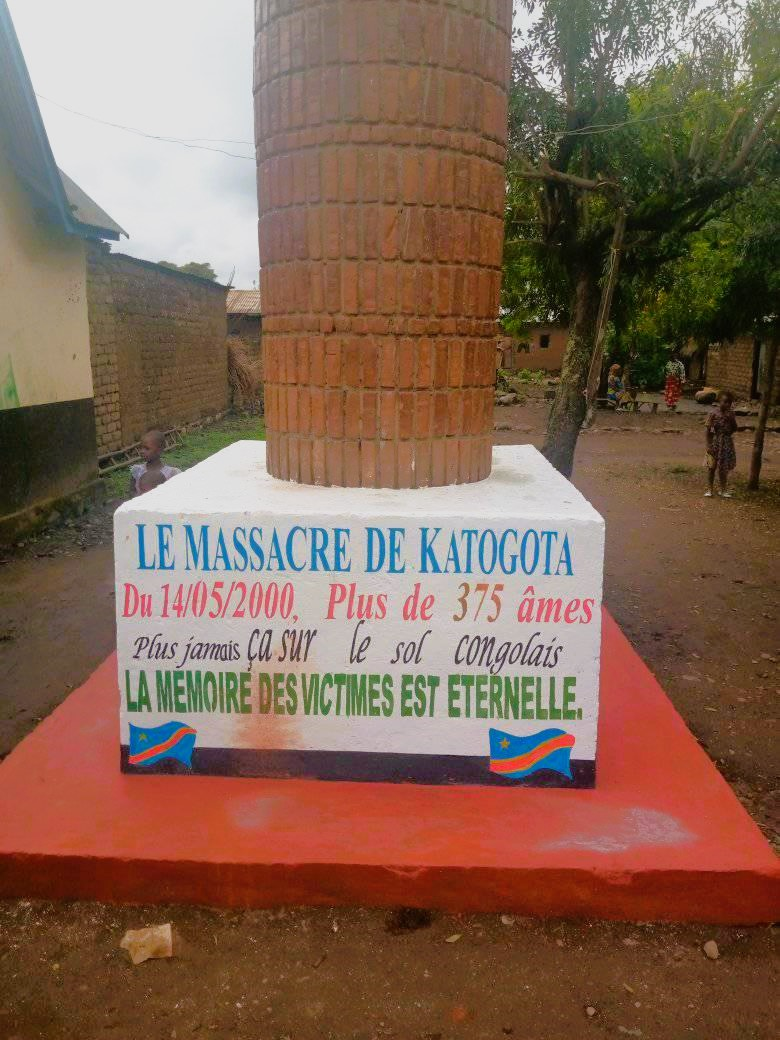
Monument of the Katogota massacre

In August 1998, as fighting escalated, ANC, RPA, and FAB forces carried out a series of killings in and around Uvira. On 6 August, dozens of civilians were killed during military operations, with many shot, stabbed, or killed while trying to escape. Accounts also describe widespread sexual violence during these operations. On the same day, ANC soldiers executed 13 people, including the Kiringye chief, in Lwiburule, with others killed inside his home. In separate incidents that day, ANC and RPA forces killed 15 civilians across the villages of Kivovo, Kigongo, and Kalungwe. The killings happened near the Kalundu Port and the sites of the SEP Congo (Services des Entreprises Pétrolières Congolaises), after which local youth and ICRC workers were forced to bury the victims in mass graves. In October 1998, Ladislas Matalambu, a former Mulenge post chief, was killed on the evening of 1 October, followed by the assassination of Alexis Deyidedi, former administrative secretary of the Bafuliiru Chiefdom, late on 2 October. Between 30 December 1998 and 2 January 1999, ANC, RPA, and FAB troops killed more than 800 civilians in the villages of Makobola II, Bangwe, Katuta, Mikunga, and Kashekezi in Fizi Territory. On 14 May 2000, ANC forces carried out another mass killing in Katogota, where they arrived in a truck and systematically executed villagers, some of whom were killed by gunfire and others by burning them alive in their homes. The area was sealed off for several days as bodies were burned or thrown into the Ruzizi River, with estimates placing the death toll above 300–400. On 12 September 2000, ANC soldiers based in Mutarule attacked a bus traveling between Rubanga and Sange, which resulted in the deaths of 16 civilians, and executed at least three additional people in Katekama village near Sange.

=== Post-Congo Wars ===
In June 2014, 35 Fuliru were killed in an attack on the town of Mutarule. The attack was believed to be ethnically motivated. The massacres were carried out mainly by Barundi and Banyamulenge rebel groups in a determined, planned, systematic and methodical manner, and were inspired by ethnic hatred. In January 2019, Twirwaneho and Gumino, a Banyamulenge rebel groups, reportedly torched homes and property belonging to the Bafuliru in the village of Babengwa. Between February 2019 and 2020, a large number of Bafuliru were killed and displaced, leading them to the Bijombo camp in Bavira Chiefdom of Uvira Territory. Despite efforts to prioritize and act on serious cases in the immediate aftermath of the ethnic violence, there have been few prosecutions and fewer convictions, as well as a near total lack of investigations of those who organized and financed the violence.

== Culture ==
=== Language ===
Kifuliru is a member of the Bantu branch of the Niger-Congo language family. The English linguist Malcolm Guthrie classified it in the D50 subgroup along with Shi, Havu, Vira, Tembo, and Nyindu, placing Kifuliru among the African Great Lakes Bantu languages. Achille Emile Meeussen and linguists at the Royal Museum for Central Africa in Tervuren categorized Kifuliru under J54, describing it as an "interlacustrine" language. The Fuliru are connected to the Vira in a Fuliru-Vira culture cluster. Both ethnic groups are interlacustrine, living between the African Great Lakes. Kifuliru is commonly spoken in the Uvira Territory, with over 275,000 speakers. It is mutually intelligible with several neighboring languages, including Nyindu and Vira, with which it shares 90% lexical similarity, and Shi, with which it has about 70% lexical similarity.

Kivuluga, a Shi-influenced dialect of Kifuliru spoken mainly in the Itara–Luvungi groupement, developed through close contact between speakers of the two languages.

=== Economy ===
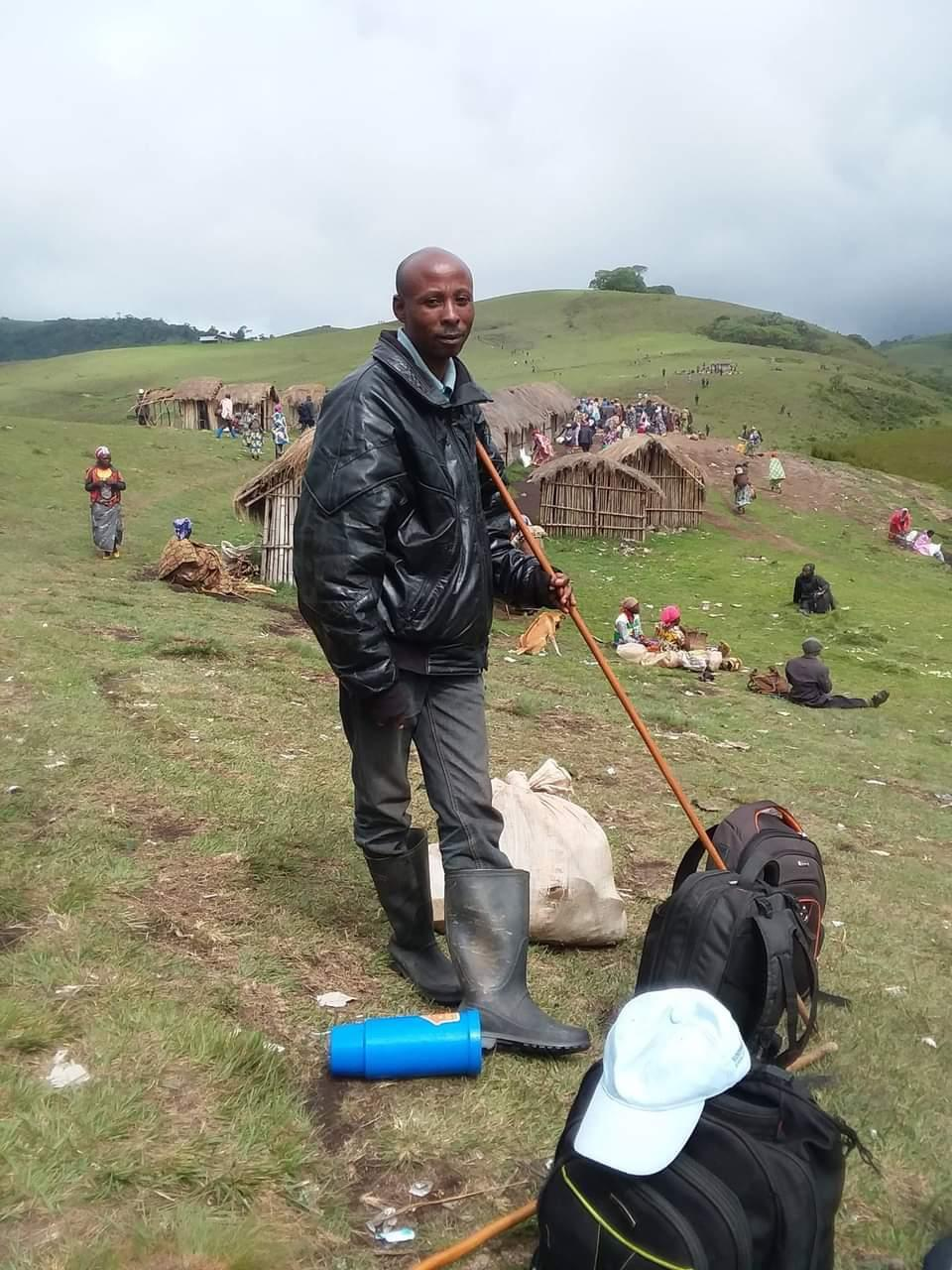
Fuliru herdsman in the Mitamba market of the Bijombo groupement of Bavira Chiefdom

==== Manioc and banana ====
The Bafuliru economy relies heavily on agriculture, with their lands in the South Kivu province among the most densely cultivated in the country. More than 90% of the population makes their livelihood by producing food crops or through industrial work involving the processing of crops.

According to Bafuliru folklore, cassava originated in the Lwindi Chiefdom and was introduced there during their migration. A staple crop across the Ruzizi Plain and Bafuliru Chiefdom, cassava is highly valued for its edible roots and leaves and stems used as lumber. Cassava fields are regarded as prized assets. Beyond these uses, the crop reportedly accounts for 80 percent of tax revenue, funding community and zone treasuries and supporting local markets.

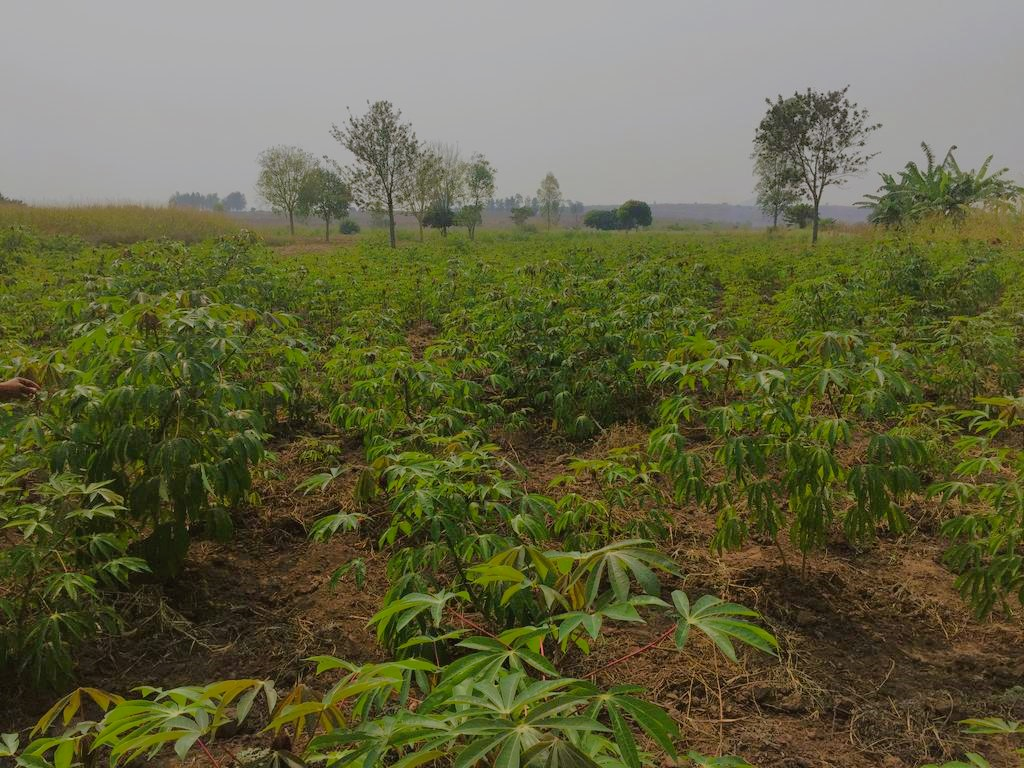
Advancements in cassava production in Katogota

A versatile crop, the banana plant thrives throughout most of Bafuliru Chiefdom. Fuliru mythology holds that strenuous activities require a banana. At weddings or after mourning, a prospective spouse must offer attendees a pitcher of fermented banana and sorghum beverage, known as Kasigisi, before speaking meaningfully. Called "I mbindi ya mavu yo kudeterakwo" in Kifuliru, the offering means "the pitcher of alcohol that allows you to speak". Ritually associated with childbirth, banana fields sometimes serve as burial sites for umbilical cords. Two months later, family and friends gather to pour Kasigisi over the burial mound in celebration.

==== Rice, bean, and corn ====
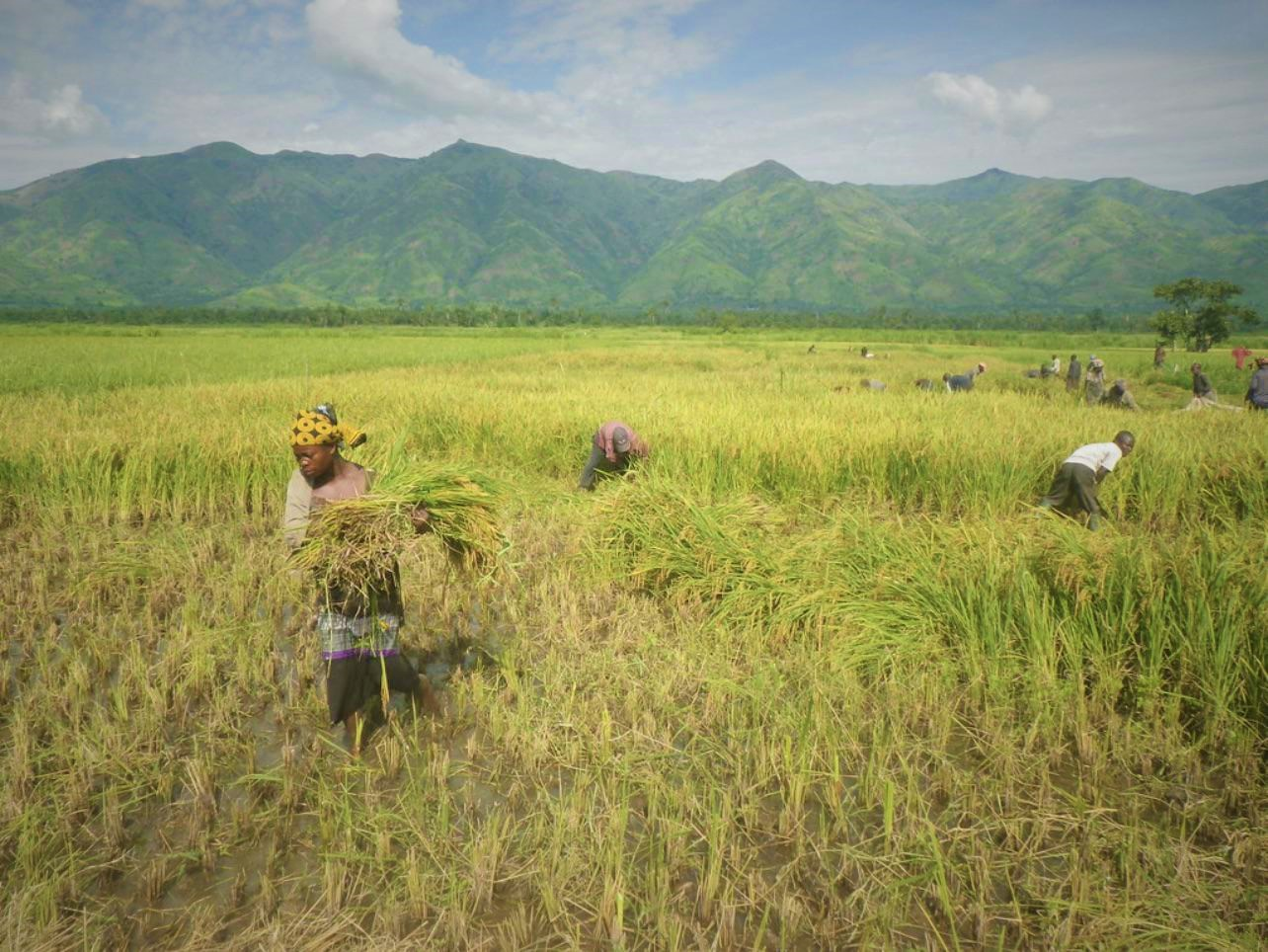
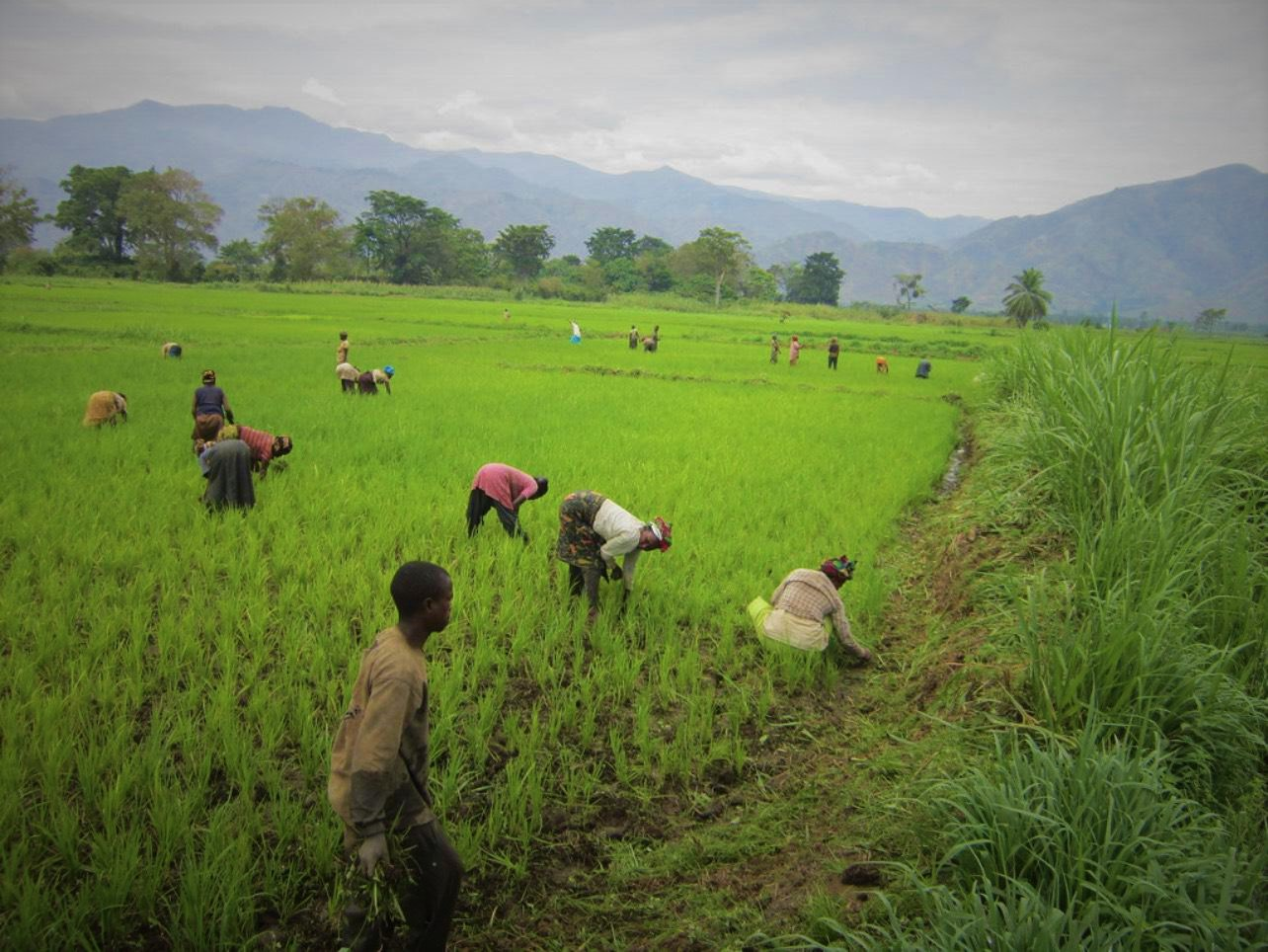
Rice cultivation in the Ruzizi Plain, Uvira Territory

Rice grown in the Bafuliru Chiefdom belongs to the genus Oryza and Ozyresatira species. Its various types include IR5, L9, and IRON 282. It is primarily an income generator rather than a food source at the CEP Kabwe, Kaliri, and at the Community Development Center (Cenre Developpement Communautaire; CDC) base in Kiringye.

Beans are grown predominantly in the central part of Lemera, covering areas from Rubanga to Mulenge. They are marketed in Bukavu and Uvira, with a large portion exported to nearby countries like Burundi and Rwanda. While beans, alongside rice, are exported, they usually fetch lower prices due to the local population's modest consumption of these foods as dietary staples. Traditionally, a bean dish is served with cassava mbundu. Corn is heavily cultivated in the Ruzizi Plain, especially in the Itara-Luvungi groupement, and the Hauts Plateaux, where it serves as the main dietary staple. Most Bafuliru in the Hauts Plateaux consume corn, though not all prefer it.

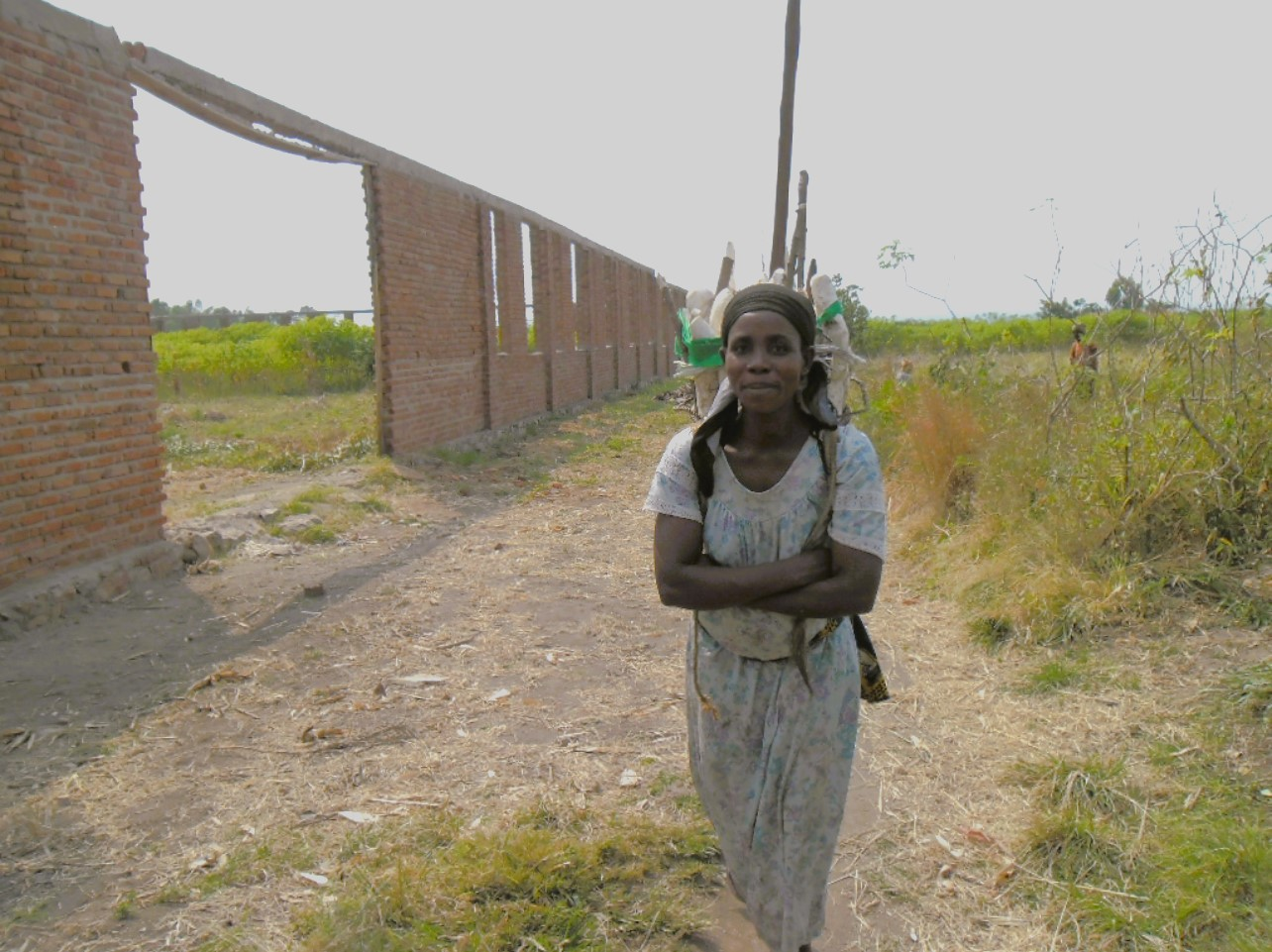
A Fuliiru mother carrying a load on her back

==== Peanut and coffee ====
Peanuts are mainly grown in Luvungi and Lubarika, though they are also present in Lemera and Rubanga. Peanuts are a local treat and are also exported to nearby countries like Rwanda and Burundi. Some are sold in Bukavu. Two types of coffee are grown in the Bafuliru Chiefdom: Coffea arabica and Coffea canephora. Among them, arabica is the most widespread. Exporting coffee to Burundi is a common practice.

=== Livestock and social structure ===
The Fuliru are also known for their cattle-based economy, which distinguishes them from many other Bantu highland groups. Livestock rearing, including cows, goats, and sheep, is practiced especially by wealthier households and serves multiple roles: providing milk, meat, prestige, and fulfilling social obligations such as bride price or ceremonial offerings. Veterinary practices and animal husbandry techniques are employed as part of climate adaptation strategies. Livelihood strategies are heavily influenced by household wealth, with asset ownership (e.g., land size, livestock, solar panels, radios, and mobile phones) determining whether a household is classified as poor, average, or wealthy. Poorer families typically cultivate plots smaller than 0.5 hectares and possess few assets, while wealthier households may own over 1 hectare of land and multiple forms of property.

Additionally, hunting and fishing are practiced using traditional methods. Fuliru hunters employ spears, machetes, dogs, and traps, while fishing is done with nets, hooks, water diversion techniques, and the use of plant-based poisons.

=== Music ===
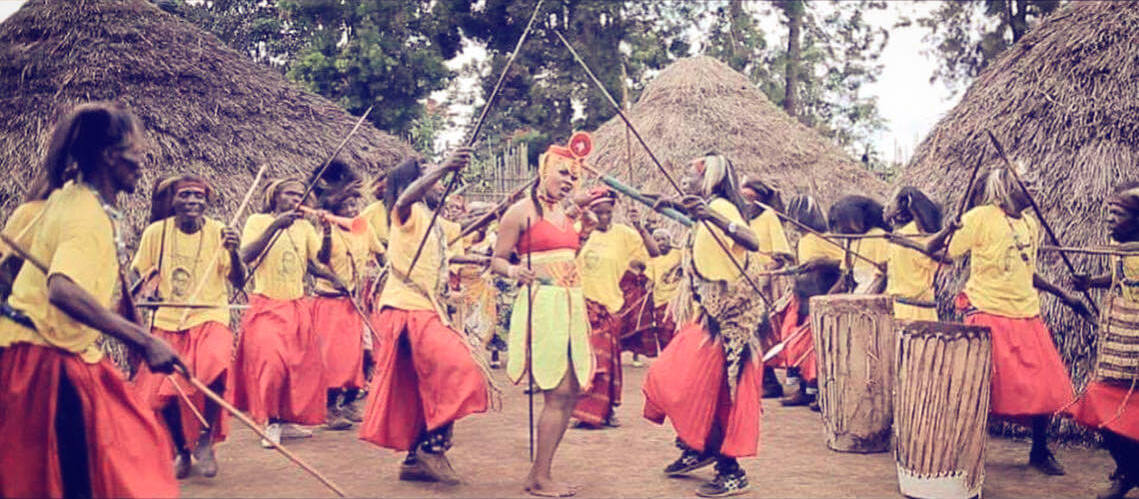
Fuliru traditional dance in Sange, 2004

Bafuliru music uses traditional instruments such as the ngoma (drum), xylophone, and flute to create varied rhythms and melodies, often accompanied by traditional dances. Ngoma is often played at social and religious events. Singing follows a call-and-response pattern, with one group singing a line and another answering in harmony. Bafuliru songs also honor leaders and ancestors and are often sung at political rallies and other community events.

In his study of Fuliru wedding songs, Fikiri Mubengwa explains that these songs entertain while passing on cultural knowledge. They teach young couples and the wider community to be polite, show respect, and care for their surroundings. Before the introduction of literacy in the 20th century, the songs were memorized and passed from one generation to the next through oral performances.

=== Religion ===
Before the advent of Christianity, Bafuliru adhered to a traditional belief system centered around the worship of a supreme deity known as Rurema, Nakalema or Nakalemeka, whom they regarded as the creator of all things in both the terrestrial and celestial realms. Rurema was perceived as an invisible and transcendent force beyond human reach. Intermediaries played a crucial role in connecting the people to this deity. Among the most significant spiritual leaders representing Rurema were Mushabo, Budisi, and Mugajalugulu, to whom the Bafuliru turned in matters that seemed beyond their control.

Catholicism made its initial inroads into Bafuliru Chiefdom with the construction of the first chapel in Luvungi in 1933, overseen by the parish of Nyangezi in the neighboring Walungu Territory. However, the growth of the Catholic Church in the region took a notable turn in 1974, when the influence of the Banyamulenge community shaped its direction. This influence saw the diaconate of Bibangwa becoming a focal point for anti-Fuliru activities orchestrated by the Banyamulenge. It contributed to the arming of Tutsi groups in the Hauts Plateaux. As a result, the Church was perceived by some as complicit in fostering divisions and hatred between the Bafuliru and the populations of the Hauts Plateaux.

The Bafuliru were introduced to Protestantism through Swedish missionaries David and Svea Flood, who arrived in the Itara-Luvungi groupement in 1921. Their mission encountered resistance from mwami Nyamugira Mukogabwe II, who was initially hesitant about foreign religious influences that could threaten traditional beliefs. Despite these challenges, the Floods managed to convert a local boy, a milestone that would eventually lead to the broader acceptance of Christianity within the Bafuliru community. The chief himself later embraced the faith, and through the work of the Floods and their successors, Protestantism gained a strong foothold in the region. By the mid-1920s, following a formal agreement between Uvira's territorial authorities and Protestant missionaries, Protestant churches began to proliferate, with congregations established in key locations such as Lemera, Ndolera, Luvungi, and Kigoma groupement.

=== Clothing, architecture, metallurgical traditions, and crafts ===
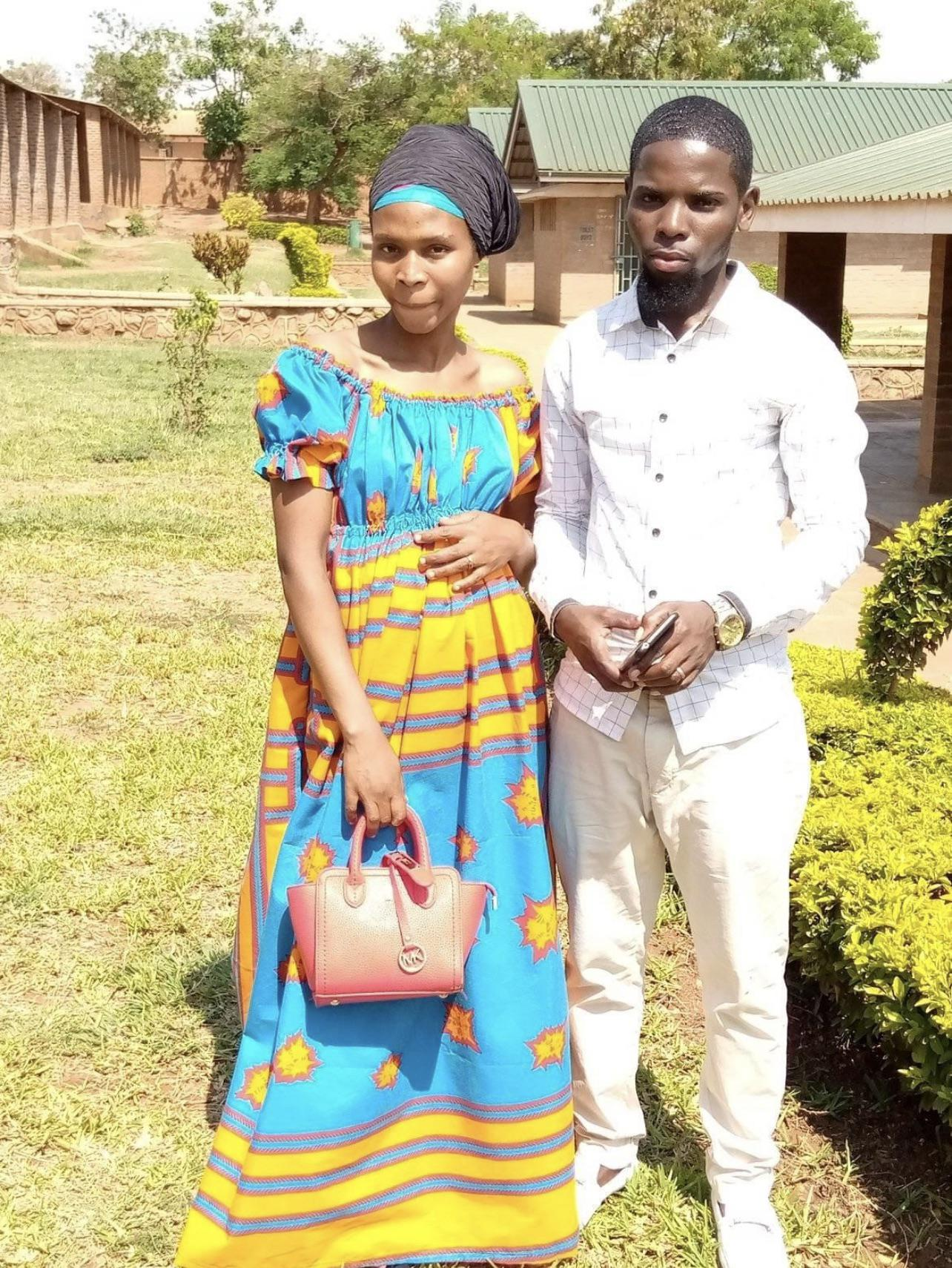
Fuliru couples in Uvira

In the past, Fuliru wore skirts of cloth made from tree bark, and cloaks made of animal hides. These have long been replaced by Western-style clothing. However, handmade beaded necklaces and bracelets are still worn. The woven fabrics, adorned with intricate patterns of vivid hues have honed their craft over generations.

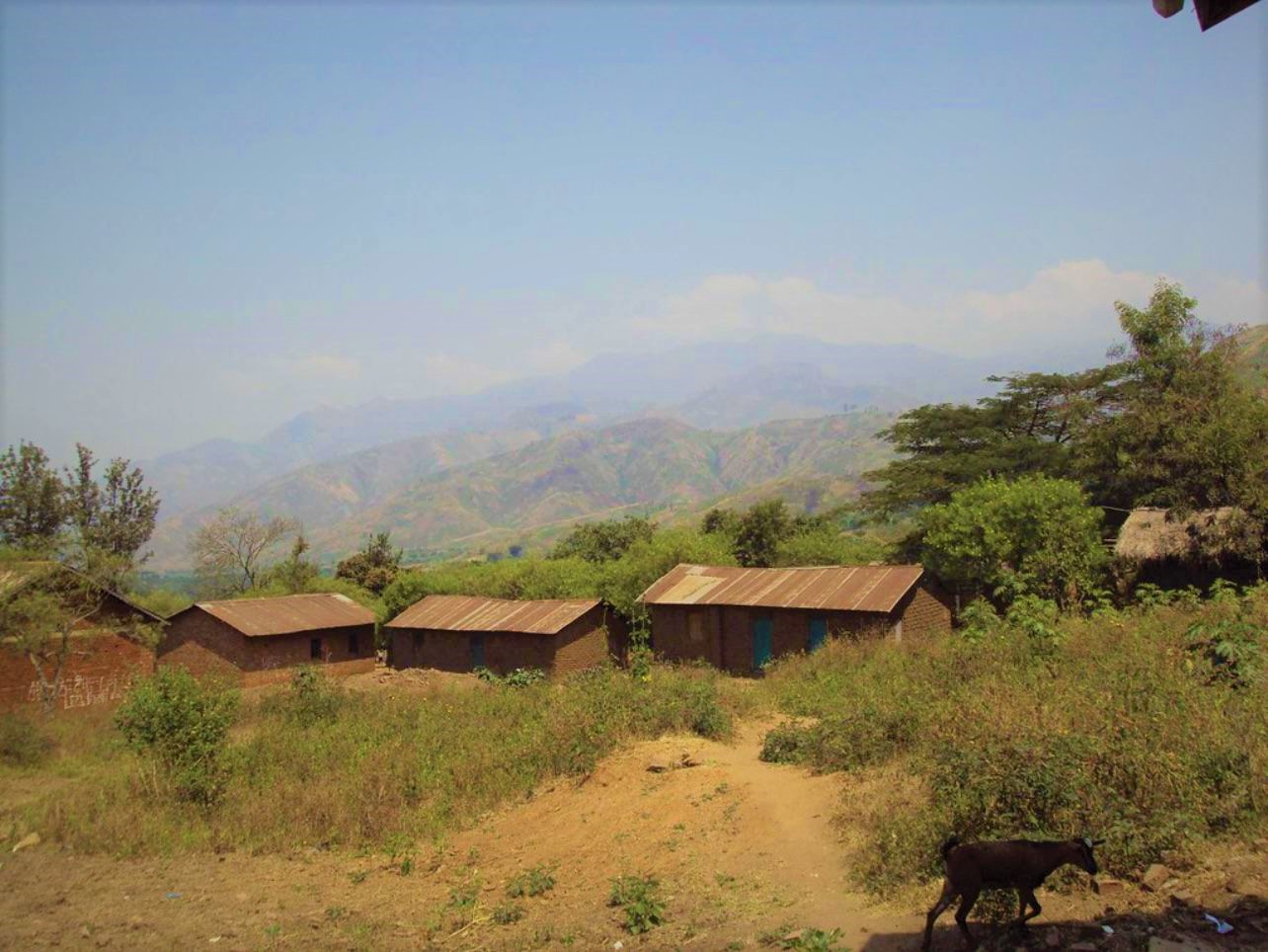
Small brick homes with metal roofs in Lubarika village in the Bafuliiru Chiefdom

Traditional Fuliru dwellings are circular, beehive-shaped huts constructed from wood, reeds, and straw, often enclosed by tall hedges. Homes include a central living area (Bululi) and sleeping quarters (Kisika). Ethnographic accounts from Frédéric Hautmann describe Fuliru settlements as closely integrated with their environment, using local materials like clay, banana fibers, and stones in domestic construction and ritual practices. Spiritual customs such as placing stones at high-altitude passes while calling for spiritual assistance ("Kilima mbua, aide-moi") reflect the sacred dimensions of the landscape.

The Fuliru are also skilled artisans and blacksmiths. They traditionally extracted iron from stone (known locally as matare) to manufacture tools such as hoes, machetes, spears, razors, and knives. Historian Jacques Depelchin remarked that the Fuliru gained a reputation for their ironworking prowess, supported by the abundant iron ore found in the Mitumba Mountains, which was essential to their technological and economic growth. Agricultural surplus, particularly cultivated by women, played a crucial role in transforming wealth, with women's sale of farm products often redirected by their husbands into the purchase of cattle, a process facilitated by barter using intermediate goods like hoes, salt, copper bracelets, cloth, and beads. Hoes, especially before the mid-19th century, served as the most common and valuable currency in cattle transactions, with exchange rates ranging from ten to twenty hoes per cow depending on the animal's reproductive potential. Unlike other regions where ironworking was monopolized by specific clans, Uvira Territory allowed widespread access to the craft, enabling a broad distribution of metallurgical skills, though collective labor remained important in mining, charcoal preparation, and furnace operation. Despite the abundance of iron ore, cattle gradually replaced hoes as the dominant form of wealth, as they symbolized social prestige, reproductive value, and exchange potential, though hoes continued to be used for specific exchanges, such as dowries and bridewealth payments. Although women did not directly partake in blacksmithing, they were instrumental in collecting materials for smelting and managing agricultural surpluses, which enabled the conversion of iron goods into wealth.

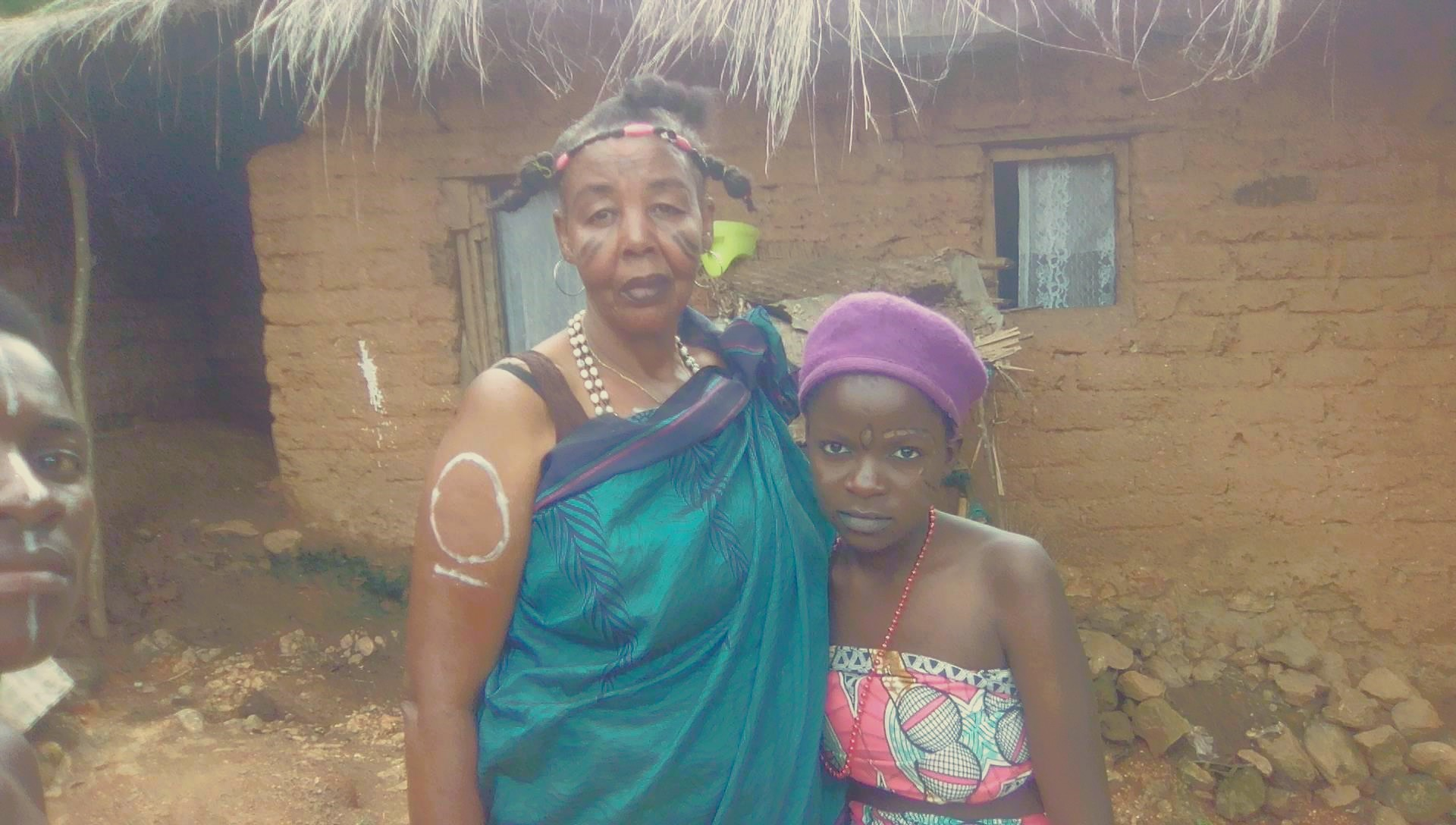
Fuliru grandmother and her granddaughter in Lemera

Hoes thus embodied a dual role as instruments of production and units of currency, their value stemming from their ability to reproduce agricultural surplus, which could then be reinvested into the acquisition of more hoes, cattle, or wives, resembling early capitalist dynamics. In the late 19th and early 20th centuries, prominent Fuliru chiefs, such as Katembo, specialized in long-distance trading networks, exchanging hoes and cattle across the Ruzizi Plain into Burundi and Rwanda, while avoiding the risks of the ivory and rubber markets dominated by foreign powers. These trading expeditions, organized collectively with groups of twenty to thirty people, relied on personal contacts rather than centralized marketplaces to find buyers, and success was determined by both material wealth and the ability to cultivate social relationships. Political authority among Fuliru chiefs, like mwami Nyamugira Mukogabwe II, was linked to wealth and management of social networks, alliances, and resources like cattle, hoes, and iron, with wealth accumulation, redistribution, and political legitimacy shaping the socio-political structure of Fuliru society.

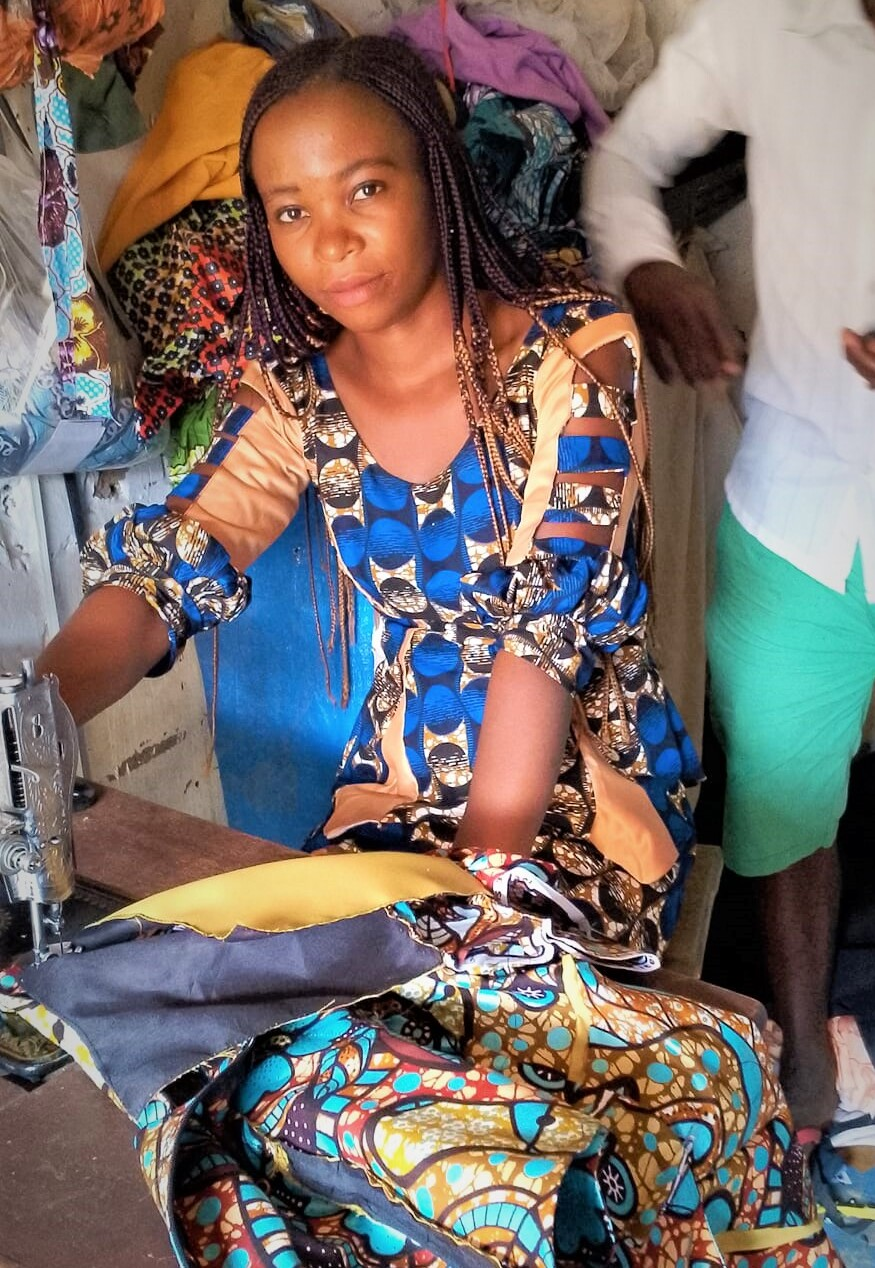
Fuliiru tailor named Dorcas in Uvira

In addition to metalwork, woodworking is also a prominent craft that yields items such as canoes, plates, mortars, and pestles, while pottery turns clay into utensils such as jugs and storage containers. A notable cultural practice involves burying the placenta in a shallow grave near home, sealed in a ritual clay pot with holes that, according to local belief, allow the "spirit of the placenta" to remain connected to the outside world. Frédéric Hautmann, an Austrian physician, dentist, and amateur archaeologist, observed in his travels that, "Near Mulenghe (Mulenge), a two-day walk from Sanghe (Sange), I was able to witness five of these small 'tumuli.' While traversing additional villages inhabited by the Bafulero [Bafuliiru] of the mountains, I encountered another ten such structures, containing pots with two holes, either intact, broken, or reduced to fragmentary remains". This custom serves to safeguard the newborn from malevolent mountain spirits. Approximately two months following the birth, a gathering occurs at the burial site of the placenta, during which parents, family members, and friends partake in a celebratory festival that lasts several days and nights. The tumulus is adorned with Kasigisi as part of the festivities.

=== Funeral rites and social succession ===
When a Fuliru person died, mourning lasted for five days. If the deceased had given birth to twins, the mourning lasted six days. During the mourning ceremony, the family members of the deceased are shaved. The eldest son is enthroned in the place of the deceased by being handed a spear, a symbol of power that signified that all other family members owed him allegiance. At the same time, the younger brother of the deceased is also enthroned as the guardian of the mwami by being given a machete, symbolizing that he would work for the newly enthroned son. If the deceased had only daughters, no enthronement took place. Instead, a guardian is appointed to watch over the deceased's family.

During this mourning period, no family member is allowed to bathe, and if married, they had to stay away from their spouse, as it is considered a taboo.

=== Oral tradition ===
==== Storytelling and proverbs ====
Depelchin described ifumo as a form of Fuliiru storytelling similar to the Vira's shumu. He translated the verbs ku-fumo in Kifuliiru and ku-shuma in Kivira as "to knit or to collect a story". Storytellers repeatedly reworked stories, creating different versions of the same themes. For Depelchin, these differences mattered because they could reflect a storyteller's background and way of seeing things. The ability to hold an audience's attention was more highly valued than factual accuracy, even when a fumo drew on real events. Depending on the performer and audience, the middle could grow through extra episodes and details without changing the beginning or ending. One informant said a story could last an entire day without a break. This freedom allowed storytellers to expand familiar stories while keeping their basic structure.

These tales often brought human and animal characters together. Depelchin saw this as reflecting a world in which humans and animals were more closely connected. Using animals also allowed storytellers to disguise possible links between story characters and people in the community. The tales entertained while teaching the values on which society depended. Another form, u-mugani (plural migani), was sometimes hard to distinguish from fumo, though its stories were usually shorter. Depelchin suggested that the term may first have referred only to proverbs. In his examples, a proverb often opened or closed a short story that explained its meaning, linking advice or wisdom to a story. He considered longer fumo performances more demanding of storytelling skill than migani.

==== Riddles, clan origins and political authority ====
Known as bisakuzo, riddles required an understanding of language, history, social life, and customs. They often used older words that had disappeared in daily speech, so understanding older words was important. While young performers could become skilled at telling fumo and migani, mastering riddles required wider knowledge that younger generations found harder to gain. Riddle exchanges followed a verbal challenge and response. The person presenting a riddle called "Sakwe", and someone accepting the challenge answered "Ruuze". Depelchin described ku-sakuza as taking part in a riddle duel. He also noted that women were considered especially skilled at solving riddles.

Depelchin found that origin accounts belonged to Fuliiru oral tradition but drew less attention from his informants than folktales and other literary forms. Their wording and style were not fixed, and accounts of ruling clans often contained differences or contradictions. In one story about the Balambo clan, Nandola came from a hill in Bukunzi and crossed the Ruzizi River with his followers and cattle. His route took him through Nyangezi to Kaziba, where he met mwami Ngweshe, before settling as a chief at Luhwindja. The account described efforts by Ngweshe, Kaziba, and Muganga to defeat him, after which Nyabuvuma and Mulambo left for Lwindi. Depelchin treated this as a clan origin story rather than a confirmed historical account.

These traditions often centered on migration, conflict, and material needs. Closer questioning connected disputes to shortages of land, famine, or attempts to place another chief under one's rule. Lwindi was often named as the earliest place of origin, although each clan or family also claimed its own ancestry. Depelchin suggested that the Balambo account's Rwandan origin might not be literal. He read its connection between Rwanda and cattle as evidence of cattle becoming part of Fuliiru social life, but the account gave no clear date for that change.

Stories about origins also helped justify chiefly authority. Depelchin noted that Fuliiru and Vira accounts often described someone becoming mwami after supplying food or killing a dangerous animal. He interpreted these acts as representing wider changes in where people settled, how they obtained resources, how work was divided, and how social ranks developed. Such stories could also make the power of paramount chiefs seem ancient even where its fuller development had been encouraged under colonial rule.

== Notable people ==
- Jean Ruhigita Ndagora Bugwika — evangelist, superintendent, educator, and pastor
- Justin Bitakwira — politician and member of the National Assembly
- Louis Bidalira — rebel leader
- Guillain Maliyamungu Nabahya — founder of the Nabahya Food Institute (NFI)
- Martin Bitijula Mahimba — politician
- Rebu Burubwa — founder of the Rutasoka Clinic
