= Furiiru =

Furiiru may refer to:

- Furiiru people
- Furiiru language
- Bafuliiru Chiefdom
