= Nabahya Food Institute =

Agriculture institution in Uvira, South Kivu

- Formation: 20 February 2020; 5 years ago
- Type: NGO
- Legal status: Company
- Purpose: To empower rural communities in the Democratic Republic of the Congo by promoting sustainable agriculture and enhancing food security.
- Headquarters: Uvira, South Kivu
- Chairperson: Guillain Maliyamungu Nabahya (Since 2020)
- Website: nabahyafoodinstitute.org

The Nabahya Food Institute (NFI) is a non-profit organization based in Uvira, located strategically in the eastern region of the Democratic Republic of the Congo. Its primary mission is to enhance food security, address environmental challenges, and alleviate poverty through sustainable agricultural practices and renewable energy solutions. As a food research, production, and processing institute, NFI focuses on breaking the cycle of poverty by producing healthy food and providing training to rural farmers in climate-resilient food systems and permaculture techniques.

== History ==
NFI was established on 20 February 2020 by Congolese researcher Guillain Maliyamungu Nabahya, an expert in renewable clean energy and sustainable food systems, to develop robust, sustainable communities that produce nutritious food while combating deforestation, soil biodiversity decline, and detrimental climate change that has led to extreme famine in the eastern region of the Democratic Republic of the Congo.

== Mission ==
Nabahya Food Institute's mission is to advance sustainable agriculture and permaculture practices in the Democratic Republic of the Congo through the use of renewable energy technologies and permaculture design techniques. NFI educates farmers on the principles of ecological symbiosis, emphasizing the importance of reusing and recycling natural resources—such as sunlight, air, soil, water, plants, and animals—rather than relying on chemical-laden imports.

NFI boosts crop growth and yields by supplying affordable, disease-free seeds and advising on ideal sowing seasons and local weather conditions. The institute promotes eco-friendly farming methods, including composting, manure production, biochar application, and integrated pest control.

NFI also innovates irrigation techniques to enhance water efficiency and minimize environmental impacts. The institute sustainably preserves food at the village level by encouraging food processing innovations such as solar cooking and drying. Additionally, NFI supports small business ventures related to agriculture, processing, and transportation.
