= Fuliiru language =

Bantu language spoken in the Congo

Fuliiru
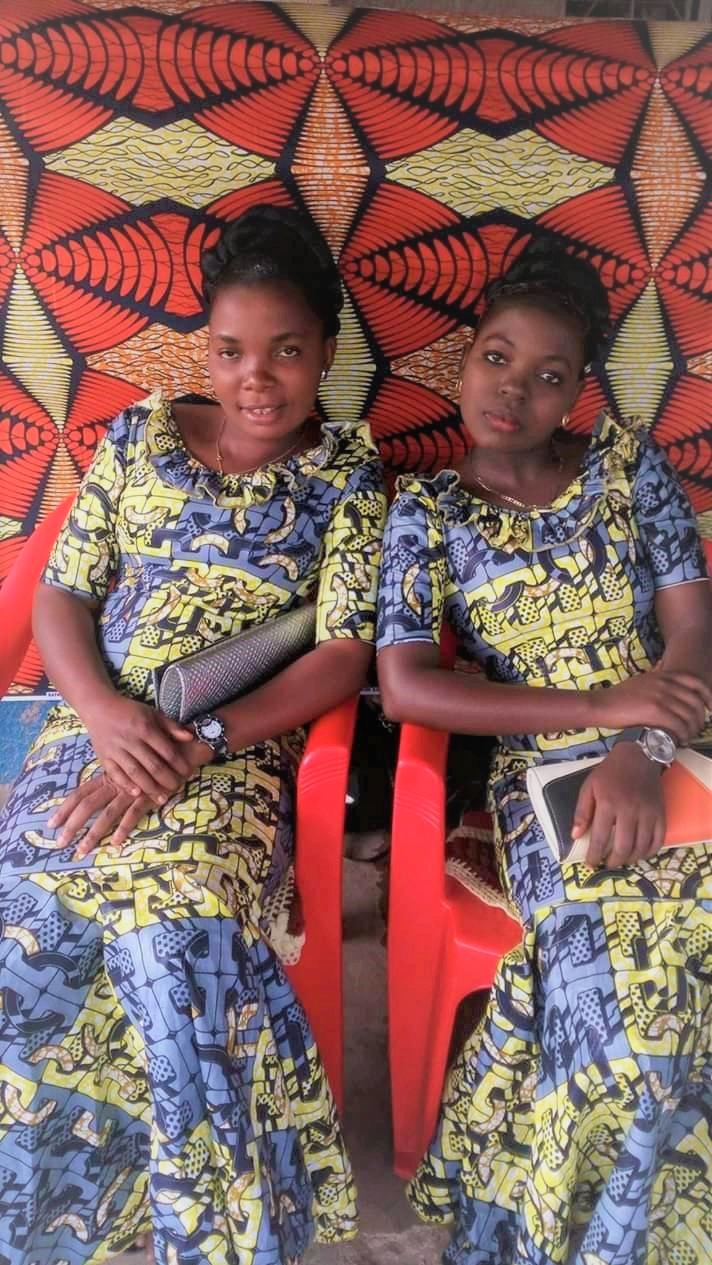
- Fuliiru women in Uvira
- Native to: Uganda and Democratic Republic of the Congo
- Ethnicity: Fuliiru
- Native speakers: 400,000 (2012)
- Language family: Niger–Congo?: Atlantic–Congo; Volta-Congo; Benue–Congo; Bantoid; Southern Bantoid; Bantu; Northeast Bantu; Great Lakes Bantu; Shi-Havu; Fuliiru

Language codes
- ISO 639-3: Either: flr – Fuliiru job – Joba (Vira)
- Glottolog: fuli1240 Fuliiru joba1238 Joba
- Guthrie code: JD.63,631

The Fuliiru language (autonym: Kifuliiru; also spelled Fuliru) is a Great Lakes Bantu language spoken by the Fuliru people in the eastern Democratic Republic of the Congo, particularly in areas north and west of Uvira Territory in the South Kivu province. It belongs to the Niger–Congo language family, within the Bantu branch, and is classified among the Shi–Havu subgroup of the Great Lakes Bantu languages. Closely related to Kinyindu, Fuliiru is the primary means of communication for Bafuliiru, with an estimated 400,000 native speakers as of 2012.

It is characterized by its tonal system, agglutinative morphology, and extensive noun class structure. During colonial and postcolonial times, it was often marginalized in favor of Swahili and French.

== Phonology ==
=== Consonants ===
The table below gives the consonant set of Fuliiru.

		Labial	Alveolar	Post- alveolar	Palatal	Velar	Laryngeal
Plosive	voiceless	p	t			k	
Plosive	voiced		d			g	
Plosive	prenasalized	ᵐb	ⁿd			ᵑɡ	
Fricative	voiceless	f	s	ʃ			h
Fricative	voiced	v	z	ʒ			
Nasal		m	n		ɲ		
Liquid			l/ɾ				
Approximant		β			j	(w) (Note: This sound is very rare in Fuliiru, and only occurs after other consonants or as the result of a /u/ becoming a glide.)	

Several sounds change when preceded by a nasal: voiceless sounds become voiced, and /β/ and /h/ are realized as [b].

The phoneme /n/ assimilates to the place of consonants that follow it: it can be realized as [m], [ɱ], [n], [ɲ], or [ŋ].

The phoneme /l/ is realized as [d] after /n/, as [ɾ] after the front vowels /e/ and /i/, and as [l] elsewhere. The phoneme /ɾ/ is likewise realized as [d] after /n/, but as [ɾ] elsewhere.

=== Vowels ===
The table below gives the vowel sounds of Fuliiru.

	Front	Back
High	i	u
Mid	e	o
Low	a	

All five vowels occur in long and short forms, a distinction that is phonemically distinctive. The quality of a vowel is not affected by its length.

=== Tone ===
Like most Bantu languages, Fuliiru is tonal, with a two-way contrast between high and low tones. Morphemes can be underlyingly high (H), low (L), or toneless. Phonetically, high, low, mid, and falling tones can all occur; mid tones are the realization of an underlying LH sequence, and falling tones are the realization of an underlying HL sequence or an utterance-final H tone.

== Morphosyntax ==
Fuliiru grammar is agglutinating and, typical of Bantu languages, heavily prefixed. Historically, Fuliiru was not written and the language was suppressed in favor of Swahili and French; in addition, Fuliiru has been subjected to significant influence by neighboring languages, to the point that many native speakers use a large number of loanwords or even French word order. In spite of this, it enjoys a high degree of internal cohesiveness throughout the area in which it is spoken. The following treatment, after Van Otterloo (2011), represents the form of the language as it existed prior to such extensive outside influence.

The basic word order of Fuliiru is SVO, although there are a number of exceptions to this rule based on the rhetorical context of a given statement.

=== Nouns ===
Fuliiru boasts 17 noun classes, with an additional unmarked class, dubbed 1a, that behaves as a subcategory of Class 1. Class is expressed by the addition of a prefix to the noun stem which further governs agreement within the broader noun phrase. Grammatical number is an intrinsic feature of class prefixing, with some noun classes inherently singular or inherently plural, and other classes lacking number entirely. There are numerous homophonous noun stems in Fuliiru, making it possible to express multiple divergent meanings by applying different class prefixes to an identical noun stem, as in:

búgángà
bú-gángà
C14-gángà
“malaria”

mágángà
má-gángà
C6-gángà
“cow urine”

Generally, words of a similar semantic type are grouped together into noun classes, although there are numerous exceptions to this. The following is a list of all 17 Fuliiru noun classes utilizing the class numbering system traditionally used in Bantu linguistics.

Singular / non-count classes		Plural classes		Typical meaning(s)
Number	Prefix	Number	Prefix	Typical meaning(s)
1	mú-			Humans
1a	[X]	2	bá-	Humans, names, kinship terms
3	mú-	4	mí-	Plants, round items, long items
5	(l)í-			Body parts
6	má-			Liquid masses
7	kí-	8	bí-	Body parts, trees
9	n-	10	n-	Man-made items, large animals, sensations
11	lú-			Places
12	ká-	13	tú-	Small animals, birds, other body parts
14	bú-			Abstract nouns
15	kú-			Verbal infinitives
16	há-			Locatives
19	hí-			Diminutives

=== Pronouns ===
The Fuliiru pronoun system is very richly developed. As is the case with many other Bantu languages, each noun class has an associated pronoun set. Free-standing personal pronouns are highly marked to show their specific function within the broader text; in all, Fuliiru pronouns function differently than those of other languages and correct pronoun usage serves an important rhetorical purpose. Other parts of speech similarly contain bound pronominal morphemes that show full agreement.

There are five different types of personal pronouns, with each type further subdivided into individual forms representing and showing agreement with each noun class. As each pronoun type corresponds to every noun class, there are dozens of personal pronouns in Fuliiru.

Contrastive pronouns serve to clarify references in rhetorical situations in which the specific referent is ambiguous or unclear.

Ùyó múnyérè ànáshùbì mwágúlá ífwárángà {} hálìkó ùyó mútàbínà yêhé àtànázìtwázà.
ùyó mú-nyérè à-ná-shùbì mwágúl-á í=fwárángà || hálìkó ùyó mú-tàbánà y-ê-hé à-tà-ná-zì-twáz-à
that.N+C1 C1-girl C1-SQ-AGAIN throw.down-FA AU=C10+money {} but that.N+C1 C1-young.man C1-CTR.P C1-NEG-SQ-O10-care-FA
“And that girl again threw down the money, but that young man, he did not pay attention to it.”

Alternative pronouns indicate that the referent is different than one that the listener would have incorrectly assumed; these forms are often used at crucial turning points of stories and exemplify the extreme importance of pronoun usage in Fuliiru discourse.

Múgùmà ànábwîrà úwábò {} kwóyêhé ndááyé úwábò múndú úwàngàmútébà {} náyé úwábò {} ànámúbwîrà kwóyékì {} àngàmútébà.
mú-gùmà à-ná-bwîr-à ú=w-ábò | kwó=y-ê-hé ndáá-yé ú=w-ábò mú-ndú ú-w-àngà-mú-téb-à || ná-yé ú=w-ábò | à-ná-mú-bwîr-à kwó=y-ékì | à-ngà-mú-téb-à
C1-one C1-SQ-tell-FA AU=C1-SAME.SET {} CMP=C1-CTR.P NEG.FOC-C1 AU=C1-SAME.SET C1-person S.R-C1-POS-O1-trick-FA {} ADD.P-C1 AU=C1-SAME.SET {} C1-SQ-O1-tell-FA CMP=C1-ALT.P {} C1-POT-O1-trick-FA
“A certain person told his fellow that nobody would be able to trick. And [the fellow] told him that he [the unexpected alternative] would be the one to trick him.”

Exclusive pronouns represent the "self" of the referent as opposed to others; thus, they indicate that the referent is alone, or is being referred to in opposition to any other referent.

Sì úmúhyà {} ànásìgálè hí bándá yêngwâ.
sì= ú=mú-hyà || à-ná-sìgál-è hí= bándá y-êngwâ
but AU=C1-bride {} C1-CON-remain-FE C16+C5 shelter C1-self
“But that bride remained behind in the shelter by herself.”

Another set of exclusive pronouns, borrowed from the neighboring Kiviira language, has the same meaning as above but is more typical of colloquial speech.

Mwámì {} tì niêhê {} ngámúyìyìtìrà {} niêngwâ.
mwámì || tì= ni-êhê | n-gá-mú-yì-yìt-ìr-à | ni-êngwâ
C1-king {} QUOT 1SG-CTR.P {} 1SG-F2-O1-RFX-kill-APL-FA {} 1SG-self
“The king said, 'I will just kill him myself.'”

Additive pronouns indicate that the referent is involved in the same set of actions as a different, previously mentioned referent.

Ànálámùsà yàbó bágénì {} ìrí ànáhúnúzà îtwê. {} Yàbó bágùndà {} íkyânyà bákábàlámúsâ {} nábó bànàgírá {} kwôkwò.
à-ná-lámùs-à yàbó bá-génì | ìrí à-ná-hún-ìz-à î-twê || yàbó bá-gùndà || í=ky-ânyà bá-ká-bà-lámús-â || ná-b-ó bà-nà-gír-á | kwô-kw-ò
C1-SQ-greet-FA those.N+C2 C2-guests {} while C1-SQ-bow-CS-FA C5-head {} those.N+C2 C2-peasants {} AU=C7-time C2-P2-O2-greet-FA {} ADD.P-C2 C2-SQ-do-FA {} EMPH-C15-thus
“And [the wedding host] greeted those guests while bowing his head. Those common folk, when they greeted [the guests], they also did the same thing.”

The breadth of pronominal forms in Fuliiru far exceeds the scope of this article.

=== Adjectives ===
Fuliiru has a small number of adjective stems; Van Otterloo (2011) identifies only 39 in total. Adjectives follow nouns. Most of these stems communicate very general concepts which are in turn semantically fleshed out by the addition of a noun class prefix that strongly agrees with the referent, as in:

múndú múbì
mú-ndú mú-bì
C1-person C1-bad
“bad person”

bándú bábì
bá-ndú bá-bì
C2-person C2-bad
“bad people”

The comparative form of an adjective is constructed using the locative prefix ku, as in the example below. Roughly, this construction expresses "greatness in relation to" the referent marked with ku.

Úmwìgéndérézì {} yémúkùlù kúndwánì.
ú=mw-ìgéndérézì || y-é=mú-kùlù kú=n-dwánì
AU=C1-patient.one {} C1-FOC=C1-great LOC=C9-fighter
“The patient one is the one who is greater than the fighter.”

The comparative can also be constructed using the verb -him- (“to surpass”), as in:

Íkíshókómà {} kyókìrì némísí {} úkúhímà ìyó shúúlì.
í=kí=shókómà || ky-ó=kì-rì né=mí-sí || ú+kú-hím-à ìyó shúúlì
AU=C7-leopard {} C7-FOC=C7-have CNJ+AU=C4-strength {} AU=C15-surpass-FA that.N+C9 C9+bull
“The leopard is the one which has strength surpassing the bull.”

=== Verbs ===
Verbs are constructed by the addition to the verb stem of various prefixes which express categories of tense, aspect, mood, person, negation and so forth. Verbs are inflected according to the following paradigm:

[subject-relative] + [subject] + [negation] + [TAM] + [additive] + [persistive] + [STEM]

The Subject Relative marker indicates a relative clause in which the subject of the clause is referenced to the noun phrase being modified, as in:

yàbó bátàbánà ábákázíndì yíjà
yàbó bá-tàbánà á-bá-ká-zíndì yíj-à
those.N+C2 C2-young.men S.R-C2-P2-LASTLY come-FA
“those young men who came last”

In this passage, the relative clause "who came last" refers to "those young men" and therefore takes the Subject Relative marker, shown in bold. The marker takes the form of an initial high-tone vowel identical to the vowel of the following subject prefix; thus, it is always á, í or ú.

The Subject marker, displayed in the chart below, shows agreement with the noun class of the verb's subject. Note that in this category, in addition to the standard noun classes, there are also prefixes corresponding to first/second person singular and plural subjects.

Subject Prefixes
1S	2S	1	1PL	2PL	2	3	4	5	6	7	8	9	10	11	12	13	14	15	16	19
n-	u-	a-	tu-	mu-	ba-	gu-	i-	li-	ga-	ki-	bi-	i-	zi-	lu-	ka-	tu-	bu-	ku-	ha-	hi-

The Negation marker ta- negates the entire construction.

The TAM marker can be any of several possible prefixes that express tense, aspect, mood or some combination of them. Fuliiru features complex multi-word auxiliary constructions for many TAM forms, including copulas and many progressive expressions. Some of these constructions may have subtle narrative or imperfective connotations. The following is a small selection of TAM prefixes:

Prefix	TAM meaning
-à	Simple Past (P1)
-ká	Unmarked Past (P2)
-áàli	Remote Past (P3)
-àmú	Immediate Future (F1)
-gáá	Unmarked Future (F2)
-ááyè	Remote Future (F3)
[null]	Timeless / Habitual

The Additive prefix ná- expresses that the action of the verb occurs alongside or in addition to something else.

Nângà, {} ndágánákìshèènyà.
nângà | n-dá-gá-ná-kì-shèèny-à
no {} 1SG-NEG-F2-ADD.V-PERS-cut.firewood-FA
“No, and in addition I will no longer cut firewood.”

Similarly, the Persistive prefix kì- indicates that the verb's action continues or persists; with the negative, it means that the action has ceased.

Bàtànákìményà {} háyì hóbàlì múgéndà.
bà-tà-ná-kì-mény-à || háyì h-ó=bà-lì mú=génd-à
C2-NEG-ADD.V-PERS-know-FA {} where C16-O.R=C2-is PROG=go-FA
“And they no longer knew where they were going.”

Stems themselves are often complex structures consisting of object and reflexive prefixes which are in turn attached to a verb root to create what Van Otterloo (2011) terms a "macrostem." Stems are constructed as:

[object] + [reflexive] + [ROOT] + [TAM ending]

The Object prefix comes at the beginning of the stem and agrees with the noun class of the verb's direct object. Note that in this category, in addition to the standard noun classes, there are also prefixes corresponding to first/second person singular and plural objects.

Object Prefixes
1S	2S	1	1PL	2PL	2	3	4	5	6	7	8	9	10	11	12	13	14	15	16	19
n-	kú-	mú-	tù-	mù-	bà-	gù-	gì-	lì-	gà-	kì-	bì-	gì-	zì-	lù-	kà-	tù-	bù-	kù-	hà-	hì-

The Reflexive marker yì- comes immediately before the verbal root. This marker is unusual because it is CV-shaped instead of V-shaped like in most other Bantu languages.>

Àtànákìshóbòlà {} úkúmúyìlyósákwò.
à-tà-ná-kì-shóbòl-à || ú=kú-mú-yì-lyó-s-á=kwò
C1-NEG-SQ-PERS-be.able-FA {} AU=C15=O1-RFX-leave-CS-FA=+C17
“And he was no longer able to remove himself from [another person].”

Lastly, the Final Vowel ending is placed at the end of the root and depends upon the TAM prefix occurring earlier in the verb construction. The specific tense, aspect or mood expressed by the TAM prefix varies depending on this final vowel, so that identical TAM prefixes can have divergent meanings when paired with different final vowels.

Of note, the verb root itself can also be composed of a number of extensions and suffixes, some of them multi-word constructions, making Fuliiru verbs highly complex.

Fuliiru infinitives are essentially nominalized verb forms constructed according to the following paradigm:

[augment] + [class 15] + [negative] + [object] + [reflexive] + STEM + [final vowel]

Infinitive forms contain the augment ú- and the noun class 15 prefix kú-, and may also be negated by ta-. The final vowel is -a, with the tone changing according to the lexical tone of the verb stem.

úkútàsìmbáhà
ú=kú-tà-sìmbáh-à
AU=C15-NEG-obey-FA
“to not obey”

== Discourse ==
Modes of discourse are extremely important in Fuliiru, much more so than in European languages.

Fuliiru has a rich vocabulary of ideophones – idioms, onomatopoeia and quotatives – that shape narrative and discursive speech acts. Fuliiru has a far wider range of these words and expressions than even other Bantu languages where these modes are especially emphasized. The following is a small selection of this specialized vocabulary:

Word	Category	Meaning
tì	quotative	indicates a quoted line
ngágì-ngágì	onomatopoeia	two people fighting
tóò-tóò	onomatopoeia	sound of rain
shólyò-shólyò	onomatopoeia	a witch moving in the night
Hálììbwî!	interjection	"How stupid!"
Yóò!	interjection	"Oh my!"
ààhô	interjection	"okay then"

In addition to the numerous ideophones that characterize Fuliiru discourse, reduplication is a pervasive feature of the language. This linguistic phenomenon, which can occur in any part of speech, expresses various meanings like repetition, extensiveness, emphasis or pejorative.

It is ultimately this category of discursive language that "brings life" to Fuliiru.
