= Jacques Depelchin =

Congolese historian and militant

Jacques Depelchin (born 06/03/1942) is a Congolese historian and militant. He is the Co-Founder and Executive Director of the Ota Benga International Alliance for Peace in the DR Congo.

== Background ==
A native of the Congo, Depelchin was educated internationally, beginning in the Democratic Republic of the Congo with Lovanium University in Kinshasa before relocating to England to attend the University of London, to Italy to attend Johns Hopkins University and to the United States to attend Stanford University. After completing his education, he taught African History at a number of universities in the United States, in his home country, in Mozambique and Tanzania.

Depelchin worked as a secretariat for the Alliance of Democratic Forces for the Liberation of Congo, which helped bring Laurent-Désiré Kabila to power. From 1996-2002, he was a member of the Rally for Congolese Democracy, opposing Kabila, being identified in 2000 by The New York Times as among the group's leaders.

== Books ==
- Reclaiming African History
- From the Congo Free State to Zaire (1885-1974): Towards a Demystification of Economic and Political History, 1992
- Silences in African History, 2000
