= Bukunzi =

Former Kingdom in Rwanda

Coordinates: 02°29′0″S 28°53′48″E

Bukunzi, also known as Mbirizi, was a small kingdom located in the extreme southwest of what is now Rwanda. The kings of Bukunzi were renowned throughout the region for the legendary control of the rain. Located east of the Ruzizi River, Bukunzi was apparently founded by members of the Shi royal family, who fled into political exile following a family dispute. Luhwinja, another small polity, is thought to have emerged from Bukunzi. Located southeast of Lake Kivu, its historical ties were to the west with Bushi. Through the eighteenth and nineteenth century, it had close ties to Ngweshe, one of the most powerful of the Shi states. Bukunzi remained apart from the central Rwandan court until the military campaign led by colonial Belgium merged it into the central court in 1925, along with other small kingdoms located west of the Rwandan kingdom, such as Kingogo, Bushiru, and Busozo. The area of the former Bukunzi kingdom is now part of Rusizi District in Rwanda.
