= Rutasoka Clinic =

Geography
- Location: Uvira, South Kivu, Democratic Republic of the Congo

Organisation
- Care system: Prenatal care, postpartum care, pediatric care, general medical services, counseling and support services
- Type: Community

Services
- Emergency department: Yes

History
- Opened: 2017; 9 years ago

Links
- Website: https://rutasoka.com/

The Rutasoka Clinic (French: Clinique Rutasoka) is a women's clinic strategically situated in Uvira within the South Kivu province in the eastern region of the Democratic Republic of the Congo. The clinic specializes in providing expectant and postpartum mothers with a safe and healthy environment for childbirth, as well as medical care services. It was established in 2017 by Rebu Burubwa, a Congolese-born Swedish businessman who is also the founder of Rutasoka Coffee.

The Democratic Republic of the Congo is one of the most dangerous countries in the world for women, and sexual violence and vulnerability are widespread. Given these conditions, Rutasoka Clinic's mission is to provide women with optimal conditions for an excellent start to their motherhood and access to helpful healthcare to mitigate child and maternal mortality rates across the country.

== History ==
The establishment of the Rutasoka Clinic dates back to the early 2010s when Rebu Burubwa, a Congolese-born Swedish entrepreneur, embarked on building a medical center in Uvira within the South Kivu Province, which was suffering from poverty and persecution due to the ongoing Kivu conflicts in the region. In 2015, Burubwa initiated Rutasoka Coffee, an import enterprise based in Uvira, as a pivotal component of his strategy to fortify the clinic's infrastructure. With the necessary resources in place, construction of the clinic began in 2016, and it was officially opened in 2017. It became one of the region's self-sustaining institutions, providing care for expectant and new mothers and offering a safe place for children to be born.

== Facilities ==
The Rutasoka Clinic has 15 employees and 22 rooms. Since its inception, it has provided care to over 600 patients. In addition to providing healthcare services, the clinic also offers job opportunities to the local population.
