= List of international presidential trips made by Félix Tshisekedi =

Félix Tshisekedi has made numerous public international trips to several countries as the President of the Democratic Republic of the Congo since taking office on 25 January 2019.

== Summary ==
The number of visits per country where Félix Tshisekedi traveled include:

- One visit: Belgium, Cambodia, Gabon, Indonesia, Italy, Kazakhstan, Namibia, Rwanda, Saudi Arabia, South Africa, Tanzania, Togo, Turkey, and Zambia.
- Two visits: China, Germany, Hungary, Israel, Kenya, Russia, United Arab Emirates, and United Kingdom.
- Three visits: Egypt, Ethiopia, Qatar, Switzerland, and Uganda.
- Five visits: Angola, France, and Republic of the Congo.
- Ten visits: United States.

== 2010s ==
=== 2019 ===
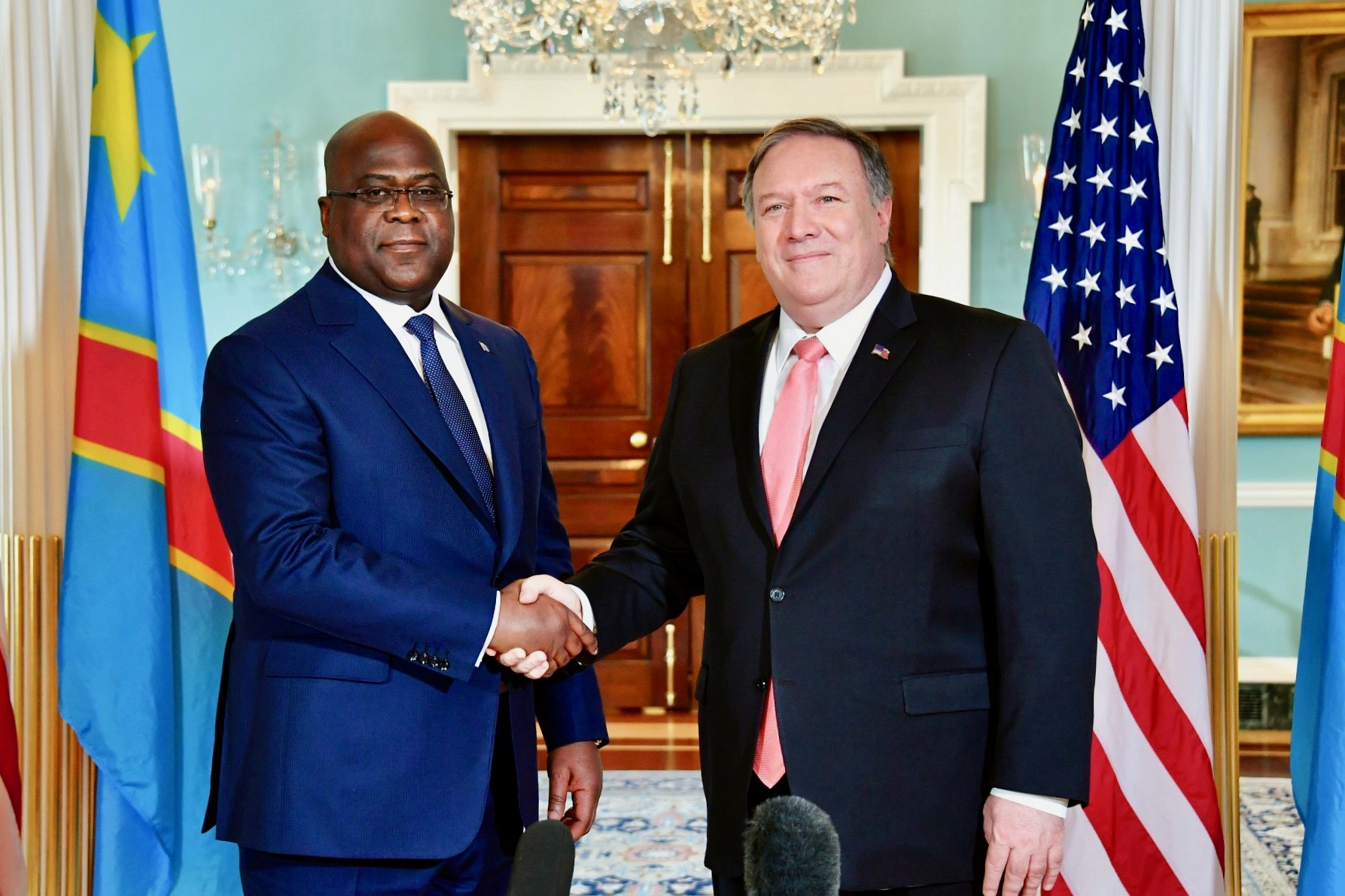
Tshisekedi with U.S. Secretary of State Mike Pompeo, April 2019

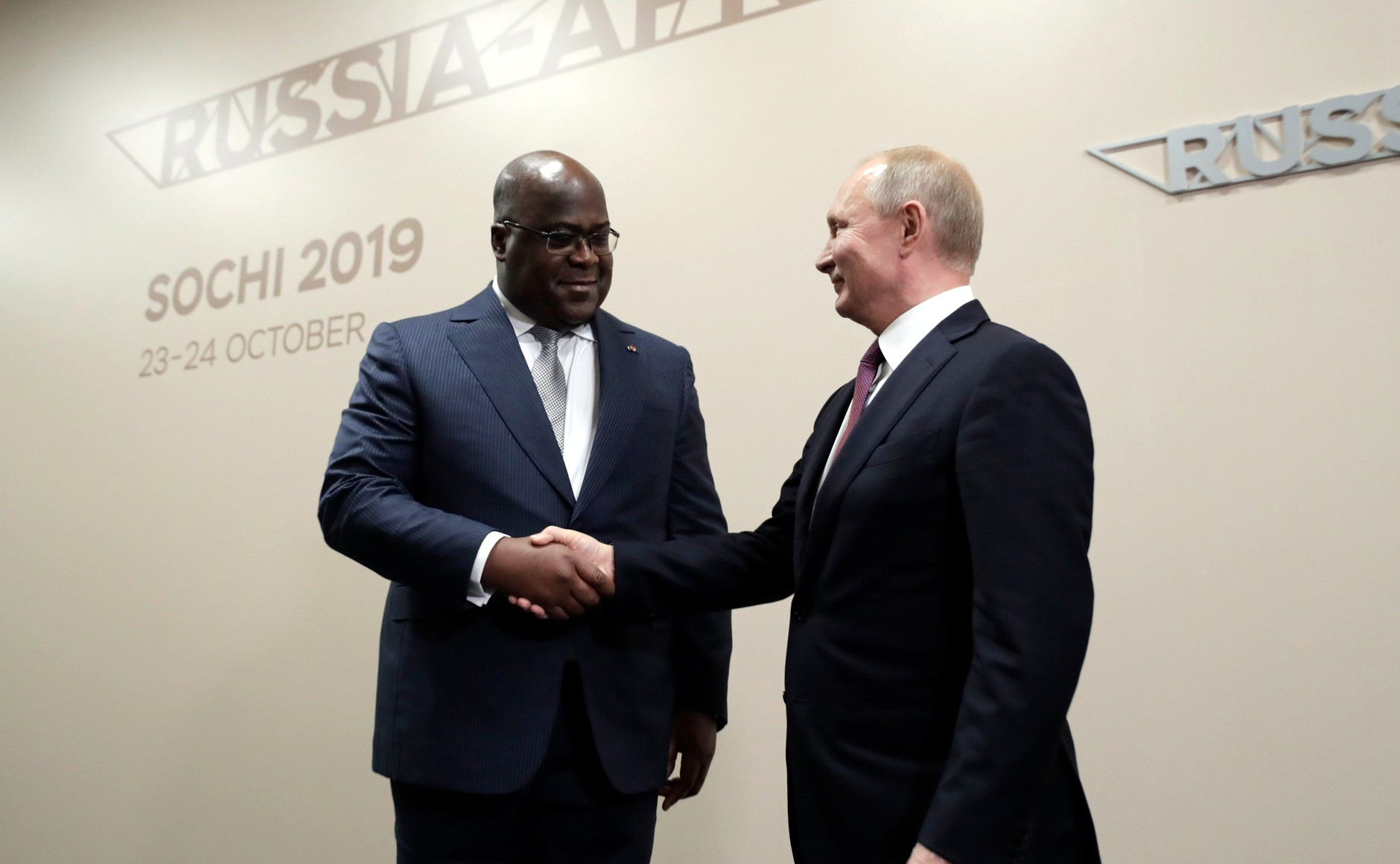
Tshisekedi and Russian President Vladimir Putin at the 2019 Russia–Africa Summit on 23 October 2019

#	Country	Areas visited	Dates	Details
1	Angola	Luanda	5 February 2019	Met with President João Lourenço on his first official trip abroad as President.
2	Kenya	Nairobi	6 February 2019	Met with President Uhuru Kenyatta.
3	Republic of the Congo	Brazzaville	7 February 2019	Met with President Denis Sassou Nguesso.
4	Ethiopia	Addis Ababa	10–11 February 2019	Attended the 32nd Ordinary Session of the Assembly of the African Union.
5	Namibia	Windhoek	5–6 March 2019	Official visit. Met with President Hage Geingob and former President Sam Nujoma.
6	United States	Washington, D.C.	3–6 April 2019	Official visit. Met with Secretary of State Mike Pompeo.
7	Russia	Sochi	23–24 October 2019	Attended the 2019 Russia-Africa Summit.
8	Uganda	Entebbe	9–10 November 2019	State visit. Attended the Uganda–DRC Joint Business Forum, which was aimed at enhancing bilateral trade between the two countries. He was accompanied by a delegation of more than 100 officials, including seven ministers.
9	Germany	Berlin	14 November 2019	Working visit at the invitation of the German government. Met with Bundestag President Wolfgang Schäuble and addressed members of the German–African parliamentary friendship group at the Bundestag.

== 2020s ==
=== 2020 ===
#	Country	Areas visited	Dates	Details
10	United Kingdom	London	19–21 January 2020	Visit to take part in the UK–Africa Investment Summit, his first visit to the United Kingdom as president.
11	Switzerland	Davos	21–23 January 2020	Attended the Annual Meeting of the World Economic Forum (WEF). Met with Belgian Prime Minister Sophie Wilmes on 22 January.
12	United States	Washington, D.C.	1–3 March 2020	Official visit. Addressed the American Israel Public Affairs Committee (AIPAC) on 1 March, where he announced plans to appoint an ambassador to Israel, and met with Secretary of State Mike Pompeo on 3 March.

=== 2021 ===
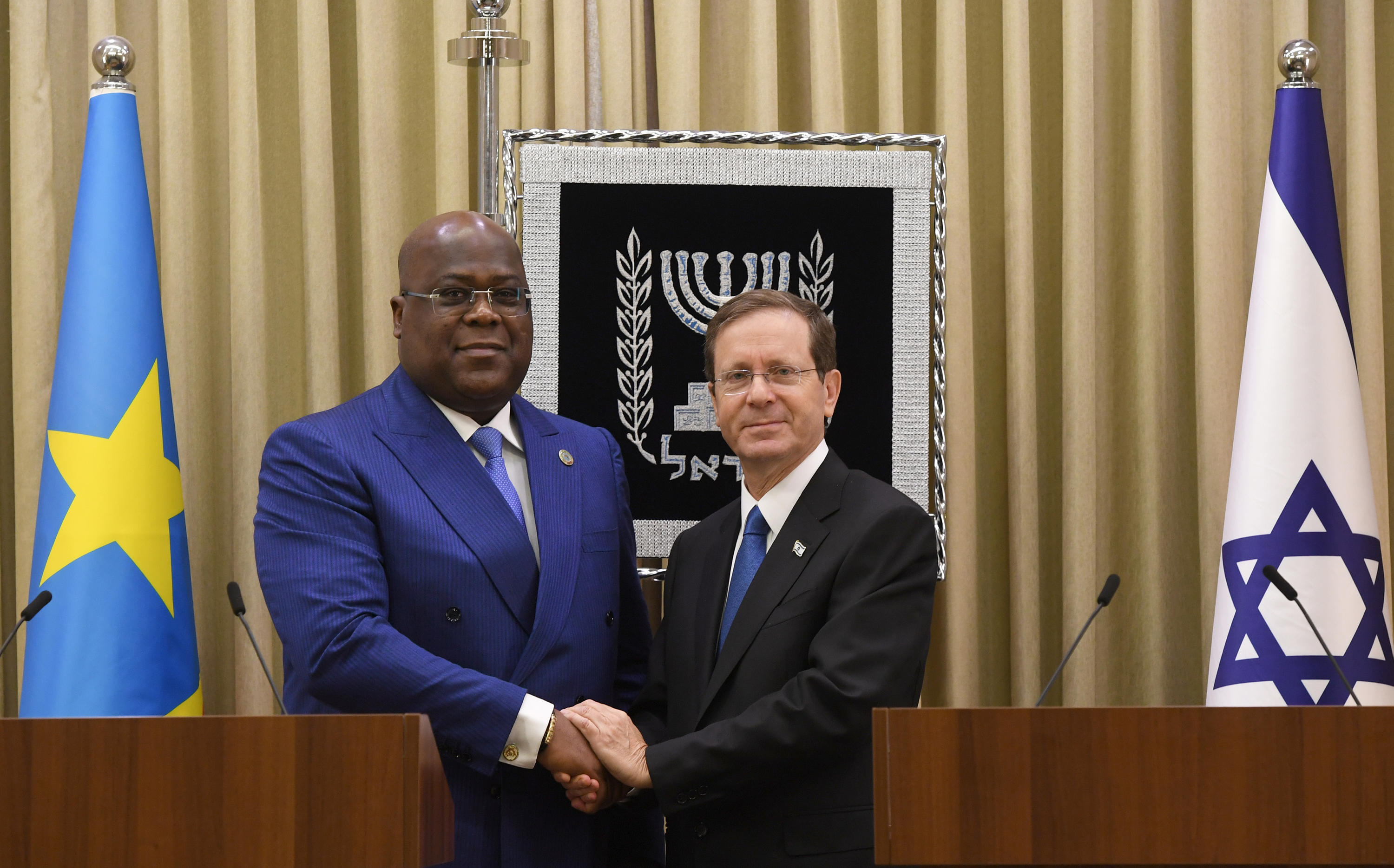
Tshisekedi with Israeli President Isaac Herzog in Jerusalem, Israel, October 2021

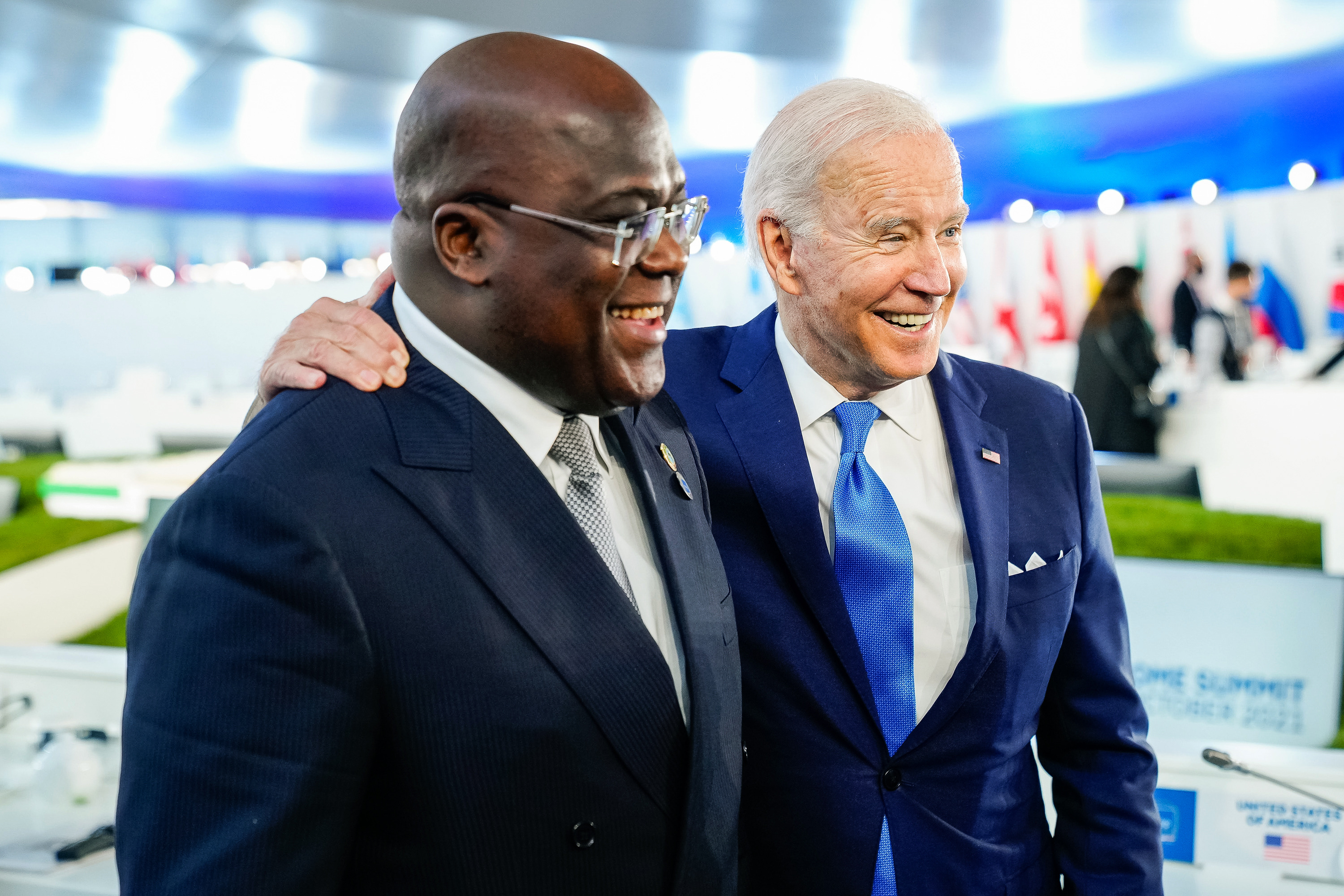
Tshisekedi and U.S. President Joe Biden at the 2021 G20 Rome summit, October 2021

#	Country	Areas visited	Dates	Details
13	Egypt	Cairo	1–3 February 2021	Official visit, his first to Egypt as president. Met with President Abdel Fattah el-Sisi and attended the launch of four industrial projects financed by Afreximbank, with a combined value of US$400 million.
14	Ethiopia	Addis Ababa	5–7 February 2021	Attended the 34th Ordinary Session of the Assembly of the African Union, where he succeeded Cyril Ramaphosa as Chairperson of the African Union for 2021.
15	Qatar	Doha	28–30 March 2021	Working visit. Met with Emir Tamim bin Hamad Al Thani. Here, the two countries signed several agreements and memoranda of understanding covering economic, trade and technical cooperation, as well as aviation and maritime cooperation, and the protection of expected investments.
16	Republic of the Congo	Brazzaville	15–16 April 2021	Attended the inauguration of President Denis Sassou Nguesso on 16 April.
17	France	Paris	17–18 May 2021	Attended the Summit on the Financing of African Economies hosted by President Emmanuel Macron, in his capacity as Chairperson of the African Union. Also met with Tunisian President Kais Saied on 17 May.
18	Rwanda	Rubavu	25 June 2021	Working visit. Met with President Paul Kagame at the La Corniche border post and toured Rubavu to assess damage from earthquakes that followed the eruption of Mount Nyiragongo. Kagame reciprocated with a visit to Goma the following day.
19	Israel	Jerusalem	26–28 October 2021	Met with President Isaac Herzog and Prime Minister Naftali Bennett.
20	Italy	Rome	30–31 October 2021	Attended the 2021 G20 Rome summit.

=== 2022 ===
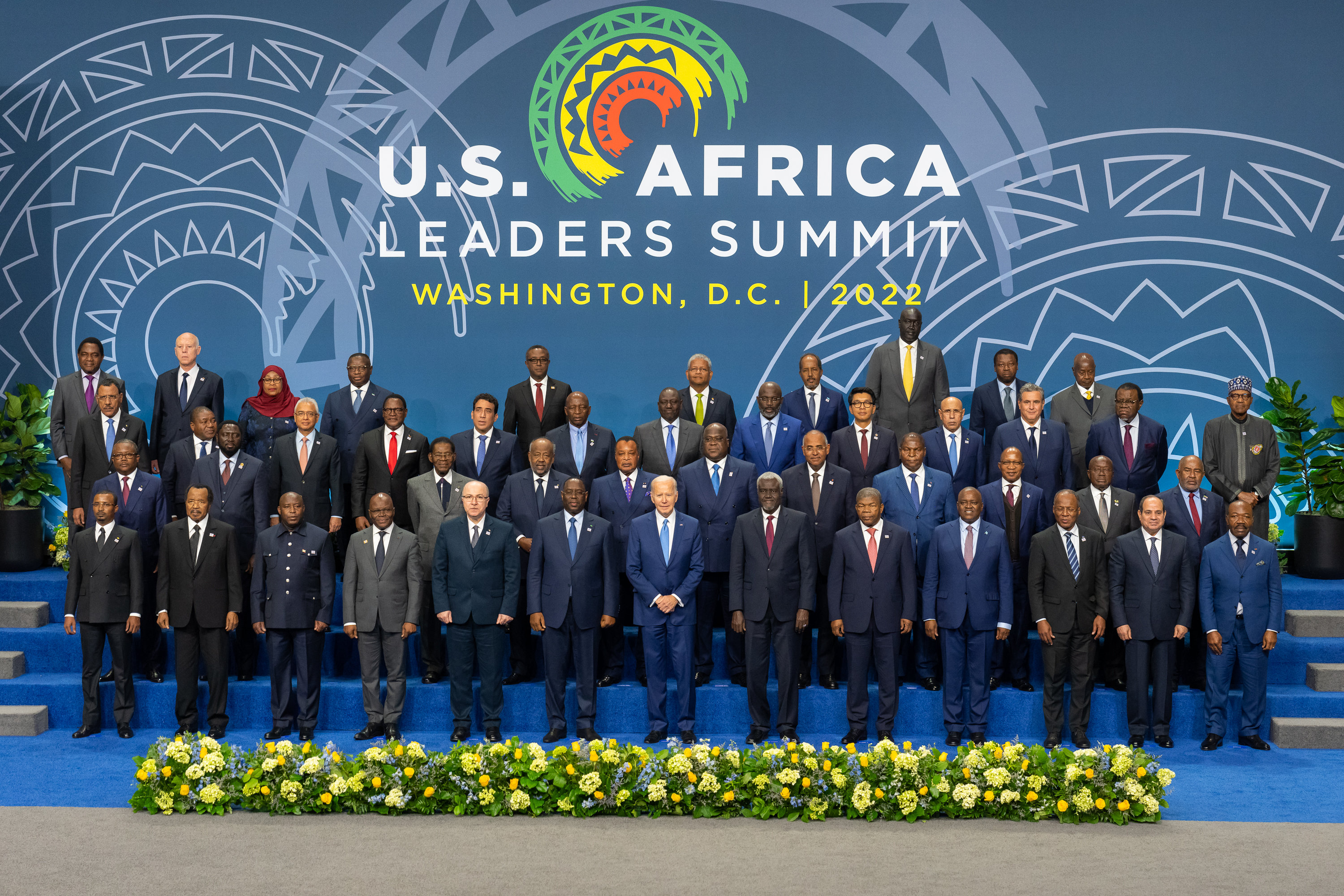
Tshisekedi with various African leaders and U.S. President Joe Biden at the United States–Africa Summit, December 2022

#	Country	Areas visited	Dates	Details
21	Zambia	Lusaka	29 April 2022	Official visit. Met with President Hakainde Hichilema and was scheduled to preside with him over the signing of a bilateral cooperation agreement between the two countries, following the launch of a joint Zambia–DRC Battery Precursor Initiative.
22	Angola	Luanda	5–6 July 2022	Attended a tripartite summit with President João Lourenço and Rwandan President Paul Kagame aimed at easing tensions between the DRC and Rwanda. The summit was convened by Lourenço in his capacity as chair of the International Conference on the Great Lakes Region, with a mandate from the African Union to mediate.
23	United States	New York City	20 September 2022	Attended the 77th Session of the United Nations General Assembly.
24	Saudi Arabia	Jeddah	15–16 October 2022	State visit.
25	Indonesia	Bali	14–16 November 2022	Attended the 2022 G20 Bali summit. Held bilateral meetings with President Joko Widodo, Chinese President Xi Jinping, and Dutch Prime Minister Mark Rutte.
26	United Kingdom	London	22–23 November 2022	State visit.
27	United States	Washington, D.C.	13–15 December 2022	Attended the United States–Africa Leaders Summit.

=== 2023 ===
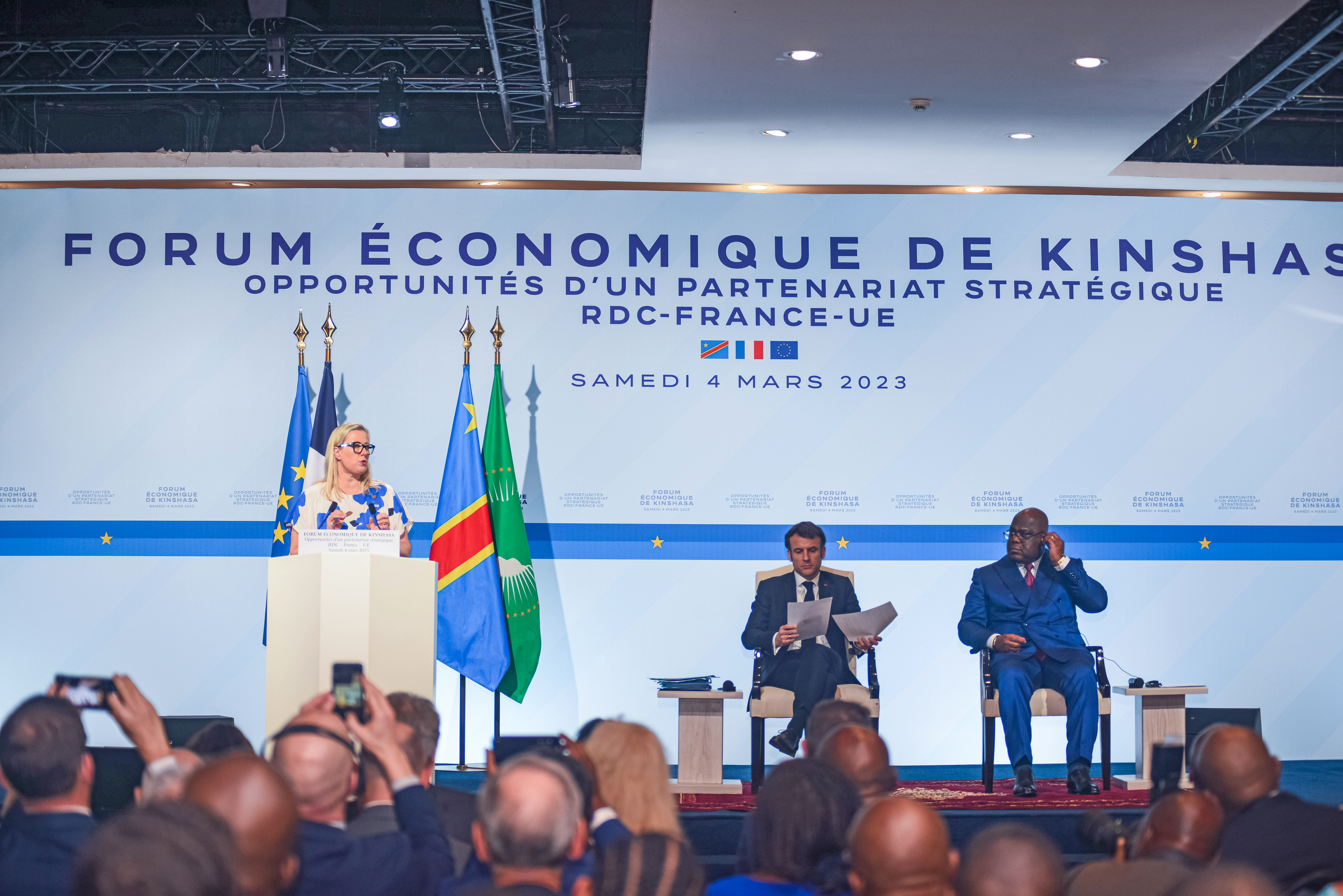
Tshisekedi with French President Emmanuel Macron and European Commissioner Jutta Urpilainen in Kinshasa, 4 March 2023

#	Country	Areas visited	Dates	Details
28	Ethiopia	Addis Ababa	17–19 February 2023	Attended the 36th Ordinary Session of the Assembly of the African Union.
29	China	Beijing	24–29 May 2023	State visit. Met with President Xi Jinping.
30	Switzerland	Geneva	15 June 2023	Attended the World of Work Summit during the 111th Session of the International Labour Conference.
31	France	Paris	22–23 June 2023	Attended the Summit for a New Global Financial Pact.
32	Egypt	Cairo	21 October 2023	Attended the Cairo Summit for Peace and met with President Abdel Fattah el-Sisi.
33	Qatar	Doha	14–15 November 2023	Met with Emir Tamim bin Hamad Al Thani.
34	United Arab Emirates	Dubai	2 December 2023	Working visit during COP28.

=== 2024 ===
#	Country	Areas visited	Dates	Details
35	Germany	Berlin	28 April 2024	Working visit. Met with German Chancellor Olaf Scholz.
36	France	Paris	29 April – 1 May 2024	Official visit. Met with French President Emmanuel Macron.
37	China	Beijing	2–4 September 2024	State visit. Met with President Xi Jinping.
38	United States	New York City	22 September 2024	Attended the 79th Session of the United Nations General Assembly.
39	Hungary	Budapest	29 September – 1 October 2024	State visit. Met with Prime Minister Viktor Orbán.
40	Uganda	Entebbe	30 October 2024	Working visit. Met with President Yoweri Museveni.

=== 2025 ===
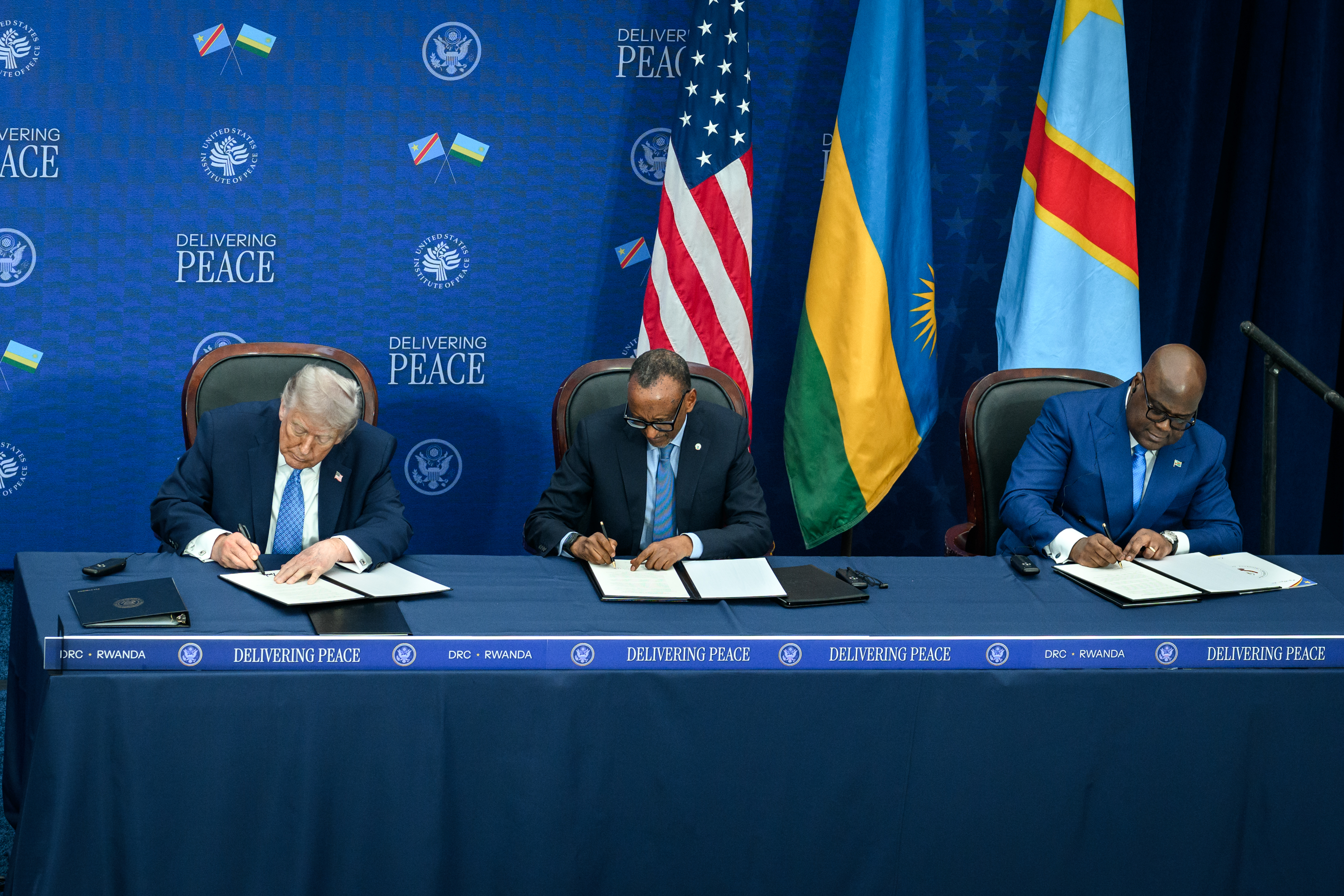
The signing of the Washington Accords Peace Argeement by presidents Donald Trump, Paul Kagame, and Félix Tshisekedi, 4 December 2025

#	Country	Areas visited	Dates	Details
41	Kazakhstan	Astana	9–10 September 2025	State visit. Met with President Kassym-Jomart Tokayev.
42	South Africa	Pretoria	18 September 2025	Working visit. Met with President Cyril Ramaphosa at the Mahlamba Ndlopfu presidential residence.
43	United States	New York City	21–26 September 2025	Attended the 80th Session of the United Nations General Assembly and the events marking the UN's 80th anniversary. He was named a vice-president of the session and was scheduled to address the Assembly on 23 September.
44	Belgium	Brussels	9 October 2025	Official visit. Met with European Commission President Ursula von der Leyen at the Berlaymont building.
45	United States	Washington, D.C.	4 December 2025	Travelled with Rwandan President Paul Kagame to meet U.S. President Donald Trump in order to ratify the DRC–Rwanda peace agreement and the Regional Economic Integration Framework.

=== 2026 ===
Tshisekedi and Russian President Vladimir Putin at the 2026 Russia–Africa Summit on 28 October 2026

#	Country	Areas visited	Dates	Details
46	Angola	Luanda	5 January 2026	Working visit. Met with President João Lourenço and discussed peace talks concerning the M23 conflict.
47	Angola	Luanda	8 January 2026	Working visit. Held discussions with President João Lourenço that focused on framing a potential intra-Congolese political dialogue, defining key players for regional mediation, and supporting peace frameworks under the Washington and Doha processes.
48	Togo	Lomé	12 January 2026	Working visit. Met with President Faure Gnassingbé.
49	Switzerland	Davos	18–23 January 2026	Attended the 56th Annual Meeting of the World Economic Forum (WEF).
50	France	Paris	23 January 2026	Working visit. Met with President Emmanuel Macron following his trip to the World Economic Forum.
51	United Arab Emirates	Abu Dhabi	2 February 2026	Working visit. Met with President Mohamed bin Zayed Al Nahyan and signed a landmark Comprehensive Economic Partnership Agreement (CEPA) at the Qasr Al Watan presidential palace.
52	United States	Washington, D.C.	4–5 February 2026	Working visit. Met with President Donald Trump.
53	Angola	Luanda	9 February 2026	Working visit. Held discussions with other African leaders as part of broader diplomatic talks.
54	France	Paris	25 February 2026	Working visit. Met with President Emmanuel Macron to discuss the escalating security crisis and conflict in eastern Democratic Republic of the Congo involving the M23 rebel group, alongside regional mediation efforts.
55	United States	Chicago	7 March 2026	Attended the funeral service and tribute ceremony for Reverend Jesse Jackson.
56	Qatar	Doha	1–2 April 2026	Working visit. Met with Emir Tamim bin Hamad Al Thani in a gesture of solidarity amid regional tensions in the Middle East. The two leaders discussed the conflict in eastern DR Congo and the Doha process, as well as Qatari investment in the DRC.
57	Uganda	Kampala	11–12 May 2026	Official visit. Attended the inauguration of President Yoweri Museveni on 12 May. Both countries were expected to sign six memoranda of understanding on trade, infrastructure and security following the ninth session of the Joint Permanent Commission.
58	Kenya	Nairobi	12 May 2026	Attended the closing of the Africa–France Summit, travelling from Uganda.
59	Hungary	Budapest	28 May–2 June 2026	Attended the 2026 UEFA Champions League Final at the Puskás Aréna.
60	Egypt	Cairo	10 June 2026	Bilateral visit. Met with President Abdel Fattah el-Sisi to discuss strengthening bilateral ties and regional security.
61	United States	Houston	16 June 2026	Attended the DR Congo national team's opening group match against Portugal at the 2026 FIFA World Cup, which was the country's first World Cup appearance in 52 years.
62	Republic of the Congo	Brazzaville	3 July 2026	Working visit. Met with President Denis Sassou Nguesso.
63	Gabon	Libreville	15–17 August 2026	Guest of honour of President Brice Oligui Nguema at the celebrations of the 66th anniversary of Gabon's independence. Attended the 17 August commemoration at the Esplanade de la Concorde alongside the leaders of The Gambia, Guinea-Bissau and São Tomé and Príncipe, and took part in the inauguration of the Concorde monument.
64	Tanzania	Dar es Salaam	17–18 August 2026	Working visit that was aimed at bolstering trade and investment ties.
65	Israel	Jerusalem	1 September 2026	Working visit. Met with President Isaac Herzog, who welcomed him in Jerusalem and said the visit reciprocated Tshisekedi's hosting of Herzog in Kinshasa. Foreign Minister Thérèse Kayikwamba Wagner accompanied him, and held talks with Israeli Foreign Minister Gideon Sa'ar on security and economic cooperation and on implementation of the DRC–Rwanda peace agreement.
66	Republic of the Congo	Brazzaville	3 October 2026	Working visit. Met with President Denis Sassou Nguesso to discuss bilateral cooperation and regional issues, days after Minister of Regional Integration Floribert Anzuluni delivered a message from Tshisekedi to Sassou Nguesso in Brazzaville.
67	Russia	Moscow	28–29 October 2026	Attended the 2026 Russia–Africa Summit, where he met with President Vladimir Putin. The visit came amid continued tensions between the DRC and Rwanda over the M23 conflict in the east of the country.
68	Republic of the Congo	Brazzaville	5–6 November 2026	Working visit at the invitation of President Denis Sassou Nguesso. Took part in a mini-summit on environmental protection held on 6 November for the 40th National Tree Day, which coincided with the launch of the UN decade for afforestation and reforestation.
69	Turkey	Antalya	10–12 November 2026	Attended the 2026 United Nations Climate Change Conference (COP31). Addressed a forests roundtable on 11 November, calling for shared responsibility in bearing the cost of protecting tropical forests, and met with President Recep Tayyip Erdoğan on 12 November on the sidelines to discuss bilateral relations and the conflict in eastern DR Congo.
70	Cambodia	Phnom Penh	14–16 November 2026	Attended the 20th Francophonie Summit, amid a dispute between the DR Congo and Rwanda over the election of the next Secretary-General of the International Organisation of the Francophonie.

== See also ==
- Foreign relations of the Democratic Republic of the Congo
