= Democratic Republic of the Congo–Rwanda conflict (2022–present) =

- Part of the Kivu conflict
- Military situation as of 10 May 2025 Controlled by the M23 Movement and allied militias Controlled by the Congolese army and allied militias Presence of Ugandan armed forces Presence of Burundian armed forces Presence of Wazalendo militias (DRC-aligned): Resources: Gold mines; Tantalum, tungsten or tin mines
Date	March 27, 2022 – ongoing (4 years, 7 months and 1 week)
Location	Central Africa
Status	Ongoing; Peace agreement signed, though fighting continues

Belligerents
Democratic Republic of the Congo; Burundi; Uganda; FDLR (Note: DRC support for the FDLR was first alleged by Rwanda. A report by the United Nations has found that members of the DRC army have fought alongside the FDLR.); Peacekeepers: SADC (until 2025); EAC (until 2024); United Nations	Rwanda; Congo River Alliance; March 23 Movement; Twirwaneho; RED-Tabara; Uganda (alleged by the DRC, denied)

Commanders and leaders
Félix Tshisekedi; Peter Cirimwami †	Paul Kagame; Mubarak Muganga

Units involved
(Democratic Republic of the Congo) FARDC; (Democratic Republic of the Congo) Wazalendo; (Burundi) FDNB; (United Nations) MONUSCO; (Southern African Development Community) SAMIDRC	Rwandan Defence Force; March 23 Movement; Twirwaneho; RED-Tabara

Strength
40,000–60,000; 25,000; 11,000; 1,200	(Rwanda) 7,000–12,000; 22,000

Casualties and losses
- 7,000+ killed and 600,000+ displaced between November 2024 and March 2025; 413+ killed and 200,000 displaced in December 2025

A conflict began between the Democratic Republic of the Congo (DRC) and Rwanda in 2022 after Rwandan forces intervened in the DRC to provide military support to the March 23 Movement (M23) rebel group, including fighting alongside them against the Congolese military (FARDC) and pro-government militias. A peace agreement between Rwanda and the DRC was signed on 27 June 2025, though fighting has continued and Rwandan troops remain in the DRC.

Since the Second Congo War the eastern provinces of the DRC have been the site of an ongoing insurgency by various rebel groups, most notably the March 23 Movement (M23) in North Kivu and its Twirwaneho affiliate in South Kivu, and the Allied Democratic Forces (ADF) in Ituri and North Kivu. The current stage of the conflict is related to an ongoing campaign that began in March 2022 by the M23 Movement, which the DRC, United Nations, United States, and other Western countries accuse Rwanda of not only supporting but actively fighting for the insurgents. Rwanda and M23 have also accused the DRC of working together with the Democratic Forces for the Liberation of Rwanda (FDLR), an ethnic Hutu paramilitary group that took part in the Rwandan Genocide. Both the Congo and Rwanda deny they support the FDLR and M23, respectively, contrary to research and reports that confirm both sides' allegations.

Burundi, which has accused Rwanda of orchestrating a 2015 coup attempt, deployed troops to assist the DRC against the M23 offensive. There were as many as 25,000 Burundian troops in eastern Congo until early February 2025, when the majority withdrew, leaving around 3,000. The MONUSCO peacekeeping mission has maintained that it is not involved in the conflict apart from its role in defending the region from militants, but has been accused by Rwanda of taking sides due to its cooperation with the Congolese armed forces. Meanwhile, the Congolese government has asked MONUSCO peacekeepers to leave the DRC due to a "failure to protect civilians from armed groups."

There were two efforts at peace negotiations organized between the DRC and Rwanda: one hosted by Kenya in 2022, which failed, and another hosted by Angola in 2024, the latter leading to a ceasefire agreement in August. Fighting between Congolese forces and Rwandan-backed M23 rebels resumed in October 2024 after having slowed down, and intensified towards the end of the year. Planned negotiations between Rwandan president Paul Kagame and Congolese president Félix Tshisekedi in December were cancelled over disagreements about preconditions. The Rwanda Defence Force had up to 4,000 troops in the DRC by a UN estimate in December 2024, and this increased to as much as 12,000 by March 2025.

During January 2025, the rebels carried out a successful offensive on Goma, the capital of the DRC's North Kivu province, displacing over 400,000 people and causing the DRC to cut off its diplomatic ties with Rwanda. The Congolese government called Rwandan military support for the rebels a "declaration of war." The fall of Goma after several days of fighting in late January has been the largest escalation of the Kivu conflict since M23 first occupied the city in 2012. M23 continued its advance into the rest of North Kivu and into South Kivu during February, capturing the latter's capital Bukavu. The African Union has called on M23 to withdraw to prevent the "balkanization" of the DR Congo and the United Nations Security Council adopted Resolution 2773 that also called on Rwanda to end its support for M23. Following negotiations in June 2025 brokered by the United States, Rwanda and the DRC agreed to a preliminary peace treaty. The final agreement consists of Rwanda withdrawing its troops within 90 days and the DRC ending all support for the FDLR. As of September 2025, Rwandan troops have not withdrawn. Rwanda was accused of violating the agreement, It has also been questioned if the peace agreement even resulted in the conflict ending.

== Background ==
When the Rwandan Civil War ended in 1994 as a victory for the Rwandan Patriotic Front, a Tutsi-led army founded by Rwandan exiles in Uganda, the Hutu extremists that perpetrated the genocide against Tutsis in Rwanda fled across the border of neighboring Zaire (present-day Democratic Republic of the Congo). These elements, consisting of the former Rwandan armed forces and the Interahamwe paramilitary group, entered the Kivu region in eastern Zaire along with Hutu civilian refugees from Rwanda. There the Hutu militants established militia groups to wage an insurgency against the new RPF-led government. This led to the First Congo War in 1996, "to a large degree an extension" of the Rwandan Civil War. Rwanda under Paul Kagame intervened during the First Congo War (1996–1997), the Second Congo War (1998–2003), and the Kivu conflict (since 2004). After the end of the Second Congo War, Rwanda supported the CNDP from 2006, and later the M23 movement, which was founded by former CNDP members in 2012. Rwanda exploited the situation to facilitate large-scale looting of Congolese mineral resources, while crimes against civilians escalated.

== Timeline ==
=== 2022 ===
==== March 2022 ====
Soon after the beginning of the offensive, the Democratic Republic of the Congo claimed that Rwanda supported the insurgent operation, a claim which was denied by the Rwandan government and the rebels. International Crisis Group researcher Onesphore Sematumba argued that claims about Rwandan aid were believable. He suggested that the resurgence of M23 was probably influenced by Rwanda's wish to stop an infrastructure project which would link the DR Congo and Uganda.

==== May 2022 ====
Congolese forces said that they had captured two Rwandan soldiers that had been sent into the DRC in disguise in May. Both were released on 11 June. On 23 May, FARDC troops reportedly shelled Musanze District, in the Northern Province of Rwanda, injuring several people. Two days later, the DRC ordered the suspension of all RwandAir flights. Rwanda condemned the action, and RwandAir decided to retaliate by cancelling flights to Kinshasa, Lubumbashi, and Goma.

In response to these conflicts, African Union Chairman and President of Senegal Macky Sall said on 29 May that the African Union was supporting a "peaceful resolution" to the tensions.

==== June 2022 ====
Mediation attempts continued into the following month; on 2 June, Angolan President João Lourenço attempted to mediate a resolution between the two countries in Luanda. On 8 June, Alexander De Croo, the Prime Minister of Belgium, compared the situation in the eastern DRC to that of Ukraine in a visit to Kinshasa, additionally making comments implying his support for the Congo in its border crisis with Rwanda.

On 9 June, the DRC said it had discovered that 500 Rwandan special forces in disguise had been sent into the area near the town of Tshanzu in North Kivu. The day afterwards, the DRC accused Rwanda of firing rockets at a school in Biruma, killing two children and seriously injuring another person of unspecified age. Rwanda also said that the Congo had fired rockets into Western Rwanda from the direction of Bunagana.

The UN called for a ceasefire between the two countries, but on 12 June, the DRC alleged that Rwanda intended to occupy the city of Bunagana, which M23 forces would then capture one day later. The arrival of the M23 forced about 30,000 people to flee to Uganda. The DRC claimed that Rwandan forces were helping to occupy the city. The rebels claimed that taking Bunagana wasn't their goal, but decided to do it after repeated attacks by the Congolese army. They also said that they were open to doing direct negotiations with the government. The DRC described the fall of Bunagana as "no less than an invasion" by Rwanda. Two senior Congolese security sources claimed that Uganda was also helping the M23 in their offensive. That same day, Rwanda charged the MONUSCO mission of taking sides in the conflict, which it said was allowing the Congo to carry out cross-border attacks in Rwanda.

The heavy fighting also caused about 137 Congolese soldiers and 37 police officers to flee into Uganda, where they surrendered to Ugandan forces. A Kinyarwanda-speaking lieutenant colonel was attacked and beaten by a mob in Kisangani.

On 15 June, thousands of demonstrators organized a protest against Rwandan actions in Goma. The protest quickly turned into an anti-Rwandan riot, as an angry mob pillaged and attacked shops owned by Rwandans, seizing vehicles to check if Rwandans were inside. Congolese riot police fired tear gas at protesters after some tried to enter a border checkpoint at the Rwandan border. Several Rwandans in Goma responded by fleeing the country. On the same day, the DRC suspended all "memoranda of understanding, agreements, and conventions concluded with Rwanda", demanding the withdrawal of all alleged Rwandan military personnel within the boundaries of the country.

Just a few hours after Congolese security officials called for the DRC to cut all ties with Rwanda, a Congolese soldier crossed into Rubavu District carrying an AK-47 and was shot to death by a Rwanda National Police officer on 17 June. The RDF said that the soldier was killed after he started shooting at civilians and security forces, and had injured two officers. The Congo shut down the two countries' border in response to the officer's death, adding that it would open an investigation into the events. As a vehicle brought back the officer's body to Goma, a crowd made up of hundreds of people followed the vehicle shouting "hero, hero" and describing President of Rwanda Paul Kagame as an assassin. Some members of the crowd were documented yelling hateful slogans against Tutsis.

==== July 2022 ====
Representatives of Rwanda and the DRC both came to an agreement held in Angola on 6 July to begin a "de-escalation process" between the two nations. M23 leader Willy Ngoma ordered a new offensive the next day, asserting that "Only the M23 can sign the cease-fire with the government."

==== August 2022 ====
In early August, a report for the United Nations by independent experts was leaked to the press. The report provided evidence that Rwandan troops had entered Congolese territory to support M23, fighting alongside the insurgents. These findings led to calls by journalists and officials in the DRC for the UN to sanction Rwanda.

==== October 2022 ====
On 24 October, a Rwandan soldier running away from the Rwandan military's 401st battalion surrendered himself to a MONUSCO base in Kiwanja, saying that he had been sent to Rwanda as part of a military operation and begged the UN troops not to send him back to Rwanda. He was handed over to FARDC forces on 4 November.

The Kivu Security Barometre, a project of the New York University's Congo Research Group, found that satellite photos showing a battle from late October 2022 in Rugari, Rutshuru Territory revealed soldiers with insignias similar to those of the Rwandan Defence Force.

==== November 2022 ====
On 19 November, a Congolese soldier was shot dead as he crossed a border post near Rubavu. The Rwanda Defence Force said that he had been killed after shooting at the guard towers. The FARDC confirmed that the soldier had been killed, identifying him as a recent recruit to the armed forces who went missing after he had gotten lost during an army patrol. The DRC and Rwanda both say they are investigating the incident.

At the 2022 Francophonie summit in Tunis, the DRC representative Jean-Michel Sama Lukonde refused to take part in a group photo with other Francophone leaders (including the Rwandan representative) as a protest against Rwanda's actions in the Congo.

The East African Community demanded, on 24 November, for both a ceasefire between Rwanda and the DRC as well as ordering the M23 movement to withdraw from all occupied territories. The EAC stated it would lead a military intervention to quell the unrest in Kivu if the orders were not obeyed. At a summit in Luanda, Angola, both Rwanda and the DRC agreed to hold a ceasefire which was officially enforced on 25 November at 16:00 GMT.

The M23 rejected the ceasefire, since they had not been invited to participate in the dialogue. A spokesman for the rebel group told Agence France-Presse that "M23 has seen the document on social media. [...] There was nobody [from the M23] in the summit, so it doesn't really concern us... Normally when there is a cease-fire it is between the two warring sides."

==== December 2022 ====
On 5 December, the DRC announced that 272 civilians were killed in a massacre in the eastern town of Kishishe, North Kivu. The Congolese government blamed the killings on the M23, though M23 themselves denied culpability. An investigation was opened by Jean-Paul Mukolo, attorney general of the DRC.

=== 2023 ===
==== January 2023 ====
On 19 January 2023, The Rwandan government claimed that the DRC had a "clear indication" that it was "preparing for war." Rwanda also claimed that the DRC had imported European mercenaries on their behalf. Five days later, on 24 January, a Congolese Su-25 was damaged by MANPAD fire by Rwandan forces after Rwanda claimed it violated its airspace. The attack, which happened between the cities of Gisenyi and Goma, was responded to with a statement that said, "The government considers this umpteenth attack by Rwanda as a deliberate action." It was also said that the plane suffered only minor damage.

==== July 2023 ====
The DRC claimed on 27 July that it had repelled an incursion by the Rwandan army north of Goma. According to local sources, a Rwandan soldier was killed in the clash.

==== October 2023 ====
On 18 October, the UN expressed concern about the risk of a direct war between both countries.

==== November 2023 ====
On November 6, U.S. Secretary of State Antony Blinken called on Congolese President Félix Tshisekedi and Rwandan President Paul Kagame to de-escalate the conflict after a surge of rebel clashes in Kinshasa. On 21 November, the two leaders agreed on steps to deescalate the tensions between both countries, according to U.S. intelligence. The following day, M23 rebels claimed that they captured the town of Mweso.

==== December 2023 ====
In a speech made on 9 December, Tshisekedi said, "if Kagame [wants] to behave like Adolf Hitler by having expansionist aims, I promise he will end up like Adolf Hitler". A Rwandan government spokesperson condemned this statement, accusing Tshisekedi of making "a loud and clear threat".

On 20 December, Tshisekedi threatened an invasion of Rwanda, stating "I've had enough of invasions and M23 rebels backed by Kigali," being met with chants of "Kagame out!"

=== 2024 ===
==== January 2024 ====
In the first incident of the year, a Congolese soldier was killed by Rwandan forces on January 16 in Rwanda's Rubavu District. The soldier allegedly opened fire on Rwandan soldiers before being shot dead. Two other Congolese soldiers were arrested in the same event.

Félix Tshisekedi was sworn into his second term as president having promised to deal with the unrest in the east of the country.

==== February 2024 ====
On 17 February, the U.S. Department of State published a statement condemning Rwanda's alleged support of M23, while calling for the Rwandan government to remove all RDF personnel and surface-to-air missile systems from the DRC. The Rwandan Ministry of Foreign Affairs and Cooperation (MINAFFET) responded with a rejection of U.S. demands, stating their recent moves were justified as defensive measures against the FDLR, and questioned the ability of the U.S. to act as a credible mediator in the African Great Lakes. The Rwandan statement ended with an assertion that the FDLR must be demobilized and repatriated to Rwanda, with MINAFFET furthermore proclaiming, "Rwanda reserves the right to take any legitimate measures to defend our country, so long as this threat exists."

The DRC accused Rwanda of carrying out a drone attack that damaged a civilian aircraft at Goma International Airport. Protests were held in the city and western flags were burned.

==== March 2024 ====
M23 rebels took control of the town of Nyanzale.

==== May 2024 ====
On May 4, refugee camps near Goma were struck by bombs in coordinated attacks that killed 12 and injured at least 20. Both the Congolese administration and the U.S. Department of State blamed the Rwandan military and M23 for the attack. Yolande Makolo, spokeswoman for the Rwandan government, denied Rwandan culpability, saying on X, “The RDF, a professional army, would never attack an IDP camp. Look to the lawless FDLR [and] Wazalendo supported by the FARDC, for this kind of atrocity.”

==== August 2024 ====
On August 30, 2024, the Democratic Republic of Congo committed to suing Rwanda before the East African Court of Justice.

==== December 2024 ====
A planned summit between Tshisekedi and Kagame on 15 December 2024, meant to address the disarmament of the FDLR, was canceled after Kagame withdrew. This development reinforced suspicions that Rwanda's presence in eastern DRC was less about security concerns and more about economic exploitation. The Congolese government stated that "If Kigali is in good faith in the negotiations and on its promise to withdraw ... its troops from Congolese soil, the conflict will end with the M23, and at the same time it will stop with Rwanda."

=== 2025 ===
==== January 2025 ====
A rebel advance towards the city of Goma, the North Kivu provincial capital, during January 2025 displaced over 178,000 people. The town of Minova in South Kivu, a key point on the supply route to Goma, was captured on 21 January by M23. The Congolese government accused a Rwandan sniper of killing North Kivu's military governor.

As the rebels approached the city, on 25 January the DRC ended diplomatic relations with Rwanda, recalling its embassy staff from the country and ordering the Rwandan embassy in Kinshasa to end its operations. A spokesman for the Congolese military claimed that "Rwanda is determined to seize the city of Goma." The UN estimates that 4,000 Rwandan soldiers are in the DRC assisting the rebel group, and the Rwandan military command set up a headquarters one mile away from the Congolese border, although Rwanda denies involvement in the conflict.

On 26 January fighting started between Congolese army and M23 troops in the outskirts of Goma. UN sources estimated that around 500–1,000 Rwandan troops are helping the M23 rebels in the Goma area. An emergency session of the UN Security Council was held, where Congolese foreign minister Thérèse Kayikwamba Wagner called Rwanda's actions a "declaration of war." She also asked the UN Security Council to impose sanctions on Rwanda.

Shelling by Congolese army troops killed five civilians in Gisenyi, Rwanda, on 27 January.

==== February 2025 ====
On 5 February 2025, the M23 captured Goma, and vehicle wreckage was seen from the heavy fighting.

On 7 February 2025, the United Nations Human Rights Council (UNHRC) condemned Rwanda's support for M23 rebels in eastern Congo and launched an investigation to examine rights violations. The council urged M23 and Rwandan forces to cease abuses and allow humanitarian aid. Volker Türk said that estimated 3,000 people were killed and nearly 2,900 injured since 26 January 2025.

On 18 February 2025, Volker Türk accused Rwanda-backed M23 rebels of executing and recruiting children and attacking aid facilities after seizing Bukavu and Goma. While they claimed to protect Tutsis, critics saw their actions as a cover for Rwandan influence. Meanwhile, Ugandan troops entered Bunia to curb ethnic violence.

On 21 February 2025, Rwanda's government expressed solidarity with General James Kabarebe, who was sanctioned by the U.S. over his alleged role in the violence in eastern Congo. Rwanda rejected the sanctions as “unjustified and unfounded” emphasizing that border security with Congo was a national priority. Despite Rwanda's denials, the U.S. and UN have linked Rwanda to M23's actions, urging dialogue between Congo and the rebels. However, Congo's President Tshisekedi has refused talks, seeing M23 as a proxy of Rwanda.

On 25 February 2025, the UK announced to suspend bilateral aid to Rwanda and impose sanctions on Kigali due to its involvement in Congo conflict.

==== March 2025 ====
On 1 March 2025, the Congo River Alliance and M23 formally turned over to Rwandan custody several alleged FDLR militia fighters at the border along Rwanda's Rubavu District. The Rwandan Ministry of Defense claimed that captured FDLR members had worked closely with the Congolese military (FARDC) and other government forces. A spokesman for the FARDC said that this was a "setup" to discredit the FARDC and an attempt to justify the invasion of the Congo, using former FDLR members from Rwandan prisons and dressing them in captured Congolese uniforms. He also accused Rwanda of being responsible for war crimes in Goma and for having previously ordered an FDLR commander to attack Congolese.

On 9 March 2025, the M23 fully captured Goma and Bukavu, pushing deeper into the mineral-rich DRC. The DRC offered USD$5,000,000 for M23 leaders’ arrest AND USD$4,000,000 for accomplices.

On 18 March 2025, Presidents Félix Tshisekedi of the Democratic Republic of the Congo (DRC) and Paul Kagame of Rwanda met in Doha, Qatar, to discuss the ongoing conflict in eastern DRC. The leaders, alongside Qatar's Emir Sheikh Tamim bin Hamad Al Thani, called for an "immediate and unconditional ceasefire" in the region. Despite this, M23 rebels, supported by Rwanda, seized the town of Walikale on 20 March 2025, pushing further into DRC's interior. M23 leaders rejected the ceasefire, citing unresolved issues.

==== June 2025 ====
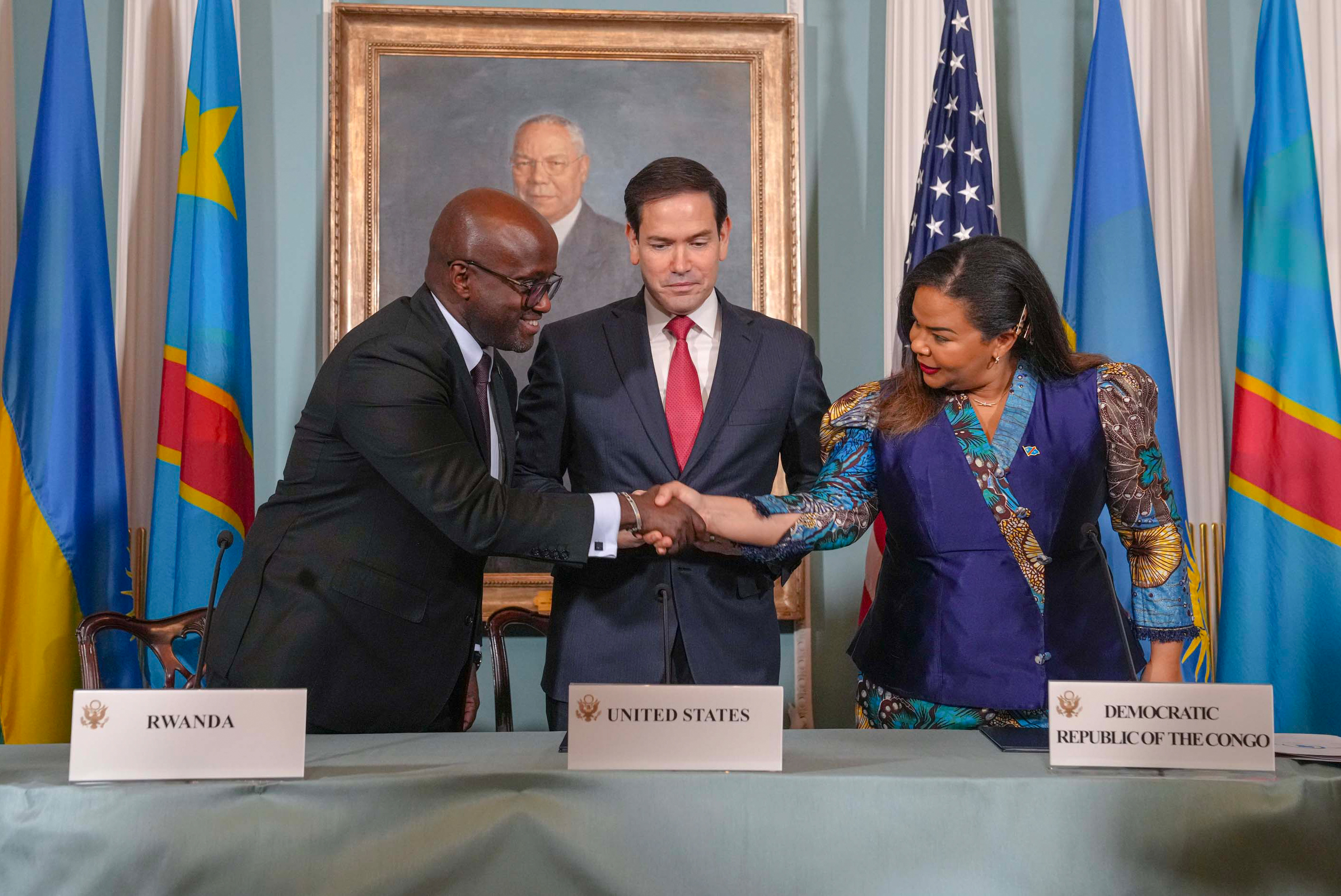
Signing ceremony for the peace agreement, Washington, D.C., 27 June 2025.

A preliminary peace deal was reached on 19 June 2025 between Congolese and Rwandan delegations following three days of talks in Washington, D.C., brokered by the second Trump administration. President Tshisekedi had invited President Donald Trump to participate in mediating the conflict. The talks did not involve M23, and reportedly had terms that included the withdrawal of Rwandan troops from the DRC and some Congolese minerals mined on a small scale to be exported through Rwanda. The U.S. indicated it would invest in the DRC's mining industry. The signing of the final deal was scheduled for 27 June. On 26 June it was reported that the DRC dropped its demand for an immediate Rwandan troop withdrawal. An M23 spokesman said that the deal does not concern the group.

A peace agreement was signed on 27 June by the foreign ministers of Rwanda and the DRC, Olivier Nduhungirehe and Thérèse Kayikwamba Wagner, in the presence of U.S. secretary of state Marco Rubio. A signing ceremony was also held later that day in the White House, with President Trump. The agreement pledges to create a joint security cooperation mechanism between the two countries within a month, to monitor the withdrawal of Rwandan troops from the DR Congo within 90 days, and the DRC pledged to end its support for the FDLR. Rwanda and the DRC also agreed to create regional economic integration framework within a month to "expand foreign trade and investment derived from regional critical mineral supply chains".

==== December 2025 ====
On 4 December 2025, U.S. President Donald Trump hosted Rwandan President Paul Kagame and Democratic Republic of Congo President Félix Tshisekedi in Washington to ratify the peace agreement. The leaders reaffirmed their commitments to the U.S.-brokered peace deal reached in June, 2025.

On 5 December 2025, only one day after the latest peace agreement was signed, fighting resumed between the Congolese military and the M23.

On 6 December, the Congolese military spokesman accused Rwanda and the M23 of launching artillery attacks on targets in South Kivu, including civilian areas. Rwanda denied the allegation on 7 December.

On 8 December, Tshisekedi publicly accused Rwanda of violating the peace agreement. On the same day, Burundian Foreign Minister Édouard Bizimana alleged that 8,000 Rwandan troops are present in South Kivu. Thousands of people, including civilian refugees, FARDC and pro-government Wazalendo militiamen, and Burundian FDNB troops retreated as M23/AFC forces captured the town of Sange in the Uvira Territory, as part of the offensive towards Uvira. They fled into neighboring areas or crossed the border into Burundi. The FDNB chief of staff, General Prime Niyongabo, reportedly made the decision for the remaining Burundian troops in the DRC to withdraw back into their country.

=== 2026 ===
==== February 2026 ====
Willy Ngoma, the military spokesperson for the M23 rebel movement, was killed in a drone strike near Rubaya in North Kivu. Reuters reported the death on 24 February 2026, citing Congolese officials and local sources who attributed the strike to Congolese forces; the M23 had not issued an immediate public confirmation in those initial reports.

==== March 2026 ====
The United States imposed sanctions over what it described as Rwanda's support for M23, which Rwanda continues to deny despite extensive evidence to the contrary. DR Congo and Rwanda agreed in US-hosted talks to take coordinated steps to reduce tensions, including mutual respect for sovereignty, a Rwandan withdrawal from specified areas, and renewed Congolese action against the FDLR.

== See also ==
- Kivu conflict
- First Congo War
- Second Congo War
- M23 rebellion
- M23 offensive (2022–present)
- Elections in the Democratic Republic of the Congo
- Elections in Rwanda
- Democracy in Africa
- Democratic Republic of the Congo–Rwanda border
- Democratic Republic of the Congo–Rwanda relations

== Sources ==
- Reyntjens, Filip (2009). The Great African War: Congo and Regional Geopolitics, 1996–2006. Cambridge: Cambridge University Press. ISBN 978-0-521-11128-7.
