= United Nations Security Council Resolution 2773 =

UN Security Council Resolution 2773
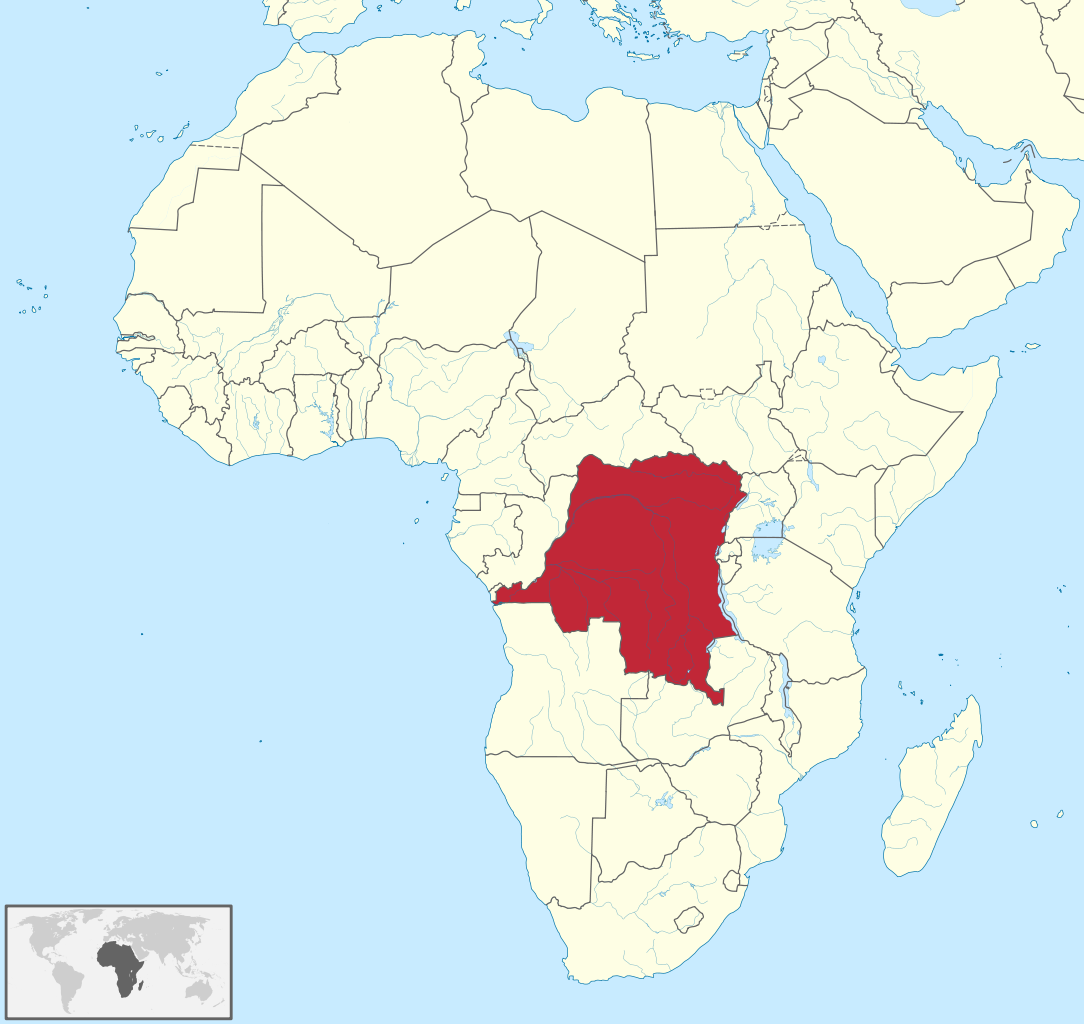
- Map of the Democratic Republic of the Congo
- Date: 21 February 2025
- Meeting no.: 9,865
- Code: S/RES/2773 (Document)
- Subject: The situation concerning the Democratic Republic of the Congo
- Voting summary: 15 voted for; None voted against; None abstained
- Result: Adopted

Security Council composition
- Permanent members: China; France; Russia; United Kingdom; United States
- Non-permanent members: Algeria; Denmark; Greece; Guyana; South Korea; Pakistan; Panama; Sierra Leone; Slovenia; Somalia

United Nations Security Council Resolution 2773 was unanimously passed on 21 February 2025. It reaffirmed the commitment of the council to the sovereignty and territorial integrity of the Democratic Republic of the Congo (DRC) in light of the support by Rwanda for the military campaign by the rebel March 23 Movement (M23).

== Resolution ==
The resolution called on M23 to stop all of its offensives and to reverse the creation of parallel state institutions in the DRC, while Rwanda was called on to end all support for M23 and to withdraw its troops from the DRC immediately. The DRC was asked to end its support for certain militia groups, specifically the Democratic Forces for the Liberation of Rwanda (FDLR), and both governments were urged to resume the peace negotiations that were previously held in Luanda, Angola, and Nairobi, Kenya.

The French permanent representative to the United Nations, Nicolas de Rivière, thanked the council for the resolution and expressed the support of France for the peace process to resolve the conflict and for the sovereignty of the DRC. He emphasized the humanitarian impact of the Kivu conflict on the population.

On 11 March, the UN special envoy for the Great Lakes region, Xia Huang, met with DRC president Félix Tshisekedi to discuss the security situation and the implementation of Resolution 2773.

On 12 December, DRC Foreign Minister Thérèse Kayikwamba Wagner addressed the Security Council and denounced the lack of action by its members nine months after the adoption of Resolution 2773.

== See also ==
- List of United Nations Security Council Resolutions 2701 to 2800 (2023–2025)
