= 2025 DRC–Rwanda peace agreement =

Peace deal facilitated by the United States in 2025

Democratic Republic of the Congo–Rwanda peace agreement
Peace Agreement Between the Democratic Republic of the Congo and the Republic of Rwanda
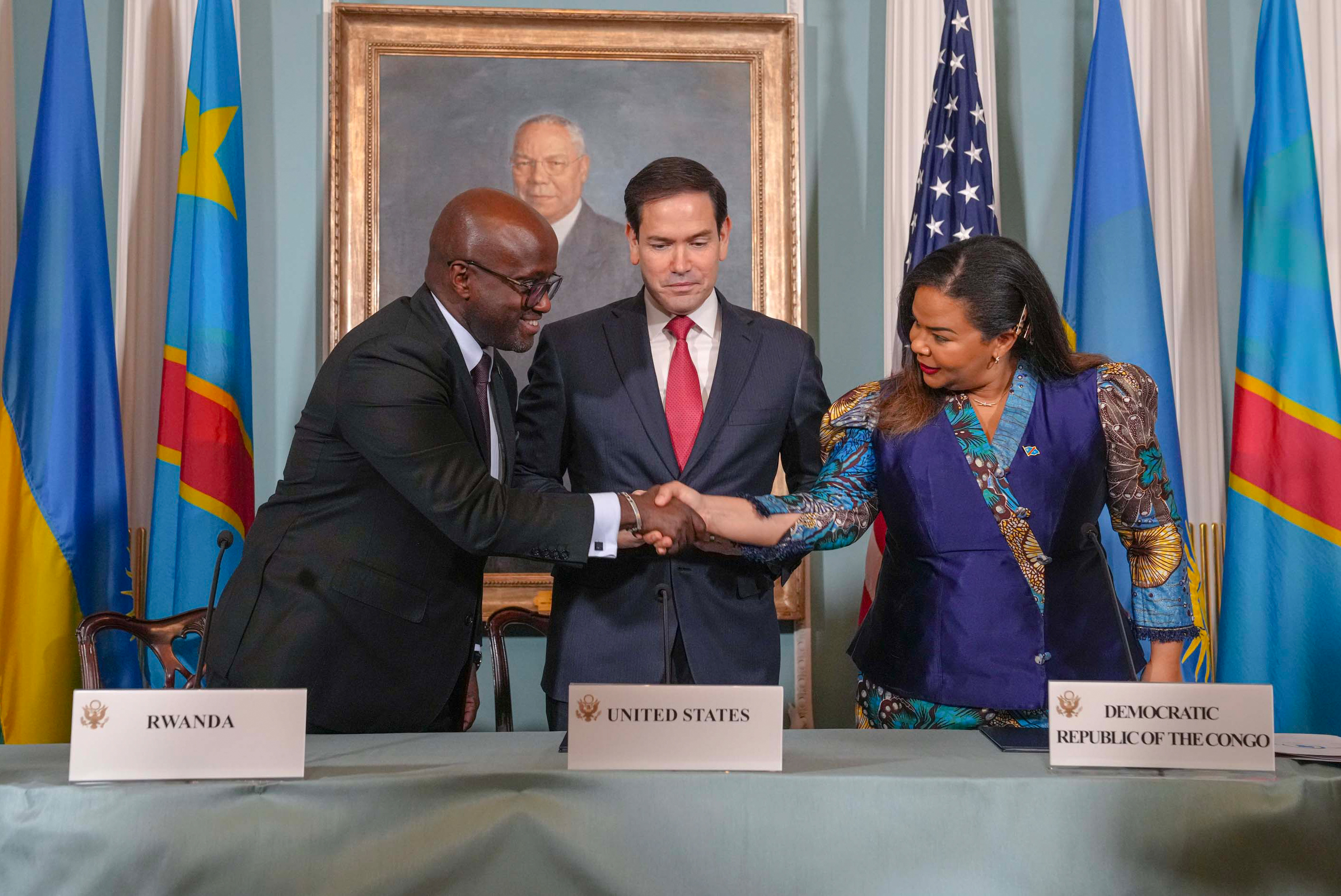
- Type: Peace treaty
- Context: Democratic Republic of the Congo–Rwanda conflict
- Signed: June 27, 2025
- Location: Washington, D.C., U.S.
- Effective: June 27, 2025
- Mediators: Donald Trump; Marco Rubio; Massad Boulos; Tamim bin Hamad Al Thani
- Negotiators: Félix Tshisekedi; Thérèse Kayikwamba Wagner; Paul Kagame; Olivier Nduhungirehe
- Parties: DR Congo; Rwanda
- Language: English and French

The Democratic Republic of the Congo–Rwanda peace agreement, officially the Washington Accords for Peace and Prosperity, is a peace treaty intended to end the conflict between the Democratic Republic of the Congo (DRC) and Rwanda, signed on June 27, 2025, in Washington, D.C., United States. The main points of the agreement call for the withdrawal of Rwandan troops from the eastern DRC and for the Congolese government to end its support for the Democratic Forces for the Liberation of Rwanda (FDLR) militia. It also aims to set up a regional economic integration framework between the two countries based on the critical minerals trade, which will involve the United States.

The Washington Peace Accords went into effect after being signed by the foreign ministers of the DRC and Rwanda, Thérèse Kayikwamba Wagner and Olivier Nduhungirehe, following negotiations between the two countries that were mediated by the U.S. and Qatar. The ceremony was overseen by U.S. Secretary of State Marco Rubio. The main Rwandan-backed rebel group in the eastern DRC, the March 23 Movement (M23), was not a party to the agreement, and was in separate negotiations with the Congolese government taking place in Doha, Qatar.

As of mid-September, the implementation of the agreement had stalled. Rwandan troops had not withdrawn from the DRC, the FDLR had not been disbanded, and the talks between M23 and the Congolese government did not lead to a peace deal. Although the DRC had signed a ceasefire and a declaration of principles with M23, it was followed by repeated violations and both sides accusing each other of breaking the ceasefire. A deadline in late August to sign a final peace deal with M23 was missed. The economic section of the Washington Peace Accords was also delayed.

The Doha talks between the DRC and M23 and the Washington talks between the DRC and Rwanda continued for several months. On November 7, delegations from the DRC and Rwanda signed the Regional Economic Integration Framework in Washington. On November 15, the DRC and M23 signed a framework agreement to end their conflict through further negotiations. The heads of state, Félix Tshisekedi of the DRC and Paul Kagame of Rwanda, signed the Washington Peace Accords on December 4, 2025, in a ceremony presided over by U.S. president Donald Trump and involving several other African leaders. However, fighting still continues in the eastern DRC despite the treaty, and it has been criticized by analysts as primarily serving U.S. economic interests instead of resolving the historic conflict.

== Background ==
The eastern Democratic Republic of the Congo (DRC) has been unstable since the influx of refugees from the Rwandan Civil War during the 1990s, leading to multiple conflicts over the next three decades involving more than 100 armed groups, some of which have been supported by the government of Rwanda. Rwanda has justified its involvement by claiming that some of the Hutu factions responsible for the Rwandan genocide against Tutsis continue to be active in the eastern DRC and have received support from its government—particularly the Democratic Forces for the Liberation of Rwanda (FDLR). However, Rwanda has been accused by the United Nations and the Congolese government of using this as a pretext to steal resources from the mineral-rich eastern DRC. The conflicts in this region have caused the deaths of several million Congolese and the displacement of over seven million as refugees, with the UN describing the situation as "one of the most protracted, complex, serious humanitarian crises on Earth".

The current conflict began in 2022 with the resurgence of the March 23 Movement (M23) rebel group in the eastern DRC, following several years of dormancy since the M23 rebellion in 2012–2013. It received extensive military support from Rwanda, although the Rwandan government denies this. In early 2025, M23 captured a large territory in the east, including the major cities of Goma and Bukavu, the provincial capitals of North and South Kivu. The offensive has been described as the biggest escalation since M23 briefly occupied Goma in 2012 and has led to the conflict being compared to the First and Second Congo Wars of the 1990s and early 2000s. According to the UN, as of late 2024, the Rwandan Defence Force (RDF) deployed as many as 4,000 troops to assist M23 in its campaign against the Congolese government, and has de facto control over M23 operations. The Congo River Alliance (AFC), a political organization that M23 joined in 2023, claimed that its goal was to overthrow the Congolese government. The M23 resurgence has become the largest Rwandan-backed rebellion in the DRC since the Second Congo War.

== Negotiating process ==
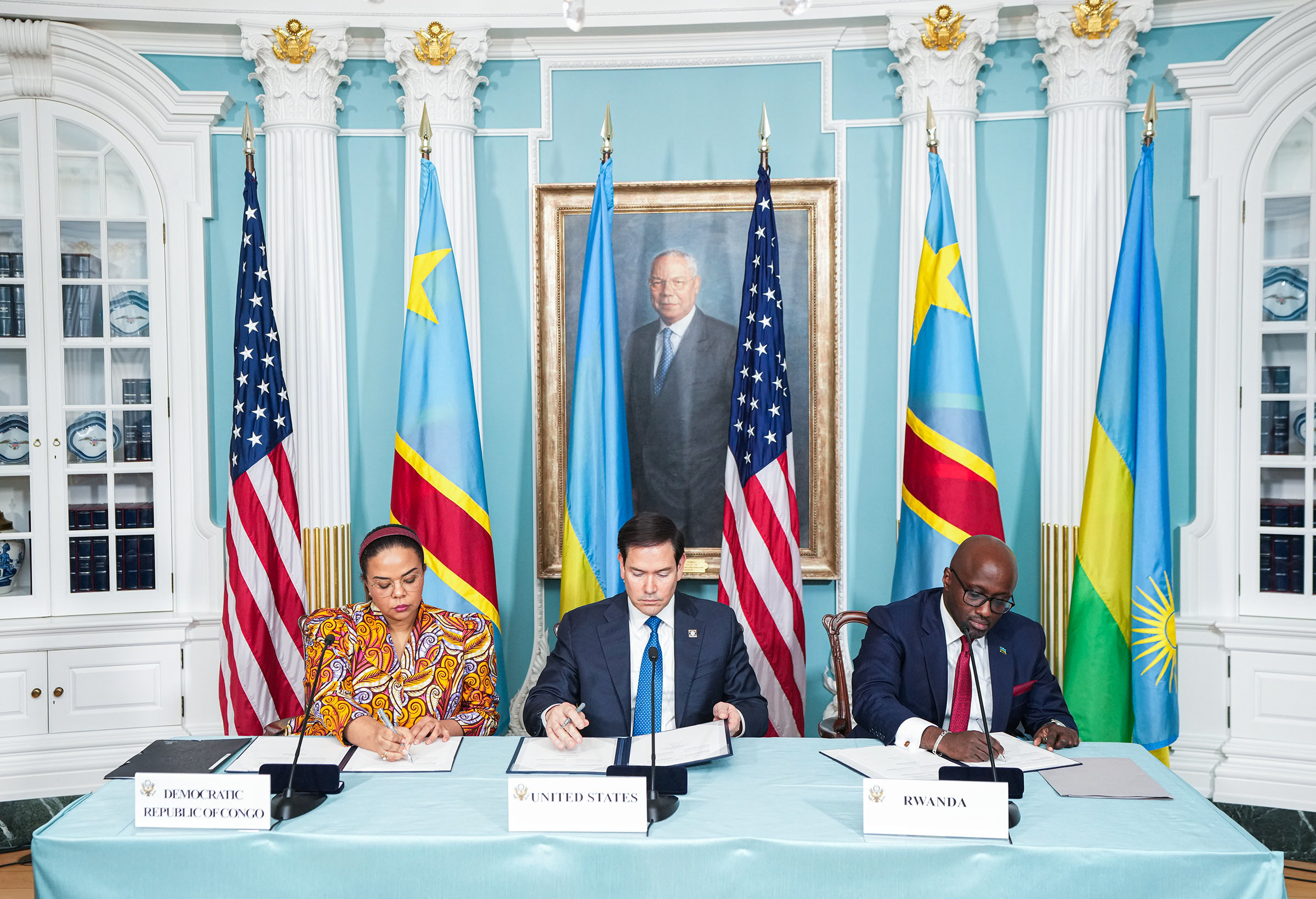
Secretary Marco Rubio hosts a Declaration of Principles signing ceremony between DRC Foreign Minister Thérèse Kayikwamba Wagner and Rwandan Foreign Minister Olivier Nduhungirehe, April 25, 2025.

There were previous efforts to mediate peace talks by Kenya and Angola that did not lead to a lasting agreement. In February 2025, President Félix Tshisekedi of the DRC sent a letter to President Donald Trump, offering the U.S. access to his country's critical minerals in exchange for security assistance. In March, he made a formal offer of this to President Trump. Also that month, Massad Boulos, a businessman who served as an advisor for the Middle East on the second Trump administration transition team, was appointed to the U.S. State Department for the purpose of mediating an agreement to end the conflict in the DRC. After taking office, U.S. Secretary of State Marco Rubio spoke with both Tshisekedi and President Paul Kagame of Rwanda, encouraging an "immediate ceasefire".

Tshisekedi met with Kagame in Qatar for talks hosted by the emir, Tamim bin Hamad Al Thani, on March 18, the first in-person meeting between the two heads of state since the escalation of the conflict. Tshisekedi and Kagame called for an immediate ceasefire after their meeting, but this was rejected by the M23 leadership. The U.S. took a bigger role in the talks after the meeting in Doha, Qatar, and it was also the start of negotiations between the DRC and M23. The U.S. and Qatar worked closely throughout the negotiating process after the March 18 meeting, with a Qatari minister saying that it is part of his country's intention to mediate conflicts around the world. In early April Boulos visited and met with officials in the DRC, Rwanda, Kenya, and Uganda, and during his tour he discussed resolving the DRC conflict and potential U.S. investment in the region. He emphasized that the U.S. believes Rwanda must withdraw its troops from DR Congo and end its support for M23. After further Qatari-mediated talks, the Congolese government and M23 agreed to a ceasefire on April 24. The government had previously refused to negotiate with M23, labeling it a terrorist group.

The negotiations continued on April 25 with a meeting of the Congolese and Rwandan foreign ministers, Thérèse Kayikwamba Wagner and Olivier Nduhungirehe, in Washington, D.C., where Secretary of State Rubio was also present. A "declaration of principles" for a peace settlement was agreed on. The declaration called for respecting territorial integrity as well as addressing legitimate security concerns, and also called on the two countries to cooperate with the U.S. and U.S. investors on economic projects, including in critical minerals. A preliminary peace deal was signed by the DRC and Rwanda in Washington on June 19, 2025, after additional talks. Among its main points were ending hostilities and respecting territorial integrity, disarming non-state groups, facilitating the return of refugees, and a regional economic integration network. The signing ceremony was set for June 27. Reportedly, a demand from the DRC on immediate Rwandan troop withdrawal had been dropped during the talks. The U.S. also insisted on a withdrawal before the signing, but dropped it after Rwanda resisted. The signing took place with their foreign ministers, Thérèse Kayikwamba Wagner and Olivier Nduhungirehe, in the presence of the U.S. Secretary of State, on June 27, and it was followed by a meeting with President Trump at the White House.

== Terms ==
The peace agreement pledges to implement the terms of a 2024 deal which calls for Rwanda to withdraw its troops from the DRC and for the two countries to establish a regional economic integration framework within 90 days, the creation of a joint security coordination mechanism within 30 days, and the "disengagement, disarmament, and conditional integration of non-state armed groups", which would end support for the FDLR and M23. The deal also seeks to "link both countries, in partnership, as appropriate, with the U.S. government and U.S. investors" through the economic framework. The joint security coordination mechanism would oversee both the Rwandan troop withdrawal and the disbandment of the FDLR.

== Implementation ==
=== 2025 ===
The heads of state of the DRC and Rwanda were expected to visit Washington in July to finalize the agreement, which has been officially named the Washington Accord. Massad Boulos later said that the U.S. hopes for the DRC and M23 to also sign a peace agreement before the signing of the Washington Accord by the countries' heads of state. The Rwandan cabinet and Kagame ratified the agreement on July 16. On July 19 the DRC signed a declaration of principles with M23 and the larger rebel political coalition, the AFC, in Doha, Qatar, which stated that a final peace agreement and full ceasefire will be signed no later than August 18, and that it will be in alignment with the agreement between the DRC and Rwanda. Congolese government spokesman Patrick Muyaya stated that the declaration "takes into account the red lines we have always defended, including the withdrawal of M23." The principles include the restoration of state authority over the entire territory of the DRC. A draft peace agreement was released by Qatar as early as August 12, but both sides criticized it and accused each other of violating the ceasefire, with several instances of fighting between M23 and the Armed Forces of the Democratic Republic of the Congo (FARDC) in the following days.

Meetings were organized by the U.S. State Department from July 30 to August 1 between delegations from Rwanda, the DRC, and the mediators, to oversee the implementation of the economic and security aspects of the agreement. A meeting of the Joint Oversight Committee took place on September 4, which "acknowledged slowness" in the implementation of the terms. As of mid-September 2025, both the M23 and Rwanda peace negotiations had stalled. Rwandan troops remained in Congolese territory and talks between M23 and the Congolese government were at an impasse. A draft of the economic framework was completed by September 14, but the DRC stated that no economic cooperation with Rwanda was possible until its troops were withdrawn from Congolese territory. In an outline of the economic framework that was reached in August, the DRC and Rwanda affirmed that each country has "full, sovereign control" over the natural resources in its territory and their processing. They also both committed to ensuring that revenue from the mineral trade was not used to fund armed groups, to work to develop a world-class mining industry, and to increase cross-border cooperation on mineral supply chains.

A meeting of the Joint Security Coordination Mechanism took place on September 17–18, leading to an agreement that Congolese military operations against FDLR would begin on October 1 and that a Rwandan troop withdrawal would take place from October 21–31. A meeting of the Joint Oversight Committee took place on October 1, where the details of the security arrangements were finalized, and another round of talks between the Congolese government and M23 was agreed to.

On October 10, the FARDC official spokesman called on all FDLR militants to surrender to the Congolese government in accordance with the agreement, and threatened that there would be military operations against those that did not surrender. On October 14, a new ceasefire monitoring organization was established after Qatari-mediated talks in Doha between M23 and the DRC. It includes delegations from both of them along with U.S., Qatari, and African Union representatives, and was described as a "critical step" by Massad Boulos. Despite this, on October 20, the group launched a new offensive against the pro-government Wazalendo militia in North Kivu, ending the ceasefire that had been in place since August. The FARDC flew in reinforcements by helicopter as militia forces launched a counterattack. Angola accused M23 of violating the ceasefire that had been reached and called for it to be restored. M23 described its actions as "self-defense" against the Congolese government forces. The DRC refused to take part in a formal signing ceremony for the peace agreement involving the heads of state on October 23, which had been proposed by U.S. envoy Boulos, because of ongoing hostilities with M23. Another meeting of the Joint Security Coordination Mechanism took place on October 21–22.

On November 2, Félix Tshisekedi said that the ratification of the peace agreement will take place in a signing ceremony with him and Kagame in Washington after the DRC reaches an agreement with M23. It was also reported that the Congolese government has almost finished negotiations in Qatar towards a peace deal with M23, which will consist of five pillars for peace and specific terms for implementation and monitoring. Boulos described the M23 deal as the "last piece of the puzzle" for the U.S.-mediated peace agreement. The signing ceremony between Tshisekedi and Kagame is reportedly planned for November 13, and will include both the Washington Accord with Rwanda and the Doha agreement with M23, the latter based on the declaration of principles signed in July. However, it was reported later that week that the negotiations were making minimal progress due to disagreement over the return of state authority, with M23 wanting a gradual restoration under a national unity government, while the Congolese government wanted M23 to withdraw unconditionally. M23 also continued establishing parallel state institutions in the territory under its control. M23 reportedly wanted power-sharing in Congolese government institutions and autonomy for the eastern DRC.

On November 5, the FARDC began a campaign in North Kivu to get FDLR members to surrender themselves to the government. The army broadcast messages with megaphones and on local radio stations, and dropped leaflets from aircraft. Also on that day, the first meeting of the DRC–M23 ceasefire verification mechanism was held, though on November 8 the DRC accused the group of breaking the ceasefire. On November 7, technical delegations from the DRC and Rwanda reached an agreement on the Regional Economic Integration Framework in Washington, as part of the larger peace agreement. The framework covers energy, infrastructure, mining, national parks, tourism, and public health. However, it depends on the implementation of the security aspects of the DRC–Rwanda peace agreement. Tshisekedi said that the U.S. will soon invite him and Kagame to Washington for the signing ceremony of the agreement. The Joint Oversight Committee also met in Washington on November 7 and agreed on near-term actions to be taken to accelerate the disbanding of the FDLR and the withdrawal of Rwandan troops, including preparations for a joint military operation against the FDLR.

The Congolese government missed a deadline to sign a peace agreement with M23 in Doha on November 11, and the ratification of the DRC–Rwanda agreement was also delayed from its original date, being pushed to November 21. Qatar was unable to resolve the differences between the DRC and M23 on key issues. Meanwhile, the FDLR refused to surrender or disarm in a statement on November 11. A framework agreement between the DRC and M23, which commits the signatories to ending the war through further negotiations on eight key pillars, was signed in Doha on November 15. Another agreement will be signed after the final terms on all eight pillars are settled. A meeting of the Joint Security Coordination Mechanism took place on November 19–20 in Washington, where the DRC and Rwanda reviewed progress on the military plan against the FDLR and the withdrawal of Rwandan troops. The ratification of the peace deal was pushed back to December 4. On December 2–3, M23 launched multiple attacks against government forces in South Kivu, targeting FARDC, Wazalendo, and Burundi National Defense Force (FDNB) troops. Fighting also took place in North Kivu as the government forces attacked M23 positions. Both sides accused each other of violating the ceasefire.

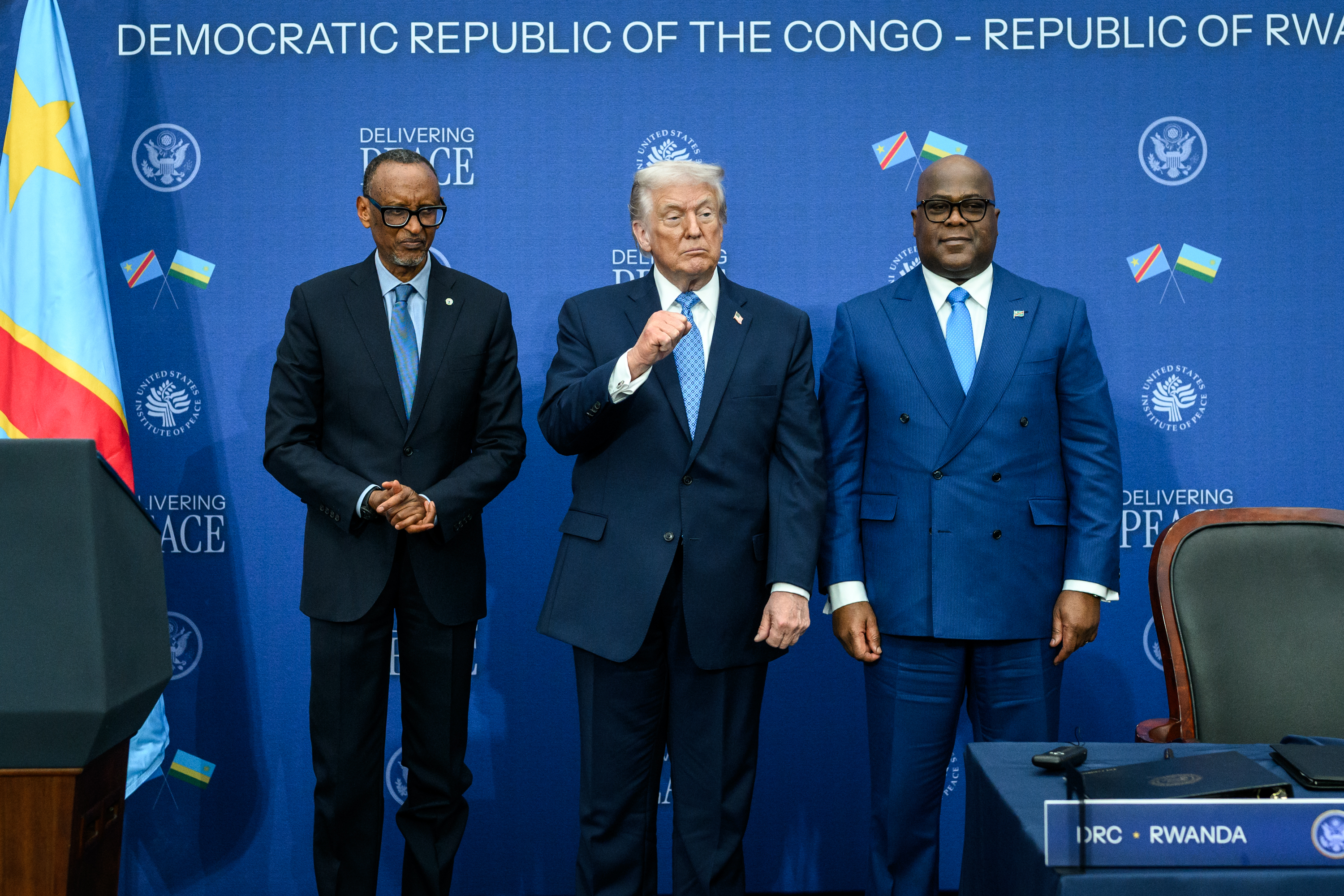

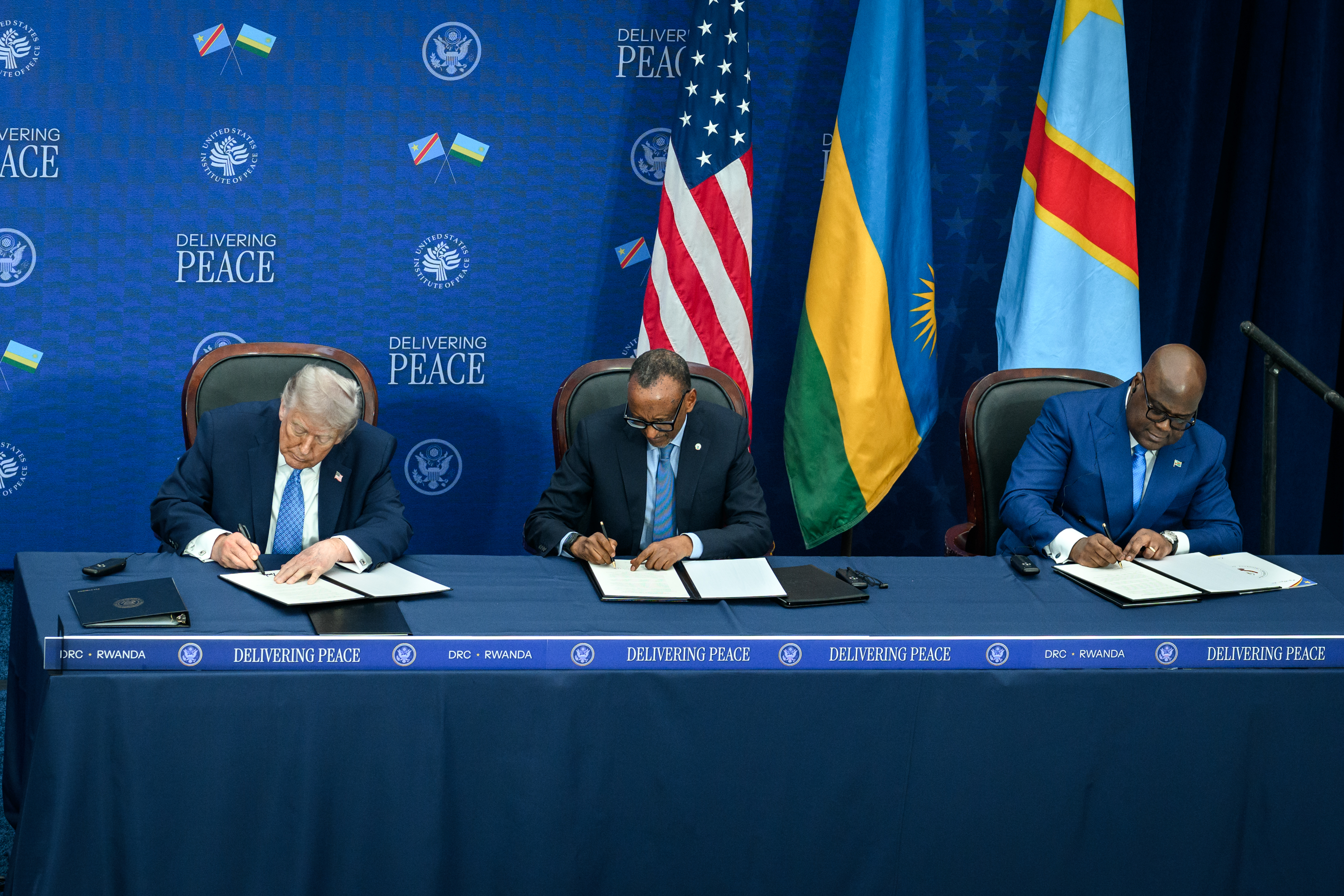
The signing of the Washington Accords by presidents Donald Trump, Paul Kagame, and Félix Tshisekedi, December 4, 2025.

The ceremony for the signing of the agreement by the heads of state, Tshisekedi and Kagame, was held in Washington at the United States Institute of Peace, in the presence of Donald Trump, on December 4. Also in attendance were presidents William Ruto of Kenya, João Lourenço of Angola, Évariste Ndayishimiye of Burundi, Faure Gnassingbé of Togo, and Vice President Jessica Alupo of Uganda; along with Marco Rubio and the foreign ministers of Qatar and the United Arab Emirates. The signed Washington Accords for Peace and Prosperity consist of the peace agreement from June 27, the Regional Economic Integration Framework from November 7, the declaration of principles from April 25, and separate bilateral agreements with the United States for the DRC and Rwanda. The latter includes a memorandum of understanding on security and an economic deal with the DRC, and an economic deal with Rwanda. On December 6, FARDC spokesman Major General Sylvian Ekenge accused M23 and the Rwandan Defense Force of increasing their artillery strikes on targets in South Kivu, which he also called "Kigali's determination to sabotage any peace process". Rwandan Foreign Minister Nduhungirehe denied the allegation and said that it was "ridiculous" on December 7. The next day, Tshisekedi accused Rwanda of violating its commitments, which was denied by Nduhungirehe.

After a rapid offensive towards Uvira in early December, M23 announced its capture of the last major settlement in South Kivu on December 10, despite the peace deal and ceasefire. The DRC and Burundian foreign ministers, Therese Kayikwamba Wagner and Edouard Bizimana, called on the U.S. to sanction Rwanda for not implementing the agreement. Rwanda accused the Congolese and Burundian armies of violating the ceasefire by launching attacks.

=== 2026 ===
After pressure from the U.S. starting from mid-December 2025, M23 leader Corneille Nangaa announced that the group withdrew all of its fighters from Uvira on January 17, 2026. On the same day, the African Union mediator in the peace talks, Togolese president Faure Gnassingbé, hosted a conference in Lomé, Togo, of the five AU co-facilitators, several foreign ministers, and other officials. The Lomé conference focused on consolidating the mediation efforts of the peace process. The final communique from the conference urged the continuation of the Washington process and the relaunching of Qatari-mediated talks on the unresolved six pillars of the DRC–M23 agreement. On January 31, M23 launched a drone attack on the Kisangani international airport, in the central DRC province of Tshopo, allegedly on an FARDC drone command center. Nangaa alleged that Kisangani is the "primary hub" for Congolese military operations into M23-occupied territory. On February 2, a meeting took place in Qatar where the DRC government and M23 signed a ceasefire verification terms of reference agreement. It was reported that an on-the-ground monitoring team will be deployed to the Uvira area within 30 days.

The U.S. Treasury Department imposed sanctions on the Rwandan military and four commanders on March 2 for violating the agreement, with Treasury Secretary Scott Bessent stating that the U.S. expects "the immediate withdrawal of Rwanda Defence Force troops, weapons, and equipment" from the DRC. The department also stated that the success of M23 would have been impossible without advanced equipment from the RDF, including "GPS jamming systems, air defense equipment, drones, and additional materiel." On March 7, the prime minister of the DRC, Judith Suminwa, introduced two bills to the parliament to ratify the Washington Peace Accords and the U.S. strategic partnership agreement. A meeting of envoys from the DRC and Rwanda took place in Washington on March 17 and 18, during which the U.S. pressured both sides to implement their commitments on the withdrawal of Rwandan troops and the neutralization of the FDLR before the end of 2026. During a UN Security Council meeting on March 26, Massad Boulos called for the immediate withdrawal of Rwandan forces from the DRC and for the FARDC to begin operations against the FDLR. On March 29, the FARDC announced that the operations will begin soon, and it also became known that the Doha peace talks will be relocated from Qatar to Switzerland due to the U.S. and Israeli war against Iran.

Although French-trained FARDC special forces battalions were deployed to North Kivu in late March ahead of a potential operation against the FDLR, no action was taken, and cooperation has continued between the FDLR and elements of the FARDC. On July 28, the DRC announced a new plan for the FDLR to voluntarily disarm in exchange for political concessions from Rwanda, but it was rejected by the Rwandan government. The Congolese government has attempted to portray the plan as fulfilling its obligations under the Washington Peace Accords, while continuing to integrate FDLR fighters into auxiliary forces such as the Wazalendo militia. On October 12, former Congolese president Joseph Kabila joined the AFC–M23 coalition, announcing the launch of the Front for the Refoundation of the Nation (FRN), which replaced the AFC and likely has the backing of several other African states.

== Analysis and reactions ==
M23 and the political organization it is part of, the AFC, have said in the past that any agreement negotiated without their involvement does not concern the group. Separate negotiations are still ongoing between the Congolese government and M23. Congolese Foreign Minister Thérèse Kayikwamba Wagner said that the two negotiating tracks are "closely linked", and that the peace process had been given a new "sense of urgency" due to the commitment of U.S. President Trump. Rwandan Foreign Minister Olivier Nduhungirehe claimed that the treaty would not have been possible without Trump's leadership and called it a "remarkable milestone." The U.S. senior advisor for Africa, Massad Boulos, called it a "historic agreement" because "there was never a comprehensive agreement like this particular one." According to the U.S. State Department, the U.S., Qatar, the African Union, and Togo "will continue to engage both parties to ensure implementation of the obligations laid out in the agreement." The African Union named Faure Gnassingbé, the president of Togo, as its chief mediator for the conflict, along with a panel of five other former presidents, who contributed to the Doha and Washington peace talks.

UN Secretary-General Antonio Guterres said that that the agreement is "a significant step towards de-escalation, peace and stability in the eastern Democratic Republic of the Congo and the Great Lakes region". He commended the U.S. for its leadership role in the mediation, and acknowledged the roles of Qatar, the African Union, and other organizations that were involved, and called on all parties to honor the agreement and UNSC Resolution 2773. A statement from the Democratic U.S. senators Chris Coons and Jeanne Shaheen said that "While signing an agreement is important, implementation will be essential, and we urge both parties and all international partners to ensure its enforcement."

The agreement has been criticized by some experts and commentators for not involving the M23 group and for its economic section, which has been called resource exploitation. It was also noted that the agreement refers to the FDLR far more than M23. The former president of the DRC, Joseph Kabila, criticized the agreement with Rwanda as "diplomatic theater" due to the absence of M23 and other groups from eastern Congo. Political researcher Jason Stearns said that "This is the best chance we have at a peace process for the moment despite all the challenges and flaws". Jakob Kerstan, the DRC country director at the Konrad Adenauer Foundation, said that the agreement is a political gain for Tshisekedi, by bringing the U.S. into the negotiating process to assist his country. Financial Times wrote that the agreement effectively commits Rwanda to ending its support for M23. Other commentators have noted that M23 still has significant leverage due to its control of Goma and Bukavu, regardless of Rwandan support. Ten Congolese opposition parties, including those of Joseph Kabila and the former presidential candidate Moïse Katumbi, criticized the agreement in a statement on July 11, 2025, saying that it reduced the situation to a "bilateral conflict" with Rwanda.

As of November 2025, Congolese civil rights activists have described the deal as one where neither side is sincere in following its commitments. Rwanda has refused to withdraw its troops until the FDLR has been neutralized, while the DRC insists that both must happen at the same time, and the ceasefire with M23 has been violated by both sides. They also noted that many FDLR members are located in areas under M23 control, where the Congolese government cannot reach them, and that Rwanda benefits from keeping the group alive, to continue occupying the eastern DRC. Kagame accused the DRC of not fulfilling its commitments on November 27, but expressed hope that the peace agreement could be ratified in the next month by him and Tshisekedi.

Trump praised the deal as "historic" after signing of the accords in Washington by Tshisekedi and Kagame on December 4, 2025. Nduhungirehe later again denied that Rwanda has troops in the DRC. Wagner defended the Congolese government signing the agreement, saying that it brings the DRC closer to peace and stability. Analysts have pointed out that fighting is continuing and criticized the deal as primarily serving U.S. geopolitical and economic interests, opening up mines to U.S. access, including those controlled by M23. The U.S. efforts have also been described as too little to pressure either Rwanda or the DRC to make the compromises necessary to stop the conflict.

== See also ==
- Pretoria Accord
