= Gong Yuanxing =

Chinese diplomat (born 1952)

- 龚元兴

Chinese Ambassador to Senegal
- In office November 2009 – August 2012
- Preceded by: Lu Shaye
- Succeeded by: Xia Huang

Chinese ambassador to Morocco
- In office December 2006 – May 2009
- Preceded by: Cheng Tao
- Succeeded by: Xu Jinghu

Chinese ambassador to Guinea
- In office August 2001 – January 2004
- Preceded by: Shi Tongning
- Succeeded by: Liu Yukun

Personal details
- Born: March 1952 (age 74) Shanghai, China
- Party: Chinese Communist Party
- Children: 1
- Education: Bordeaux Montaigne University; University of Sorbonne Nouvelle Paris 3 Sciences Po

Chinese name
- Traditional Chinese: 龔元興
- Simplified Chinese: 龚元兴
Transcriptions
Standard Mandarin
- Hanyu Pinyin: Gōng Yuánxīng

Gong Yuanxing (Chinese: 龚元兴; born March 1952) is a former Chinese diplomat.

== Biography ==
Gong was born in Shanghai in March 1952. After university, he was assigned to the Ministry of Foreign Affairs. From 1975 to 1979, he worked as a staff member at the Chinese Embassy in the Republic of Niger. Upon returning to China in 1979, he joined the Translation Office of the Ministry of Foreign Affairs. In 1983, Gong pursued advanced studies in France at Bordeaux Montaigne University, University of Sorbonne Nouvelle Paris 3, and Sciences Po. He returned to China in 1985 and continued working in the Translation Office. Gong served as a counsellor at the Chinese Embassy in the Republic of Chad from 1996 to 1997 and then at the Chinese Embassy in the Republic of Mali from 1997 to 2001. In 2001, he became the Chinese ambassador to Guinea, succeeding Shi Tongning. After returning to China in 2004, Gong briefly held the position of deputy director of the Foreign Affairs Office of Guangxi Zhuang Autonomous Region. He was then appointed as the Chinese ambassador to Morocco from 2005 to 2008. In 2009, Gong was named the Chinese ambassador to Senegal, taking over from Lu Shaye. He retired from the diplomatic service in August 2012.

Diplomatic posts
| Preceded by Shi Tongning (石同宁) | Chinese ambassador to Guinea; 2001–2004 | Succeeded by Liu Yukun (刘玉坤) |
| Preceded by Cheng Tao (程涛) | Chinese ambassador to Morocco; 2006–2009 | Succeeded by Xu Jinghu (许镜湖) |
| Preceded by Lu Shaye | Chinese Ambassador to Senegal; 2009–2012 | Succeeded by Xia Huang |
