= List of ambassadors of China to Morocco =

Coordinates: 33.979158°N 6.841002°W

Chinese Ambassador to Morocco
- Incumbent; Sun Shuzhong since July 2013
- Inaugural holder: Bai Ren
- Formation: February 1959; 67 years ago

The Chinese ambassador to Morocco is the official representative of the People's Republic of China to the Kingdom of Morocco.

== History ==
- In the Chinese consulate in Oujda, diplomatic relations with the National Liberation Front in Morocco were established.

== List of representatives ==
Diplomatic agrément/Diplomatic accreditation	Ambassador	Chinese language zh:中国驻摩洛哥大使列表	Observations	Premier of the People's Republic of China	List of rulers of Morocco	Term end
February 1959	Bai Ren	zh:白认		Zhou Enlai	Mohammed V of Morocco	December 1960
August 1961	Yang Qiliang	zh:杨琪良	(* 1914 - 2003): From August 1961 - January 1967 he was ambassador in Rabat, Morocco.; From July 1969 - May 1971 he was ambassador in Alger Algeria.; From August 1971 to August 1973 he was ambassador in Lagos Nigeria.; From August 1979 to December 1983 he was ambassador in Lisbon Portugal.	Zhou Enlai	Hassan II of Morocco	January 1967
February 1971	Zhang Weilie	zh:张伟烈	From September 1960 to November 1965 he was ambassador in Begdad Iraq.; From February 1971 to May 1974 he was ambassador in Rabat Morocco.; From October 1974 to April 1978 he was ambassador in Mongolia.; From July 1978 to June 1981 he was ambassador in Bangkok (Thailand).	Zhou Enlai	Hassan II of Morocco	May 1974
July 1974	Song Hanyi	zh:宋寒毅	From July 1974 to January 1979 he was ambassador in Rabat (Morocco).; From April 1979 to October 1984 he was ambassador in Khartoum (Sudan).	Zhou Enlai	Hassan II of Morocco	January 1979
May 1979	Mi Yong	zh:糜镛		Hua Guofeng	Hassan II of Morocco	May 1982
August 1982	Qin Jialin	zh:秦加林		Zhao Ziyang	Hassan II of Morocco	March 1983
August 1984	Wei Dong	zh:韦东	(*January 6, 1941 ): From August 1984 to July 1987 he was ambassador in Rabat (Morocco).; From June 1987 to January 1991 he was ambassador in Antananarivo (Madagascar).; From August 1994 to August 1998 he was ambassador in Lisbon Portugal.	Zhao Ziyang	Hassan II of Morocco	July 1987
March 1987	Wan Yongxiang	zh:完永祥		Li Peng	Hassan II of Morocco	January 1993
November 1992	An Guozheng	zh:安国政	From April 1985 to January 1990 he was ambassador in Kinshasa (Zaire).; From November 1992 to March 1997 he was ambassador in Rabat (Morocco)	Li Peng	Hassan II of Morocco	March 1997
December 1996	Mu Wen	zh:穆文		Li Peng	Hassan II of Morocco	April 2000
April 2000	Xiong Zhanqi	zh:熊展旗		Zhu Rongji	Mohammed VI of Morocco	April 2003
December 2002	Cheng Tao	zh:程涛	From August 1999 to August 2001 he was ambassador in Bamako (Mali).; From December 2002 to November 2006 he was ambassador in Rabat (Morocco).	Zhu Rongji	Mohammed VI of Morocco	November 2006
December 2006	Gong Yuanxing	zh:龚元兴	(March 1952 ): From August 2001 to January 2004 he was ambassador in Conakry (Guinea).; From December 2006 to May 2009 he was ambassador in Rabat (Morocco).; From November 2009 to August 2012 he was ambassador in Dakar (Senegal).	Wen Jiabao	Mohammed VI of Morocco	May 2009
June 2009	Xu Jinghu	zh:许镜湖	(October 1954 -): Since August 1616 he is Special Representative for African Affairs of the Chinese Government.; From July 2013 to March 2016 he was Ambassador in Bern (Switzerland). *From June 2009 to July 2013 he was Ambassador in Rabat Morocco. *From August 2001 to May 2004 he was Ambassador in Antananarivo Madagascar.	Wen Jiabao	Mohammed VI of Morocco	March 2013
July 2013	Sun Shuzhong	孙树忠		Li Keqiang	Mohammed VI of Morocco	
