= List of ambassadors of China to Senegal =

Coordinates: 14.693656°N 17.471598°W

Chinese Ambassador to Senegal
- Incumbent; Zhang Xun since October 2015
- Inaugural holder: Wang JinChuan
- Formation: July 1972; 54 years ago

The Chinese ambassador to Senegal is the official representative of the People's Republic of China to the Republic of Senegal.

== List of representatives ==
Diplomatic agrément/Diplomatic accreditation	Ambassador	Chinese language zh:中国驻塞内加尔大使列表	Observations	Premier of the People's Republic of China	President of Senegal	Term end
1960	Jiang Xilin	江锡麟	The governments in Taipei and Dakar established diplomatic relations. Senegal first established diplomatic ties with Taiwan in 1960, but these were severed in 1964.	Chen Cheng	Léopold Sédar Senghor	1964
November 5, 1966			The governments in Taipai and Dakar established diplomatic relations.	Chen Cheng	Léopold Sédar Senghor	
January 5, 1970	Tsiang Un-kai	蒋恩铠		Yen Chia-kan	Léopold Sédar Senghor	February 29, 1972
February 29, 1972			The governments in Beijing and Dakar established diplomatic relations.	Zhou Enlai	Léopold Sédar Senghor	
July 1972	Wang JinChuan	zh:王锦川	From July 1971 to August 1977 he was ambassador in Dakar (Senegal).; From December 1977 to January 1981 he was ambassador to Ethiopia.; From June 1981 to August 1982 he was ambassador in Mozambique.	Zhou Enlai	Léopold Sédar Senghor	August 1977
July 1978	Zong Kewen	zh:宗克文	(*1922): From June 1971 to March 1975 he was ambassador to Pargue Czechoslovakia.; From July 1975 to July 1978 he was ambassador to Sierra Leone.; From July 1978 to June 1982 he was ambassador in Senegal.; From August 1982 - August 1987 he was ambassador to North Korea	Hua Guofeng	Léopold Sédar Senghor	June 1982
December 12, 1983	Liang Feng	zh:梁枫	From December 1983 to December 1986 he was ambassador to Senegal and the Gambia.; From March 1988 to May 1991 he was ambassador in Laos.; From July 1991 to August 1994 he was ambassador in Myanmar.	Zhao Ziyang	Abdou Diouf	December 1986
February 1987	Xie Zhenliu	zh:谢振骝	Concurrently accredited to Senegal, Cape Verde and The Gambia.	Li Peng	Abdou Diouf	February 1991
May 1991	Cang Youheng	zh:仓友衡		Li Peng	Abdou Diouf	December 1995
January 1996			The governments in Taipai and Dakar established diplomatic relations.	Lien Chan	Abdou Diouf	
January 1996	Tou Chou-seng	杜筑生	(*March 30, 1942 in Guizhou) married to Chiu, Maria Da-rouin they have 2 sons.: LL.B., NTU; Docteur en droit, University of Paris; 1988-1989. Fellow of the Center for International Affairs of the Harvard University. .; 1976-79 Adjunct Assc. Prof. at the Soochow University.; 1977-81 Sect. Chief, MOFA.; 1981-85 Dep. Dir.- Gen., TECO. Belgium.; 1985-86 Sr. Sp., Dept. of European Aff., MOFA.; 1986-89 Dep. Dir., Dept. of Treaty & Legal Affairs.; 1989-1991 Dir.-Gen.. TECO, Greece.; 1991-93 CCNAA. Off. in Chicago .; 1993-94 Deputy Chef of Protocol, MOFA .; 1994-96 Deputy of North American Affairs.; Adjunct Prof., Tamkang U.; From 2004 to 2008 he was Chinese Ambassador to the Holy See; Publications: 1975 La Personnalite Juridiuue Internationale d Organes Subsidiaires des Nation-unies 75.; 1987: The External Rel. of the European Communities 87.; [1]		Lien Chan	Abdou Diouf
2002	Huang Yun-cheh	黃允哲	Taiwan's ambassador to Senegal, Huang Yun-cheh (黃允哲)	Yu Shyi-kun	Abdoulaye Wade	November 2, 2005
January 2006			The governments in Beijing and Dakar established diplomatic relations.	Wen Jiabao	Abdoulaye Wade	
January 31, 2006	Lu Shaye	zh:卢沙野	(*October 1964): since February 2017 he is ambassador in Ottawa Canada.; From January 2006 to November 2009 he was ambassador in Dakar Senegal.	Wen Jiabao	Abdoulaye Wade	November 2009
November 2009	Gong Yuanxing	zh:龚元兴	(*March 1953): From August 2001 - January 2004 he was ambassador to Guinea.; From December 2006 to May 2009 he was ambassador in Rabat (Morocco).; From November 2009 to August 2012 he was Ambassador in Dakar (Senegal).	Wen Jiabao	Abdoulaye Wade	August 2012
August 2012	Xia Huang	zh:夏煌	(*January 1961): From November 2009 to August 2012 he was Ambassador to Niger.; From September 2012 to October 2015 he was ambassador to Senegal.; Since October 2015 he is ambassador in Brazzaville (Republic of Congo).	Wen Jiabao	Macky Sall	October 2015
October 2015	Zhang Xun (diplomat)	zh:張迅	From June 2007 to December 2010 he was Ambassador to Mauritania.; From August 2011 to April 2014 he was Ambassador in Damascus (Syria).; Since October 2015 he is ambassador in Dakar (Senegal).	Li Keqiang	Macky Sall	

== See also ==
- China–Senegal relations
