= Said Djinnit =

Algerian diplomat

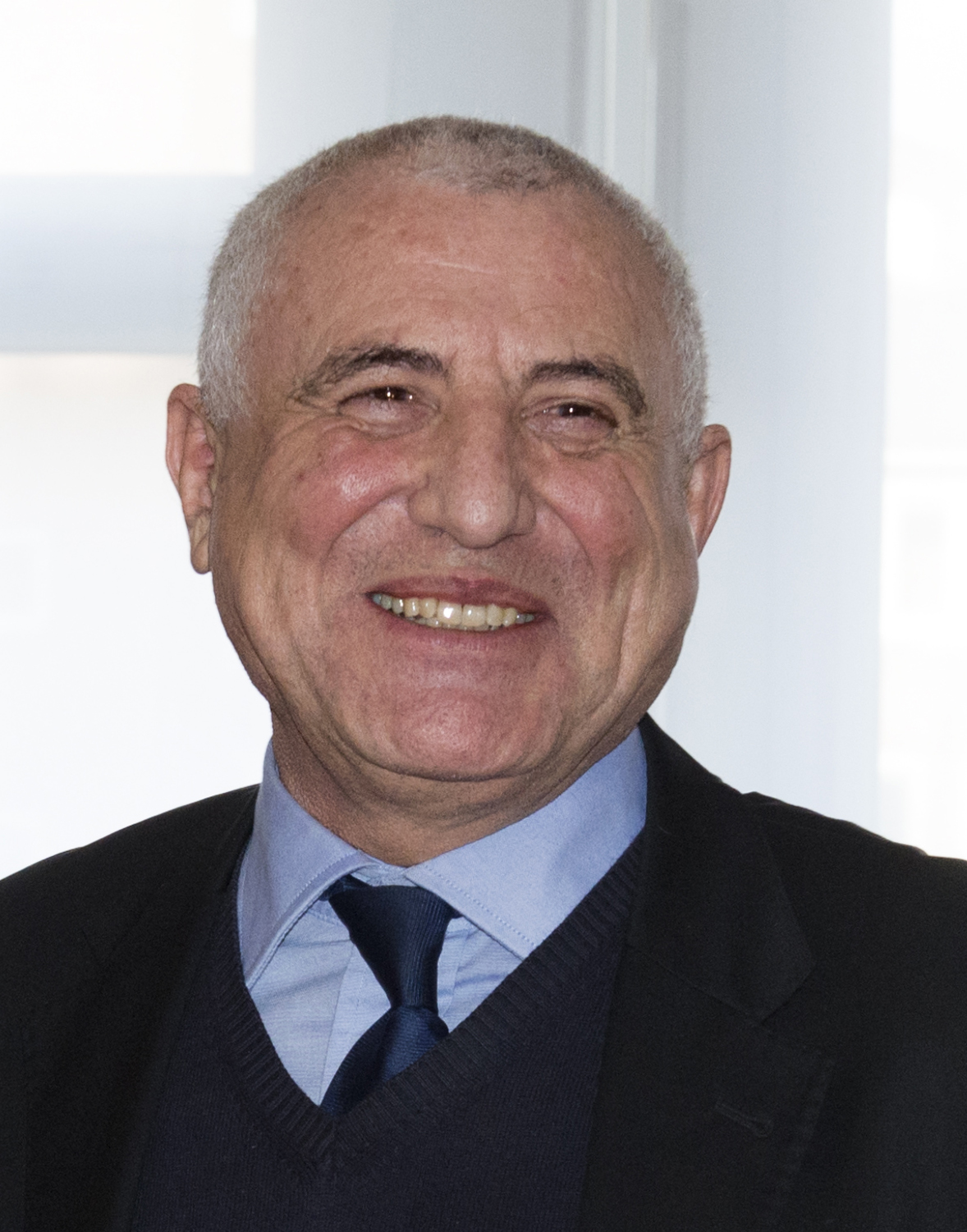

Special Envoy of the United Nations Secretary-General for the Great Lakes region
- In office July 2014 – April 2019
- Succeeded by: Xia Huang

Personal details
- Born: June 7, 1954 (age 72) Algeria
- Occupation: UN Diplomat

Said Djinnit (Arabic: سعيد جينيت) (born June 7, 1954) is an Algerian diplomat who has been Special Envoy of the United Nations Secretary-General for the Great Lakes region in Africa since 2014. Previously he served as the Special Representative and Head of the United Nations Office for West Africa (UNOWA).

Djinnit served as the Commissioner for Peace and Security at the African Union, with responsibility for issues including the Darfur conflict.

Djinnit also served in various capacities in the Organisation of African Unity (OAU), now African Union, including as OAU Assistant Secretary General for Political Affairs. At OAU, he spearheaded efforts by the General Secretariat/Commission in supporting peace processes on the continent, including Ethiopia-Eritrea, Democratic Republic of the Congo, Burundi, Comoros, Madagascar, Sierra Leone, Central Africa Republic, Ivory Coast, Liberia, Sudan, Somalia. He also helped create important OAU/AU initiatives such as the Protocol on the African Union Peace and Security Council (2002), the Conceptual Framework on the African Standby Force and Military Staff Committee, the Draft Common African Defense and Security Policy, the Protocol to the Treaty Establishing the African Economic Community relating to the Pan African Parliament, the Declaration on the Framework for an OAU Response to Unconstitutional Changes of Government (2000), the Draft Protocol to the African Charter on Human and Peoples' Rights on the Rights of Women in Africa, and the Conference on Security, Stability, Development and Cooperation in Africa (CSSDCA).

Djinnit was the leader of the African Union Commission for the deployment of the first ever African Union peacekeeping operation. Under his leadership, the Organisation of African Unity team participated in the proximity talks between Ethiopia and Eritrea and acquired the signature of both parties to the Algiers agreements of June and December 2000. He also served as Chairman of the OAU Secretariat Task Force on the drafting of the Constitutive Act of the African Union (1999–2000). He was appointed as Special Envoy of the United Nations Secretary-General for the Great Lakes Region on 17 July 2014.

As a diplomat, Djinnit also served for Algeria on various diplomatic missions. He was Chargé d'affaires of the Algerian Embassy in Brussels and Deputy Head of Mission in Addis Ababa.

Djinnit holds a diploma in diplomacy from the École nationale d'administration. He has also studied at the Centre for International Relations Studies, University of Brussels, and at the Institute of Political Affairs, University of Algiers. Djinnit is fluent in Arabic, French, and English.
