= List of ambassadors of China to Niger =

The Chinese ambassador to Niger is the official representative of the People's Republic of China to Niger.

== List of representatives ==
Name (English)	Name (Chinese)	Tenure begins	Tenure ends	Note
Huang Yuping	黄玉平	August 1974	March 1975	Chargé d'affaires
Xie Kexi	谢克西	March 1975	9 April 1979	
Wang Chuanbin	王传斌	September 1979	21 June 1982	
Wang Yupei	王毓培	May 1983	August 1985	
Xing Geng	邢耿	December 1985	February 1990	
Wu Donghe	武东和	April 1990	August 1992	
Ji Jingyi	冀敬义	September 1996	December 1996	Chargé d'affaires
Ji Jingyi	冀敬义	December 1996	January 2002	
Sun Zhaotong	孙兆通	February 2002	March 2005	
Chen Gonglai	陈公来	March 2005	October 2009	
Xia Huang	夏煌	November 2009	August 2012	
Shi Hu	石虎	August 2012	October 2016	
Zhang Lijun	张立军	November 2016	April 2021	
Jiang Feng	蒋烽	August 2021		

== See also ==
- China–Niger relations
