= Qatar as a mediator in conflict =

Qatari mediation in geopolitical conflicts

Since the 1990s, Qatar has been mediating third-party negotiations in a number of conflicts. Qatar has facilitated negotiations between Ukraine and Russia, Israel and Hamas and Hezbollah, the United States and the Taliban, Iran and Venezuela, and signing of several peace agreements for Lebanon, Yemen, Darfur and Palestine. The country has also hosted political offices for groups like Hamas in its capital Doha. Qatar also used its unique geopolitical position and links with various state and non-state actors to act as a major mediator in several international hostage crises.

Emir Sheikh Tamim bin Hamad Al-Thani said at the 77th UN General Assembly in 2022 that conflict mediation is a key element of Qatar’s foreign policy, with the goal of establishing the country as a reliable international ally.

The country's approach to mediation has been described by some as "soft diplomacy," which means that it uses its financial resources and political influence to facilitate negotiations between the opposing sides.

== Background ==
Until the 1990s, Qatar, a constitutional autocratic monarchy in the Persian Gulf region, had been perceived internationally to be under influence of Saudi Arabia. However, the country's leadership, then-Emir Sheikh Hamad bin Khalifa Al Thani and his heir Sheikh Tamim bin Hamad Al Thani, understood that mediation could become a way to boost its international standing and influence. Presenting the country as an indispensable participant in the international community would also ensure protection against interventions from the neighboring countries, especially from Saudi Arabia and the UAE. The 2017-2021 boycott led by Saudi Arabia on Qatar proved the relevance of such steps. Since the boycott, Qatar's mediation policy is based on its foreign policy principles that include friendly relations with different stakeholders, both Western states, neighboring countries, and non-state actors.

A significant event for Qatar was the Doha Development Round of 2001, when the country took up an active role in international relations.

The mediation policy of Qatar can be defined as active and independent. The country uses its wealth, connections, and diplomatic potential in order to make the sides sit at the negotiation table. The policy of Qatar can also be distinguished with its openness towards various actors, who are isolated from the international community. Due to this approach, Qatar acts as a mediator between various groups of countries and facilitates the process of making decisions in case diplomatic ways of dealing with conflicts do not exist. Friendly relations with different groups, for instance, the Muslim Brotherhood, have helped Qatar in reaching agreements, for example, the Doha Agreement in 2012.

Qatari institutions involved in conflict resolution and research, such as Doha Institute for Graduate Studies and Qatar International Academy for Security Studies, play a role in developing the country's mediation policy.

Some politicians from the United States and Europe accused Qatar of supporting several organizations considered terrorist by those countries, such as Hamas. From 2017 to 2021, several countries including Saudi Arabia, UAE, and Egypt, among others from the region, severed diplomatic ties with Qatar, accusing it of supporting "Iranian-backed" non-state actors. This charge was rejected by Doha.

== Key Qatari mediation events ==
=== US-Taliban conflict ===
American intervention in Afghanistan in response to 9/11 is regarded as the longest war in the history of the USA, and apart from many casualties, there were also huge financial and political costs associated with it. Qatar helped to mediate the United States-Taliban deal for ending almost two decades of war in Afghanistan. Qatar let the Taliban open its first office outside Afghanistan – in Doha – since the US invasion of Afghanistan. Due to difficult relations between the Afghan government, the Taliban and international players the peace process went through multiple complications including the disagreement about the prisoners release and the terms of the agreement implementation. On 29 February 2020, Qatar hosted the signing of the agreement in which the conditions for US and NATO withdrawal from Afghanistan were specified in exchange for security guarantees from the Taliban. Besides, this agreement initiated the process of negotiations between Afghan parties with the goal of establishing a permanent ceasefire and the determination of the future government of Afghanistan.

=== Sudan conflict ===
Qatar was involved as a mediator in the Sudan conflict, especially in the Darfur region. Qatar hosted and sponsored peace negotiations that led to the signing of the Doha Document for Peace in Darfur. Qatar implemented a number of development, educational, and health service initiatives in the area. The Doha negotiations led to a memorandum of understanding between the Sudanese government and the Darfurian Justice and Equity Movement in 2009. Qatar supported peace negotiations in Juba and participated in the signing of the Juba peace agreement with some factions.

=== Lebanon crisis ===
During a political crisis in Lebanon in 2008, due to Hezbollah's growing dominance, the Lebanese government shut down its telecommunications infrastructure and fired officials that were suspected of being part of the militia. As a result of these measures, Hezbollah seized parts of Beirut, thereby sealing off major air and sea ports in the area. Another round of fighting was completely unimaginable for Lebanon as it was slowly recovering from the destruction caused by a civil war. By May 2008, a deal was agreed upon by the conflicting parties through Qatar mediation. The deal paved the way for the organising of parliamentary elections in 2009 and an agreement whereby Hezbollah was granted a significant representation in the formation of a unity government.

=== Yemen conflict ===
Mediation efforts by Qatar in Yemen in 2007 constituted the part of a broader effort to address the conflict between the Yemeni government and the Houthi movement, a Shia Zaidi Shia group based in the northern Saada Governorate. The conflict began in 2004 and experienced several cycles of fighting, which resulted in serious humanitarian problems and regional insecurity. .

Qatar intervened in 2007 in order to help facilitate negotiations between the conflicting parties and possibly mediate peace. Mediation in Yemen is the part of the Qatari strategy to establish itself as a mediator in regional conflicts using its financial assets, strategic location, and diplomatic contacts in the region.

Qatari idea was to involve the conflicting sides in discussions of the terms of ceasefire, prisoner exchange, and peace treaty. Qatari initiative represented one of the first external attempts to mediate the conflict.

Despite Qatar's attempts, there were many difficulties for mediation, such as distrust between the conflicting sides, continuing violence, and the complicated network of local, regional, and international interests in Yemen. The 2007 mediation process did not bring any results and a solution was not achieved, as the conflict itself developed into the Yemeni civil war in 2015. The mediations carried out in 2007 failed to result in any form of permanent solution to the conflict, as the situation remained ongoing and has further developed, particularly since the onset of the wider Yemeni Civil War in 2015.

=== Iraq hostage mediation ===
The kidnap of two French journalists, Christian Chesnot and Georges Malbrunot, in Iraq in 2004 drew the international attention and the French government had to make diplomatic moves in order to help in the release of these hostages. These two journalists were held hostage by a group that called themselves "the Islamic Army in Iraq." They demanded that the release of these hostages would be contingent upon the repeal of a law in France that prohibited the wearing of headscarves by girls attending public school in France. This incident placed France in a challenging diplomatic and domestic situation, given the sensitive nature of the demands and the broader implications for French secular policy.

The government of Qatar took an initiative to try and solve the problems faced in this situation. Although the detailed information about the involvement of Qatar in the negotiation process is scanty, Qatar reportedly played a role in the negotiation process aimed at helping release the journalists. They were accused of funding political Islam following the release of the journalists.

=== Ukraine-Russia mediation ===
In 2023 Qatar mediated the release and repatriation of Ukrainian children who had been separated from their families and taken to Russia amid the ongoing conflict between Ukraine and Russia, the youngest being two years old and the oldest 17.

The government of Qatar announced on 16 October 2023, that the four Ukrainian children had been reunited with their families as a result of its mediation efforts. Six more Ukrainian children were returned to Ukraine from Russia under a deal brokered by Qatar.

The government of Russia announced on 28 November 2024, that Russia and Ukraine agreed to return to each other two nine children including seven Ukrainian children following Qatari mediation.

The Russian government announced on 14 February 2025, that Ukraine returned two children from Ukraine to Russia after Russia repatriated eight Ukrainian children in an agreement mediated by Qatar.

=== Israel-Hamas mediation ===
Qatar has mediated between Israel and Hamas, particularly in facilitating the release of Israeli hostages held by the militant group. Qatari mediation helped in the release of Gilad Shalit, an Israeli soldier who was captured by Hamas in 2006 near the Israeli-Gaza border. Shalit's captivity and the efforts to secure his release became a major issue in both domestic and foreign affairs of Israel. After years of negotiations, a deal was reached in 2011 for Shalit's release in exchange for more than 1,000 Palestinian prisoners held by Israel. Qatar, along with Egypt and Germany brokered this agreement.

Over the years Qatar was involved in negotiating ceasefires between Israel and Hamas, particularly during periods of escalated conflict and facilitated prisoner exchanges.

In 2007, Qatar and Turkey were the only countries that supported Hamas when they took control of the Gaza Strip. Since, Qatar became close allies with Hamas and their relationship strengthened between 2008-2009. In 2009 during a summit in Doha, Qatar announced to contribute $250 million to repair damages during the conflict. Khaled Meshaal, a Hamas leader, was present in the summit. Following the summit Qatar embarked on a consistent efforts to provide political, material, humanitarian, and charitable assistance to Hamas.

In 2012, Emir Hamad bin Khalifa al-Thani, made a visit to Gaza, becoming the first head of state to enter the area under Hamas governance. During his visit, he commitment to donate $400 million for rebuilding efforts.

Since 2012, Qatar has maintained a political office for Hamas in Doha. It was criticized by Israel and some members of the U.S. Congress, but Qatar justified it on the grounds that it was undertaken at the request of American officials, aiming to open a communication channel with Hamas.

==== Gaza war and hostage crisis ====
The Gaza conflict was a complicated case for the international mediators. Qatar played an important role of mediator in the process as it had relations with both Israel and Hamas. Qatari involvement in Gaza earlier with substantial investments in the infrastructure and humanitarian support gave it leverage over Hamas. In addition, due to the economic relations with Israel and security cooperation, Qatar could communicate with Israel.

In the course of the conflict, Qatar cooperated with the other players on the political arena such as Egypt and the United Nations, to broker a truce. The strategy of Qatar in solving the problem included shuttle diplomacy: the representatives of Qatar communicated with the representatives of Israel and Hamas separately to reconcile their interests. In addition, Qatar used financial power and made promises about the reconstruction of Gaza and humanitarian aid as inducements for the agreement.

Apart from diplomatic activities, Qatar made considerable humanitarian aid to the Gaza Strip. The Qatar Red Crescent Society (QRCS) declared the deployment of a relief aid ship to Gaza.

Qatar was involved in the hostage negotiations following the kidnapping of 240 Israelis on October 7 by Hamas, who have been designated as a terrorist organization by Israel, the United States, and the European Union, among others. On 22 November 2023, with the assistance of Qatar, United States and Egypt as brokers, Israel and Hamas reached an agreement to release 50 Israeli women and children captured in exchange for humanitarian concessions in Gaza and the release of Palestinian prisoners held in Israel. On 19 January 2025, ceasefire agreement brokered by Qatar, United States and Egypt suspended the Gaza war, involving the release of Israeli hostages and Palestinian prisoners. On 10 October 2025, another Gaza peace agreement brokered by Qatar, United States, Turkey and Egypt went into effect.

==== Israel-Hezbollah mediation ====
On 19 June 2026, US President Donald Trump said that Israel and Hezbollah agreed to a truce in the 2026 Lebanon war mediated by the US, Qatar and Iran.

==== Iran ====
On 24 June 2025, Qatar gained Iran's approval to the US proposal for a ceasefire in the Twelve-Day War. Primary mediator Pakistan and Qatar, Saudi Arabia, Turkey and Egypt facilitated negotiations before the Islamabad Memorandum to end the 2026 Iran war. On 11 June 2026, key gaps regarding the release of frozen Iranian assets, the reopening of the Hormuz Strait, and protocols for managing Iran's nuclear program during a 60-day ceasefire in the 2026 Iran war were narrowed in talks between Iranian officials and Qatari mediators in Tehran, coordinated with the United States. On 17 June, US President Trump and Iranian President Masoud Pezeshkian signed the memorandum of understanding to end the war, with Trump signing the document during dinner with French President Emmanuel Macron at the Palace of Versailles after the G7 summit. On 2 August, after Qatari efforts to head off the attacks and open the Hormuz and Saudi Crown Prince Mohammed bin Salman expressed concern about Trump's plans for massive strikes on Iran, Trump stated that he and Israel had called off the attack after the Iranian regime requested more time for a deal, emphasising the US' military readiness for a massive bombing campaign against the regime on a scale not seen since the World War II.

==== Release of Elizabeth Tsurkov ====
Qatar played a role in the release of Israeli-Russian hostage Elizabeth Tsurkov by Kata'ib Hezbollah on 9 September 2025. Parts of her release process relied on Qatar.

==== Venezuela ====
Qatar has acted as a middleman between the United States and Venezuela, facilitating negotiations between the Venezuelan administration and the opposition.
