= Olivier Nduhungirehe =

Rwandan diplomat (born 1975)

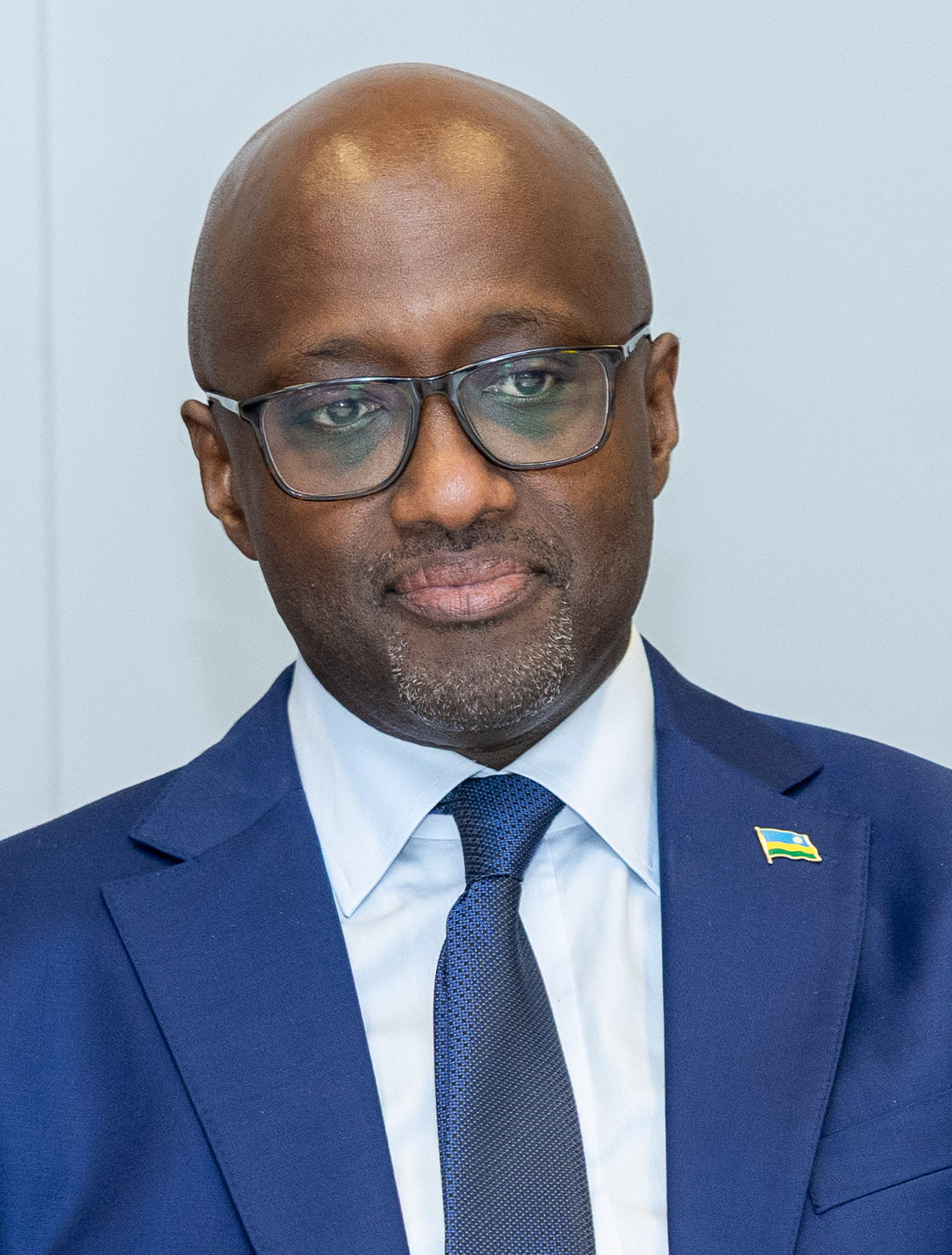
- Olivier Nduhungirehe in 2025

Minister of Foreign Affairs and Cooperation
- Incumbent
- Assumed office 12 June 2024
- President: Paul Kagame
- Preceded by: Vincent Biruta

Rwandan Ambassador to the Netherlands
- In office December 2015 – September 2017
- President: Paul Kagame

Personal details
- Born: 13 September 1975 (age 51) Huye District, Rwanda
- Party: Social Democratic Party

Olivier Jean Patrick Nduhungirehe (born 13 September 1975) is a Rwandan diplomat who has served as Foreign Minister of Rwanda since June 2024.

== Career ==
Born in Huye District, Rwanda, Nduhungirehe served as Ambassador of Rwanda to the Netherlands from December 2015 to September 2017, and from then to April 2020 as representative of the Foreign Ministry to the East African Community. He has also been a representative before the Organisation for the Prohibition of Chemical Weapons.

In June 2024, Nduhungirehe replaced Vincent Biruta as Foreign Minister of Rwanda.

Nduhungirehe speaks fluent Kinyarwanda, English, and French.

During the Goma offensive in 2025, where M23 took the city of Goma, in the eastern Democratic Republic of the Congo, Nduhungirehe urged a ceasefire, and called on DR Congo to negotiate with M23 rebels, whom the DR Congo considers as terrorists. Nduhungirehe had previously accused DR Congo, in October 2024, of refusing to sign a deal to reduce fighting in Kivu. Nduhungirehe has maintained the official Rwandan position that Rwanda does not support M23.

On 27 June 2025 he signed a peace agreement in Washington on behalf of Rwanda with the DRC's foreign minister Thérèse Kayikwamba Wagner.
