= Thérèse Kayikwamba Wagner =

Foreign minister of the DR Congo since 2024

Minister of State Thérèse Kayikwamba Wagner
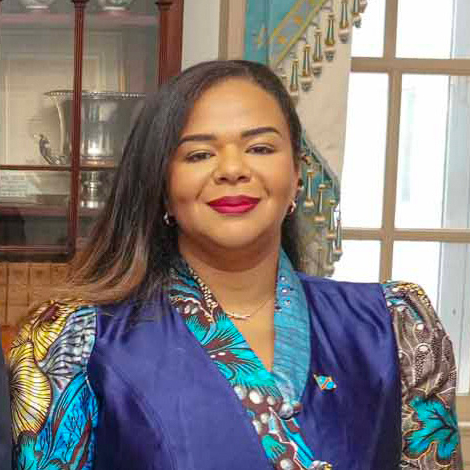
- Kayikwamba Wagner agreeing to peace in 2025

Minister of Foreign Affairs
- Incumbent
- Assumed office 13 June 2024
- President: Félix Tshisekedi
- Prime Minister: Judith Suminwa
- Preceded by: Christophe Lutundula

Personal details
- Born: 1983 (age 42–43) Kinshasa, Zaire
- Education: Harvard University; Fordham University; Global Campus of Human Rights; Johannes Gutenberg University Mainz

Thérèse Kayikwamba Wagner (born 1983) is a political scientist and politician who was appointed Foreign Minister of the Democratic Republic of the Congo on 13 June 2024. She replaced Christophe Lutundula.

== Background and education ==
She was born in 1983 in the city of Kinshasa, the capital of DR Congo, then known as Zaire. Her mother is Congolese and her father is a former German Catholic priest, Johannes Wilhelm Wagner, from Bad Münstereifel in North Rhine-Westphalia. Born in 1937, Wagner came to Congo in 1966 where he served in the St. Alphonse parish in the popular area of Matete. He resigned from the priesthood in 1977 to marry his Congolese partner, Thérèse Kayikwamba Kabundji from Mbuji-Mayi in the Kasaï region. They have three children, two girls and a deceased son. Wagner spent her childhood in Kinshasa, Germany, Lomé and Accra. She has academic degrees from Harvard Kennedy School, Fordham University, Global Campus of Human Rights and Johannes Gutenberg University Mainz. Her older sister, Katharina Mbuyi Wagner, born in 1978 in Kinshasa, is the senior foreign affairs political advisor to president Félix Tshisekedi.

== Business career ==
She has a varied career in the public and private service. Between 2009 and 2011 she worked with the German International Development Cooperation Agency (GIZ), based in Kigali, Rwanda. She then relocated to Goma, DR Congo and took up employment with Oxfam. The following year she assumed leadership responsibility of Oxfam's program to protect civilians.

In 2014, she joined the United Nations, working in peacekeeping missions, including MONUSCO (DR Congo) and MINUSCA (Central African Republic). In 2019, she relocated to Nairobi (Kenya), working there as the assistant to Xia Huang, the United Nations special envoy for the African Great Lakes Region. Her position before being appointed cabinet minister was as the Regional Program Manager for Sub-Saharan Africa at the Meta Group.

== Political career ==
On 29 May 2024, Thérèse Kayikwamba Wagner was appointed Minister of Foreign Affairs, International Cooperation and Francophonie of the DRC in the Suminwa government, headed by Prime Minister Judith Suminwa Tuluka. Kayikwamba replaced Christophe Lutundula. She took office on 13 June 2024. One of her immediate tasks was to attempt to work out a diplomatic settlement between the March 23 Movement, the government of Rwanda and the government of the Democratic Republic of the Congo. The other immediate task was to oversee the gradual withdrawal of MONUSCO forces from the country.

In June 2025 she was in the Béatrice Hotel in Kinshasa for a Synergy of Women for Peace and Security workshop with Déborah Nyamugabo, of the National Women's Coalition and a representative of UN Women. On 27 June she signed the DRC–Rwanda peace agreement on behalf of the DRC with Rwandan foreign minister Olivier Nduhungirehe. The agreement, facilitated by the United States, aimed to bring lasting peace to eastern Congo.

== See also ==
- Cabinet of the Democratic Republic of the Congo

Political offices
Preceded by Christophe Lutundula	Foreign minister of the Democratic Republic of the Congo; 2024–present	Incumbent
