= Xia Huang =

Chinese diplomat and UN official

- 夏煌

Special Envoy of the Secretary-General of the United Nations for the Great Lakes Region
- Incumbent
- Assumed office April 2019
- Preceded by: Said Djinnit

Chinese Ambassador to the Republic of Congo
- In office October 2015 – May 2018
- Preceded by: Guan Jian
- Succeeded by: Ma Fulin

Chinese Ambassador to Senegal
- In office September 2012 – September 2015
- Preceded by: Gong Yuanxing
- Succeeded by: Zhang Xun

Chinese Ambassador to Niger
- In office November 2009 – October 2012
- Preceded by: Chen Gonglai
- Succeeded by: Shi Hu

Personal details
- Born: January 1962 (age 64) Zhu County, Hebei, China
- Party: Chinese Communist Party
- Education: China Foreign Affairs University; University of Liège; École nationale d'administration

Xia Huang (Chinese: 夏煌; pinyin: Xià Huáng; born January 1962) is a Chinese diplomat who currently serves as Special Envoy of the Secretary-General of the United Nations for the Great Lakes Region, a position he took up on April 1, 2019.

== Biography ==
Xia was born in Zhu County, Hebei, in January 1962. After the Resumption of College Entrance Examination in 1980, he entered the China Foreign Affairs University, where he graduated in August 1985. He went to the Law School of the University of Liège in Belgium for further study. After university, he interned at the Chinese Embassy in Belgium.

Xia returned to China in January 1987 and that same year became an official in the Ministry of Foreign Affairs. In August 1990 he was sent to Gabon, where he worked as an attaché. In September 1996, he was accepted to the École nationale d'administration and graduated in February 1998. Then he worked in the Translation Office of the Ministry of Foreign Affairs.

He was counsellor of the Chinese Embassy in France in June 2002, and held that office until July 2007. Then he served as an official in the Standing Committee of the Jiamusi Chinese Communist Party Committee. In November 2009 he was appointed Chinese Ambassador to Niger, a position he held until October 2012, when he was transferred to Senegal and appointed the Chinese Ambassador. In October 2015 he became Chinese Ambassador to the Republic of Congo, and served until May 2018. He was appointed Special Envoy of the Secretary-General of the United Nations for the Great Lakes Region in January 2019 by U.N. Secretary-General António Guterres.

Diplomatic posts
Preceded by Chen Gonglai	Chinese Ambassador to Niger; 2009–2012	Succeeded by Shi Hu
Preceded by Gong Yuanxing	Chinese Ambassador to Senegal; 2012–2015	Succeeded by Zhang Xun
Preceded by Guan Jian	Chinese Ambassador to the Republic of Congo; 2015–2018	Succeeded by Ma Fulin
