= Timeline of the M23 campaign (2026) =

This timeline of the M23 campaign (2022–present) covers the period from January 2026 to the present day.

== January 2026 ==
=== 1–4 January ===
On 1 January 2026, M23 rebels from Kasopo, Masisi Territory, attempted to outflank FARDC positions near Buhimba on the Walikale–Masisi border but were repelled by a joint FARDC–Wazalendo force and retreated back to Kasopo and Mahanga as FARDC reportedly captured around ten rebels. On 2 January, M23 clashed with FARDC–Wazalendo forces in Kasenyi, in the Katoyi sector of Masisi Territory, as part of an effort to "expand their area of influence". On 3 January, they launched another attack in Kilongo, about 3 km from Buhimba in the Waloa Yungu groupement of Walikale Territory. In Masisi Territory, M23 clashed with FARDC–Wazalendo forces in Bingaro, Katoyi, after reinforcing from Kazinga, while another rebel advance toward Humura was repelled by "loyalist forces" backed by Wazalendo. That same day, FARDC presented captured suspects in Kinshasa, including seven Rwandan soldiers and eight foreign civilians, as evidence of Rwanda's direct involvement alongside M23 in North and South Kivu, arguing that the arrests contradicted Rwanda's claims of a defensive posture, demonstrated that it was actively waging war inside Congolese territory, attempting to regionalize the conflict by involving foreign nationals and allied armed groups, and violating UN Security Council resolutions as well as the December 2025 Washington peace agreement.

=== 5–11 January ===
On 5 January, President Tshisekedi met Angolan President João Lourenço in Luanda, during which Tshisekedi said Lourenço presented "interesting" ideas aimed at resolving the conflict in eastern DRC. A follow-up meeting scheduled for 8 January was intended to further develop these proposals, whose specific details remain unclear, and to underline that any Angolan-led initiative would not replace the Washington and Doha tracks but rather encourage the parties to honor their existing commitments, with Lourenço potentially facilitating political dialogue in Kinshasa involving Tshisekedi and various Congolese stakeholders, including M23, opposition figures, and representatives of religious and civil society groups, who would participate without leading the process. Although the leaders did not address calls for a fully inclusive dialogue sought by some Congolese elites, Angola reportedly reached out to certain opposition members about possible talks. Tshisekedi stated that any engagement would first require M23 to announce an immediate and unconditional ceasefire, which he would then assess.

Meanwhile, violence continued on the ground: between 5 and 8 January, four people were killed in Sake by armed men believed to be M23 rebels who control the area, and on 6 January, the group dropped bombs in Katobo forest in Walikale Territory's Kisimba groupement, which alarmed residents and farmers despite no active clashes in the area. On 7 January, the M23 reinforced its positions in Mpeti, Kisimba, with three trucks carrying fighters and ammunition from Kalembe, 18 km from Pinga, before returning empty, as local officials stated that the buildup aimed to launch long-planned offensives against the strategic town of Pinga. On 11 January, Wazalendo attacked M23 positions in Kazinga, using heavy and light weapons to preempt a rebel offensive against FARDC–Wazalendo positions in the Nyamaboko 1 and 2 groupements. In Fizi Territory, a vessel known as Super Bus, en route to Bujumbura for repairs while navigating Lake Tanganyika, was intercepted near Makobola 2 by a joint FARDC maritime and Wazalendo patrol. This followed the seizure of another boat, Okako 2, captured on 8 January in the village of Mizimu, also in Fizi Territory. Since M23's capture of Uvira, authorities imposed additional restrictions to curb movement in the region, including a ban on traffic between South Kivu and Tanganyika provinces via Lake Tanganyika, with all vessels now considered suspicious amid ongoing hostilities.

=== 12–16 January ===
On 12 January, nine M23 fighters from Lubero Territory surrendered to the Wazalendo faction of the Forces Patriotiques pour la Paix/Armée du Peuple (FPP/AP) in Fatua in the Kisimba groupement, Walikale Territory, after "fleeing the suffering they endured in the rebellion". On 15 January, M23 pushed through multiple locations in South Kivu, including Kaziba Chiefdom, Langala, and Rubanga, before reaching Lemera, where its fighters split into two groups, one advancing toward Kidote and the other toward Nakandongo. That day, the movement announced that it was transferring responsibility for Uvira's security to the international community, reiterating its decision, first stated on 15 December 2025, to withdraw its forces. Corneille Nangaa stated that M23 had completely pulled out its monitoring unit and would no longer be responsible for maintaining security in Uvira, calling on international actors to protect civilians and uphold order. He warned that armed groups outside the peace process, including the Burundian army, the FDLR, Wazalendo, and mercenaries allied with the Congolese army, could destabilize the city and undermine peace initiatives. Nonetheless, in Uvira, M23 rebels confiscated road construction materials, loading tar onto 34 Wowo trucks bound for Rwanda, seizing tricycles transported by other vehicles, evacuating remaining equipment through the Kamanyola border crossing, and driving cattle and small livestock from the highlands and midlands toward Bwegera to unknown destinations. In Fizi Territory, M23-allied Twirwaneho rebels clashed with FARDC in Tuwetuwe, about 15 km from the Mikenge displacement site in the Itombwe sector of Mwenga Territory, forcing government troops to retreat toward Point Zero village on the Fizi–Mwenga border in the Mitumba highlands, a settlement established in 2018 by internally displaced persons fleeing violence in the highlands of Fizi, Mwenga, and Uvira Territories and serving as the FARDC's final defensive position. On 16 January, Twirwaneho rebels seized Point Zero and forced FARDC units to retreat to Mulima village in the Basilotcha groupement of the Tanganyika sector. Its capture opened a corridor for the rebels along the Mulima–Mukera axis toward Fizi-center, from where they could easily advance toward Tanganyika Province via Misisi without passing through Baraka. After the fall of Point Zero, displaced civilians were once again forced to flee in heavy rains to Bilende, Kanguli, Nakiele, Mulima, and Lusuku, where they faced extremely precarious living conditions due to the lack of assistance after abandoning all their belongings.

=== 16–20 January ===
Following a high-level meeting in Lomé on 16–17 January, the African Union outlined a structured mediation framework for eastern DRC led by Faure Gnassingbé as chief mediator, and to address the conflict's complexity, the AU appointed five former African heads of state as co-facilitators: Oluṣẹgun Ọbasanjọ (military and security), Sahle-Work Zewde (humanitarian affairs), Uhuru Kenyatta (armed-group dialogue), Mokgweetsi Masisi (regional economic cooperation), and Catherine Samba-Panza (civil society, reconciliation, and women's issues). The framework also includes an independent joint secretariat bringing together the AU, regional organizations, and neighboring blocs, with the AU Commission coordinating with international partners such as the UN, Qatar, the EU, and major global powers. The meeting urged both the DRC and M23 to fast-track the fulfillment of their commitments, emphasized peaceful solutions to the conflict, reiterated its full backing of the Doha process, and called on the parties to resume talks promptly to finalize negotiations on the six remaining protocols. On 17 January, M23 stated that it had finalized its withdrawal from Uvira. While the bulk of its forces and equipment had departed, observers reported a residual presence, including a column of at least 200 armed fighters leaving the city, some walking and others transported by trucks, with heavy weapons visibly carried. Gunfire, including RPG fire, was reported around Uvira that day. South Kivu Governor Jean-Jacques Purusi Sadiki said that M23 elements were still present and holding positions on hills overlooking the city, particularly in Katongo, Kigongo, Makobola 1 and 2, and the Kivovo mountains. He also noted that other fighters had withdrawn toward Sange, Luvungi, and the South Kivu Sugar Refinery, roughly 15 kilometers from Uvira, calling the situation a clear breach of the ceasefire, which stipulates a withdrawal beyond Kamanyola, outside Uvira Territory. On 18 January, witnesses reported the presence of youths claiming to be Wazalendo in certain quartiers, while FARDC troops were not reported in the city. FARDC later confirmed on 19 January that it had reestablished control over Uvira on 18 January and stated that its forces remained deployed in and around the city to consolidate positions and protect civilians and their property. Meanwhile, in Walikale Territory, FARDC carried out airstrikes on M23 positions on Mount Kasopo along the Kisimba–Ikobo border.

=== 21–29 January ===
On 21 January, Muhindo Mungumwa Claude, the M23-installed chief of Kanyabayonga groupement in Bwito Chiefdom, and his wife were shot dead in their home by unidentified gunmen, which mirrors a similar October 2025 killing in Buramba where another chief, known as Maliro, was murdered with bladed weapons. On 22 January, Rwanda for the first time openly acknowledged coordinating with M23 in a statement to the U.S. Congress, in which Ambassador Mathilde Mukantabana said that Rwanda was "engaging in security coordination with the AFC/M23 in order to build trust through transparency", describing the cooperation as defensive, aimed at countering the FDLR and protecting Tutsi populations, and arguing that it helped persuade M23 to unilaterally withdraw from Uvira as evidence of de-escalation. The admission marked a major shift from Rwanda's longstanding denials of ties to M23 and prompted a Congolese national deputy, Joseph Nkoy Wembo, to declare that "the masks have fallen", as Rwanda acknowledged its direct role in the conflict in the DRC. On 23 January, FARDC conducted attack-drone airstrikes that destroyed an M23 position in Buleusa, in the Ikobo groupement of Walikale Territory, which forced the rebels to flee as the army increasingly relied on drone warfare to locate and neutralize rebel bases, before targeting a new M23 position in Kikuku in Bwito Chiefdom, where residents reported significant material damage, including the destruction of the rebel-occupied camp. That same day, M23 repeatedly attempted to enter Pinga and outflank FARDC and Volunteers for the Defense of the Homeland (Volontaires pour la Défense de la Patrie; VDP) positions at the strategic Nkobe hill overlooking Munsanga village, but were repelled by loyalist forces and pushed back toward Buhaya near Mpeti. On 24 January, FARDC drones bombed M23 positions in Mpeti and Mindjendje in Walikale Territory's Kisimba groupement, locations that are regarded as key regrouping and supply points for the rebels, who had been reinforced by units from Kitshanga, Mwesso, and Kalembe in Masisi Territory. On 26 January, two people were abducted by armed men in Kateku, Ikobo groupement, with the incident occurring in an M23-controlled area where recurrent kidnappings and looting in Walikale Territory have fueled local suspicions; meanwhile, during the night of 25–26 January, the chief of Bushani village in the Luberike groupement was assassinated at his home under unclear circumstances. According to the administrative authorities of the Wanianga sector, the killing was attributed to M23 rebels active in the area. On 29 January, M23 fighters advancing from Mpeti launched an attack on FARDC-Wazalendo positions and the Armed Reserve of the Defense (Réserve armée de la défense; RAD) around Chanjikiro, in the Kisimba groupement of Walikale Territory, but the attack was repelled by FARDC and its allied forces, and forced M23 units to withdraw toward Mpeti, after which the Congolese Air Force carried out drone strikes on rebel positions in Mindjendje near Mpeti. According to Major Dieudonné Kasereka, spokesperson for the FARDC's 34th Military Region, a total of 265 M23 rebels surrendered to the FARDC in January 2026, primarily in Walikale, Rutshuru, and Lubero Territories in North Kivu, as well as Kalehe Territory in South Kivu.

== Late January–February 2026 ==
=== 29 January–8 February ===
In Fizi Territory, Wazalendo launched an offensive to capture Minembwe. A FARDC attack drone reportedly bombed the Madegu quartier in Minembwe around 31 January. Between 31 January and 2 February, FARDC-Wazalendo forces reportedly engaged in fighting with Twirwaneho and RED-Tabara rebels in several villages north of Minembwe, including Mikenge, Tuwetuwe, and Kalingi, as well as in the Kamombo and Bijombo groupements. Additional clashes were reported south of Minembwe around 2 February, notably in Muliza and Kakenge villages. These clashes formed part of an ongoing FARDC offensive aimed at retaking Minembwe, following the recapture of Point Zéro village near Minembwe on 29 January. Meanwhile, on 31 January and 1 February, Kisangani Bangoka International Airport came under attack by kamikaze drones carrying unconventional payloads made up of several submunitions. The Tshopo provincial government blamed Rwanda and its M23 allies, denouncing the strike as a "barbaric, unjust, and ongoing aggression" against the DRC. FARDC forces and their security partners intercepted and neutralized eight drones before they reached their targets, and no casualties or significant damage were reported. The rebel movement claimed to have carried out the "destruction of the drone command center installed at Kisangani airport", from where the army conducts attacks in the areas under its occupation, "notably in Masisi, Walikale, Rutshuru, Lubero, Kalehe, Mwenga, Minembwe". On 2 February, the Congolese government and AFC-M23 advanced the Doha peace process by signing the mandate for the Ceasefire Monitoring and Verification Mechanism during a meeting in Doha that brought together regional and international actors who agreed to strengthen monitoring, verification, and information-sharing, including the deployment of an initial MONUSCO mission to Uvira to monitor the ceasefire on the ground. On 3 February, FARDC-Wazalendo forces repelled an M23 attack in Kalinga, Kisimba groupement, and forced them to withdraw toward Mpombi in Balinda, after which M23 bombarded Kalinga village despite it remaining under FARDC-Wazalendo control. In Rutshuru Territory, M23 fighters advancing from Mweso in Masisi Territory launched simultaneous attacks on Wazalendo positions overlooking Kivuma and Kanyangohe in Bwito Chiefdom, but were ultimately pushed back toward Mweso. On 8–9 February, FARDC carried out drone strikes on M23 positions in Mindjendje, reportedly wounding several rebels amid renewed clashes as the group reinforced its positions around Pinga.

=== 10–20 February ===
On 10 February, amid intensified international ceasefire efforts, M23 announced in Tshanzu, Rutshuru Territory, the completion of a training program integrating 7,532 new fighters into its armed wing, the Armée révolutionnaire congolaise (ARC), a figure that could not be independently verified. The following day, 11 February, FARDC carried out further airstrikes against M23 positions near Mpeti, while the M23-RDF coalition reportedly set fire to several civilian homes in Rusankuku, in the Fizi-Uvira highlands. On 12 February, M23 withdrew from the strategic Buhaya hill overlooking Katobi, about 15 km from Pinga, a position it had held since displacing Wazalendo in November 2025, for reasons that remained unclear. That same day, the UN Special Representative and Interim Head of MONUSCO, Vivian van de Perre, began a visit to Goma to engage stakeholders and advance preparations for the Ceasefire Monitoring and Verification Mechanism, landing by UN helicopter at Goma International Airport for the first time since its closure following the rebel takeover of the city. On 13 February, unidentified armed men raided Kateku village in the Ikobo groupement during the night, looting livestock, mobile phones, cash, and other valuables, with residents accusing M23, which controls the area, of being responsible. On 15 February, nine M23 fighters surrendered to Wazalendo in Chanjikiro, handing over four AK-47 rifles amid sustained FARDC pressure on rebel positions around Pinga. On 17 and 18 February, joint FARDC-Wazalendo forces fought M23-affiliated militias in several villages surrounding Minembwe, and on 18 February FARDC reported killing and capturing an unspecified number of newly trained M23 recruits who had graduated from the group's Tchanzu training facility. Additional fighting on 19 February involved Twirwaneho and Ngumino fighters aligned with M23 in the highlands near Minembwe, including in Tuwetuwe, Bilalombili, and Mikenge, as both sides contested control of Point Zéro village. The FARDC General Staff added that RDF and M23 elements conducted coordinated assaults on 18–19 February against FARDC positions in Ihula (Walikale Territory) and on the hills of Kazaraho, Bugabo, Cahi, and Virumbi (Rutshuru Territory), North Kivu. In South Kivu, FARDC attributed additional attacks in Mikenge, Kalonge, Kahungwe, Kanga, and Lugeje to a coalition of RDF, M23, Twirwaneho, FNL, Nzabapema, and RED-Tabara, reporting four houses destroyed and the death of 18-year-old Matabishi Siston Azini.

=== 21–28 February ===
On 22 February, M23 clashed with Wazalendo in Kasenyi, Chugi, and Kinigi in Bahunde Chiefdom of Masisi Territory near the mining town of Rubaya, with Wazalendo retaking the three towns, previously regarded as strategic M23 strongholds, and reportedly seizing military equipment during the fighting. M23 rebels reinforced their troops on "Sita" hill to curb the opposing advance and attempt to retake Chugi and Kinigi, while separately reporting that FARDC carried out drone strikes in several parts of Masisi Territory. On 23 February, Wazalendo continued their push toward Runigi, Kabara, Kiruli, and Kanyalu in the direction of Rubaya, while that same day the Kavimvira crossing, a key trade route linking Uvira and Bujumbura, resumed operations after Congolese authorities regained control of the area. On 24 February, FARDC drones struck M23 targets in Kishusha, near Rubaya, as clashes intensified again around Rubaya and elsewhere in Masisi Territory. Willy Ngoma, spokesperson for M23's armed wing, was reportedly killed in a strike in Rubaya. Preliminary accounts suggested several senior M23 figures were injured, though Sultani Makenga had reportedly departed the area prior to the attack. In South Kivu, FARDC is reportedly benefiting from contractors allegedly linked to Erik Prince, who are said to be aiding FARDC operations against Twirwaneho forces in the highlands. Meanwhile, the FDNB, regarded as FARDC's principal regional ally, redeployed troops in large numbers via Lake Tanganyika beginning in late December and early January. By 25 February, approximately 5,000 FDNB forces were fighting alongside FARDC and Wazalendo forces in South Kivu. On 26 February, two civilians were killed during an exchange of fire between M23 fighters and an unidentified armed group in the JTN concession in Bwito Chiefdom. In Masisi Territory, Chugi, Katobo, and Kaniro, which are strategic villages controlling access to Rubaya, returned to M23 control after clashes with Wazalendo. Although Wazalendo had captured them on 23 February, they withdrew after four days following a reinforced M23 counteroffensive. That same day, Kasenyi and Luke also fell back under M23 control.

== March 2026 ==
=== 1–2 March ===
On 1 March, Bangboka International Airport was again targeted in a series of drone attacks that caused no casualties. One drone was intercepted around 3 p.m., followed by three additional "kamikaze" drones neutralized between 5 p.m. and 7 p.m. The governor of Tshopo blamed M23 and Rwanda for the attack. According to the Congolese research institute Ebuteli, FARDC has employed Turkish-made TAI Anka drones and Chinese CH-4 combat drones. The same source alleges that the airport attack involved Turkish Baykar YIHA-III drones, while M23 reportedly operated Estonian-made Threod Systems drones. M23 later claimed responsibility, stating that the operation to "neutralize and destroy drones" that it alleges were preparing to be launched to "massacre civilians and attack its positions" near Kisangani. That same 1 March, M23 recaptured the Katoyi sector in southern Masisi Territory and Buhimba village in Walikale Territory's Waloa-Yungu groupement after attacking FARDC positions from Kilongo and forcing them to retreat to Ngenge, a locality west of Buhimba. On 2 March, FARDC–Wazalendo forces repelled an M23 assault on the strategic Fungura Hill, which overlooks Katobi in the Kisimba groupement of Walikale Territory, after the rebels advanced from Mpeti. The hill is considered a key defensive position protecting Pinga, and its capture could have created a corridor toward nearby settlements. Meanwhile, in Rutshuru Territory, M23 released more than 5,000 FARDC soldiers in Rumangabo and handed them over to the International Committee of the Red Cross (ICRC) for repatriation to Kinshasa. In May 2025, the ICRC had already facilitated the transfer of more than 1,300 disarmed soldiers from Goma to Kinshasa. On the diplomatic front the same day, the United States Department of the Treasury imposed sanctions on the RDF and four senior officials, such as Army Chief of Staff Vincent Nyakarundi, Major General Ruki Karusisi, Chief of Defence Staff Mubarakh Muganga, and Special Operations commander Stanislas Gashugi, for supporting, training, and fighting alongside M23 in eastern DRC.

=== 3–13 March ===
On 3 March, M23 fighters advancing mainly from the Ndete and Kasopo axes captured Kazinga village in the Nyamaboko I groupement of Masisi Territory, roughly two weeks after losing it to FARDC forces. Kazinga is a strategic locality in the Osso-Banyungu sector that provides access to Buhimba and the Katoyi sector. On 5 March, M23 fighters withdrew without clashes from Buabo and Ndete villages in the same sector. Wazalendo elements reoccupied both villages on 6 March. The reasons for M23's withdrawal remain unclear, though some local observers suggest government forces may have exerted pressure while attempting to encircle this strategic zone. Meanwhile, on the diplomatic front that same day, 6 March, the State Department announced visa restrictions on "several senior Rwandan officials" accused of fueling instability in eastern DRC. Washington stated that such actions violate the Washington Agreements and contribute to violence in the Great Lakes region. On 7 March, an airstrike attributed to FARDC targeted an M23 position in the Mushaki area of Masisi Territory. The strike reportedly hit a rebel position located on the farm of businessman and former national deputy Édouard Mwangachuchu and was carried out using a military drone. M23 political spokesperson Lawrence Kanyuka said the attack caused civilian casualties, although several local sources reported that no civilian losses had been immediately confirmed in surrounding villages. On 9 March, FARDC–Wazalendo forces dislodged M23 rebels from their position in Mukole in the Kisimba groupement. The Mukole capture provides FARDC a strategic vantage point from which they can monitor nearby localities, including Ihula and Kalonge in Walikale Territory and Kalembe in neighboring Masisi Territory, areas still held by M23. In separate clashes, FARDC–Wazalendo forces also recaptured Kazinga village in Masisi Territory. On 10 March, FARDC reported shooting down several one-way attack drones over Mikenge village in Mwenga Territory, claiming that the drones were operated by RDF and M23-affiliated fighters. Pro-government media also alleged that the RDF deployed a helicopter to Minembwe. That same day, 18 former M23 rebels who had surrendered the previous week in Chanjikiro (Kisimba groupement, Walikale Territory) arrived in Pinga. The defectors cited sustained military pressure from FARDC–Wazalendo forces, as well as harsh living conditions within the rebel movement, as reasons for their surrender. On 11 March, drone strikes reportedly hit the Himbi quartier in the Goma commune, which damaged homes, injuring several civilians, and killing three people, including Karine Buisset, a UNICEF specialist working on protection against sexual exploitation and abuse. The identities of the other two victims have not been officially confirmed. On 12 March, in Kinshasa, the Deputy Prime Minister of Defense held talks with François Moreillon of the ICRC regarding the release of prisoners of war in eastern DRC. Moreillon stated that the discussions were part of the Doha peace process and aligned with the ICRC's mandate as a neutral intermediary.

=== 14–20 March ===
On 14 March, Wazalendo seized Malemo village in the Bashali-Mokoto groupement of Bashali Chiefdom after engaging M23 rebels. The village lies along the Kalembe–Mpeti axis, which is a strategic route that connects Masisi Territory to Walikale Territory. After the clashes, some M23 fighters withdrew toward Kalembe village in the eastern part of the groupement, while others retreated to Mindjendje and Mpeti in the Kisimba groupement of Walikale Territory. On 15 March, FARDC–Wazalendo forces carried out clashes and drone strikes against Twirwaneho positions near Minembwe, particularly around Kalingi. On 16 March, Wazalendo fighters from the Virunga National Park area reportedly attacked M23 positions in Mugunga and Lac Vert quartiers in the western Goma, but M23 forces repelled the assault, and reportedly killed at least 13 Wazalendo fighters. That same day, FARDC arrested two Wazalendo leaders active in Kalehe Territory, Masisi Territory, and Walikale Territory, citing human rights violations and ongoing internal conflicts between them. On 17 March, Malemo returned to M23 control after Wazalendo forces voluntarily withdrew to their previous positions, which allowed M23 to reoccupy the village without resistance. The reasons for the withdrawal remain unclear, though reports suggest that M23 elements regrouped in Mpeti and Kalembe took advantage of the situation to return.

In South Kivu, multiple clashes were reported between M23 and FARDC–Wazalendo forces. On 15 March, Wazalendo fighters reportedly blocked civilian movement along the RN5 at Kasambura, about three miles south of Kabunambo, accusing certain residents of spying for M23. A local source told Actualite.cd on 18 March that the closure may have been requested by the Burundian government, which suspected M23 infiltration from the Ruzizi Plain. On 17 March, heavy fighting was reported around Runingu, Biriba, Kabunambo, and Sange along the RN5, as well as in midland areas west of the road. Senior M23 officials and affiliated sources claimed that DRC coalition forces initiated the clashes and shelled their positions. However, FARDC denied these accusations on 18 March, also rejecting claims that M23 had captured Kirungu or made advances in the Ruzizi Plain. Pro-government journalists reported that FARDC forces prevented M23 from advancing toward Kirungu after the rebels seized Mitamba. Journalist Daniel Michombero dismissed claims that Congolese authorities had fled to Bujumbura or Baraka and called them false. He also alleged that Rwandan troops had crossed into the DRC via the Ruzizi II border post. Meanwhile, M23 sources accused FARDC and its allies of carrying out drone strikes on Twirwaneho positions in Bidegu and Mikenge near Minembwe on 17 March. FARDC later stated on 19 March that 20 M23 fighters had surrendered in Mikenge.

On the diplomatic front, senior military and political officials, along with envoys representing President Félix Tshisekedi and President Paul Kagame, took part in bilateral talks with U.S. officials on 17 March, followed by a trilateral meeting in Washington, D.C., on 18 March. After the discussions, the U.S., the DRC, and Rwanda issued a joint statement announcing that both African countries had agreed to undertake "a series of coordinated steps" to reduce tensions and improve conditions on the ground. The U.S. urged both sides to fully implement the military plan outlined in the U.S.-brokered framework by the end of 2026, with an initial evaluation scheduled before 15 April. Washington also called on the DRC to neutralize the FDLR and on Rwanda to withdraw its troops and equipment. Six operational zones were identified for anti-FDLR operations, five located in M23-controlled areas and one in a government-controlled zone. During the 18 March trilateral meeting, Massad Boulos warned that the U.S. could impose sanctions on either party if they failed to honor their commitments. Meanwhile, on 17 March, Bruno Lemarquis, the UN humanitarian coordinator and acting head of the UN mission in the DRC, met with Corneille Nangaa in Goma to address the humanitarian crisis in eastern DRC, following his condemnation of 11 March drone strikes on the city.

=== 21– 31 March ===
On 22 March, Wazalendo attacked M23 in Kanune village, located roughly 19 miles west of Kanyabayonga in Rutshuru Territory, within the Ikobo groupement of eastern Walikale Territory, before withdrawing afterward. The next day, March 23, FARDC–Wazalendo forces repelled an M23 assault on their positions in Kazinga village. In Walikale Territory, Wazalendo also blocked an M23 maneuver aimed at outflanking FARDC-Wazalendo positions along the RP529 and advancing toward Mungazi village, which is situated about seven miles west of M23's frontline in Kibati and 21 miles west of Nyabiondo in Masisi Territory. Between 23–24 March, M23 unilaterally pulled back troops and equipment from over a dozen frontline positions in northern Lubero Territory, including Kipese, around eight miles southeast of Lubero town, although it retained its forward base in Katondi on the RN2, about 10 miles south of Lubero. Despite the withdrawal, some M23 forces continued to move further south. On 26 March, M23 withdrew from multiple locations in Walikale Territory, including Minjenje, Mpeti, and Kanune. Clashes resumed on 27 March, when M23 fought Wazalendo and regained control of two villages in the Katoyi sector, including Mitimingi in southern Masisi Territory, roughly 26 miles southwest of Rubaya. On 28 March, M23 withdrew from Pitakongo and Bunyatenge in Lubero Territory; Bunyatenge is a remote gold-mining village about 17 miles west of Bingi. After these withdrawals, officials appointed by M23 reportedly fled, and Wazalendo fighters reoccupied several villages. In Walikale Territory, M23 repelled a Wazalendo attack in Ihula village.

On 29 March, M23 attacked again and recaptured three villages in the Nyamaboko groupement, including Mukohwa, while FARDC and Wazalendo forces repelled separate M23 assaults in Ngululu and Kazinga. Wazalendo also regained control of Mpeti along RP1030 after M23's withdrawal. That day, FARDC Deputy Chief of Staff General Jacques Ychaligonza announced deployment to Kisangani to begin operations against the FDLR to disarm them voluntarily or by force. He stated that three battalions had been mobilized to track and neutralize FDLR fighters, who would be detained in Kisangani before being repatriated to Rwanda. Diplomatically, the Doha peace process is expected to move to Switzerland in April 2026, where talks between the Congolese government and M23 are set to resume. On 25 March, Foreign Minister Thérèse Kayikwamba Wagner noted that the process had stalled, partly due to Qatar's limitations in hosting talks amid the Middle East conflicts.

== April 2026 ==
=== 1–12 April ===
On 1 April, Wazalendo forces repelled M23 attacks in several villages west of Uvira, including Mitamba, about 15 miles away. In Masisi Territory, clashes also appeared in Kashovu village, approximately 26 miles southwest of Rubaya. On 3 April, FARDC-Wazalendo forces assumed joint control of villages such as Ndumbi, Buma, Iteya, Buhaya, Mpeti, and Minjenje in Walikale Territory, after M23 fighters vacated the area without any fighting. The M23 front line was later reported to have repositioned in Malemo near Kalembe in Masisi Territory. Between 6–8 April, M23 launched attacks in Kalehe Territory and seized Tushunguti, Kaziba, Katale, Kafufula, Katanga, Mpanama, Braza, Bushege, and Lulamba after clashes with FARDC forces in the Ziralo groupement and with local armed groups such as COPACO led by Kirikicho Mirimba Mwanamayi, MCDPIN under Grevisse Nsimparingira, and forces linked to Haguma Kanyengwenye. Tushunguti lies roughly 18 miles west of Numbi, which is a mineral trading hub near the RN2. Between 9–10 April, FARDC forces counterattacked and retook several villages, including Tushunguti, while Wazalendo also engaged M23 in a nearby village bordering Ziralo in the Ufamandu groupement, Bahunde Chiefdom, Masisi Territory, on 9 April. On 11 April, Twirwaneho fighters killed a senior FARDC colonel and five soldiers during fighting near Muranvya in the Bijombo groupement, Uvira Territory, despite Wazalendo having recaptured Muranvya and other villages earlier that month. On 12 April, Tazama RDC reported that Rwanda carried out drone-based airstrikes on Muranvya using a Turkish-made drone, a claim the outlet had first reported earlier in April.

=== 13–17 April ===
On 13 April, talks between the Congolese government and M23 were held near Montreux, Switzerland under the Doha peace process, with the U.S. represented by Massad Boulos, who also met with senior officials from Switzerland and the UN to coordinate peace initiatives. Qatar participated in person at the negotiations, contrary to earlier claims that its involvement would be virtual. The two sides signed a memorandum of understanding concerning the transfer of 2,000–3,000 FARDC soldiers to government control, as well as a second agreement expanding the Expanded Joint Verification Mechanism (EJVM) to include representatives from M23. Discussions subsequently shifted toward humanitarian matters, with the talks concluding around 16–17 April. At the same time, between 11–13 April, Wazalendo forces clashed with M23 and regained control of several villages in the Mubuku groupement, including two in Murangu locality in central Kalehe Territory. On 14 April, SOS Médias Burundi reported that the FDNB had deployed additional troops to Baraka via Rumonge port on Lake Tanganyika, with movements reportedly directed toward the Fizi Territory and Mwenga Territory highlands. Human Rights Watch cited that around 4,000 FDNB troops were operating in those territories. On 15 April, the U.S. urged the DRC and Rwanda to implement their peace commitments during a UN Security Council meeting. US Ambassador to the UN Tammy Bruce called for the immediate withdrawal of Rwandan troops from eastern DRC and for the FARDC to neutralize the FDLR under the June 2025 US-brokered peace agreement. She also warned that the US would consider "all available tools", including possible sanctions, to support the accords. On 17 April, FARDC and Wazalendo reportedly attacked M23 in northern Kalehe Territory, including in Chambombo near the North Kivu border, about 13 miles southwest of the mining hub of Numbi. The fighting came after reports that Wazalendo retook Chambombo and nearby villages from M23 on 13 April amid ongoing clashes in Kalehe Territory since late March.

=== 18–27 April ===
On 18 April, the South Kivu provincial administration appointed by Kinshasa accused the RDF of recently sending personnel from Rwanda to construct a military installation in Mumosho, Kabare Territory. Meanwhile, clashes between Wazalendo fighters and M23 were reported in three villages in the northern Kalehe Territory, including Chambombo. On 19 April, Wazalendo forces were reported to have used drones to strike three locations near Minembwe, including Mikenge and Point Zéro. Between 19–20 April and again on 22 April, media outlets aligned with the Congolese government alleged that the RDF carried out multiple drone attacks against civilians near Minembwe using Turkish-made TB2 drones launched from Rwanda and had also deployed a helicopter to the area. FARDC subsequently reportedly conducted drone strikes on central Minembwe on 22 April. In Masisi Territory, fighting erupted in Mitimingi village in Katoyi sector, where M23 and Wazalendo forces exchanged attacks between 19 and 20 April. According to Wazalendo accounts, M23 captured a nearby settlement and advanced toward Mitimingi around 19 April, which then led to counterattacks by Wazalendo fighters and FARDC drone operations against M23 positions the following day. M23 subsequently captured Mitimingi on 21 April. FARDC also carried out an airstrike against an M23-held position in Kibati village on the same date. On 27 April, FARDC claimed it had downed an M23 drone over Point Zéro near Minembwe on 25 April and alleged that the aircraft had originated from Rwanda.

== May 2026 ==
=== 1–6 May ===
On 1–2 May, M23 launched attacks against Wazalendo fighters in several villages across the Ziralo groupement in northern Kalehe Territory. Other fighting happened on 2 May in three villages of the Bugorhe groupement in Kabare Territory, including Mulangala, as well as in a village within the Mudaka groupement. M23 reportedly captured Tushunguti in the Ziralo area on 3 May. Fighting continued through 4–5 May, when FARDC and Wazalendo forces reportedly recaptured part of the area and used drones to strike M23 positions, including locations in Lumbishi between Ziralo and Numbi. One of the reported targets was a ground-based anti-aircraft system positioned on a hill near Lumbishi. Wazalendo fighters then mounted counteroffensives on 5–6 May aimed at retaking Tushunguti. On 5 May in Masisi Territory, M23 attacked Wazalendo positions in Remeka and Katuunda villages in the Ufamandu groupement, but the assaults were reportedly repelled. On 6 May, Wazalendo fighters reportedly launched an attack against M23 in the Kigurwe village in Uvira Territory, near the Burundi border and east of Sange. M23 forces reportedly defeated the assault and killed several Wazalendo combatants, including a senior commander.

=== 9–23 May ===
On 9 May, M23 unilaterally withdrew from the Ruzizi Plain. Reports indicated that thousands of their fighters moved north from more than a dozen localities along a 20-mile section of the RN5 highway and the surrounding western hills. By 11 May, FARDC and Wazalendo forces had reoccupied Sange, which had served as M23's main forward position on the RN5 after its withdrawal from Uvira following the December 2025 offensive, along with several other abandoned localities. M23 reportedly regrouped in Katogota village. Between 7 and 9 May, FARDC carried out drone strikes on Kakenge, Ilundu, and other villages around Minembwe. On 12 May, FARDC and Wazalendo reinforcements were sent to Mikenge and Kipupu. The next day, Twirwaneho fighters launched attacks against Wazalendo positions in Kalingi, Kakenge, and Bidegu. On 15 May, FDNB reinforced the Congolese government by deploying two additional battalions, totaling up to 1,300 troops, to South Kivu. The troops arrived near Uvira by boat before advancing toward Bijombo and the Itombwe highlands in Uvira Territory and Mwenga Territory.

Wazalendo fighters reportedly expelled M23 from a village near Kashebere in neighboring Walikale Territory during fighting on 15 and 16 May. On 18–19 May, FARDC and pro-government media claimed that three attack drones operated by the Rwandan army were intercepted over Kalonge 2 and Point Zéro. FARDC also alleged that M23 coalition forces bombarded several highland areas, including Mikenge, while using drones against government positions in Kalingi and Point Zéro on 20 May. During the fighting that day, Twirwaneho fighters reportedly killed at least 15 FARDC soldiers around Mikenge and Point Zéro. On 21 May, the self-proclaimed General Mutayomba, one of the Wazalendo commanders, was reportedly injured during fighting in Luke, Masisi Territory. In the Kavumu area, clashes between Wazalendo and M23 were reported in Mbayo and Tshivanga villages near the Kahuzi-Biéga National Park (PNKB) on 18 May, before fighting resumed in Mbayo on 21 May.

=== 24–31 May ===
On 24 May, FARDC or Congolese government-contracted private military contractors reportedly launched a drone strike on a conservation facility near the Rumangabo military base in Rutshuru Territory using either a MALE combat drone or a one-way attack drone. FARDC followed with drone strikes on Bidegu, Kalingi, Kakenge, and Kalonge on 25 May. Two days later, pro-government media reported that FARDC deployed drones equipped with loudspeakers around Minembwe to broadcast messages to opposing fighters. That same day, Wazalendo fighters reportedly launched an assault on M23 positions in Nyabiondo and temporarily occupied the town. Other fighting was reported on 27 and 28 May in Misambo village, situated in Bukumbirwa locality near Rusamambu in Ikobo. On 29 May, Wazalendo fighters withdrew from Luola village in Kisimba's Banakindi locality after M23 launched drone strikes against their positions from Ihula. Wazalendo fighters later reportedly ambushed M23 forces in Lusuli village in Rutshuru Territory, east of Kisimba. Also on 29 May, tensions around Rubaya eased into a fragile calm after clashes between M23 and Wazalendo forces, with M23 retaining Runigi, Kasenyi, Kanyaru, Nyakigano, and Katobotobo, while Wazalendo continued to hold Katoyi. On 30 May, Wazalendo reportedly attacked M23 on a local road between Burora and Loashi villages, but the M23 rebels continued advancing around Rubaya, and dislodged Wazalendo fighters to recapture at least three villages, Luke, Mulema, and Ndete in the southern Osso Banyungu sector northwest of the town. FARDC and Wazalendo fighters reportedly began an offensive against M23 on 31 May and 1 June to recover the villages of Buhimba and Kibati near the RP529.

== June 2026 ==
=== 1–4 June ===
On 1 June, M23 and Wazalendo forces clashed near Lukananda village, north of Bukavu and close to the PNKB, about six miles south of Kavumu Airport. The Institut Congolais pour la Conservation de la Nature (ICCN), which manages the PNKB, stated that Wazalendo fighters killed a park ranger during an incursion into the park on 31 May. On 2 June, FARDC and Wazalendo forces reportedly regained control of Buhimba. The same day, M23 drove Wazalendo from Lushebere village, about three miles northeast of Ndete, after Wazalendo reportedly killed one M23 fighter and two civilians in an earlier attack. Wazalendo forces also withdrew from Kalembe on 2 June to an undisclosed location. Also on 2 June, the US Treasury Department announced sanctions against M23 intelligence chief John Imani Nzenze and FDLR intelligence and special operations commander Gustave Kubwayo, who oversees intelligence and special operations. Treasury Secretary Scott Bessent said the sanctions were designed to reinforce the Washington Accords and support efforts toward a peaceful settlement. Between 2 and 3 June, FARDC, Wazalendo, and FDNB troops reportedly fought Twirwaneho fighters in several villages around Minembwe, including Kakenge and Bidegu. Speaking before the US House Foreign Affairs Committee on 3 June, Secretary of State Marco Rubio said implementation of the Washington Accords was underway and that the U.S. expected Rwanda to withdraw its forces from eastern DRC by mid-July. He also stated that resolving the "M23 problem" remained a priority. On 4 June, FARDC and Wazalendo forces withdrew from Kibati and retreated west along the RP529 toward Mungazi.

=== 5–12 June ===
From 2 to 5 June, Twirwaneho fighters fought FARDC and FDNB forces in several villages surrounding Minembwe in the highlands. The fighting spread to Ilundu during the night of 6–7 June. On 7 June, local authorities and civil society groups reported that a drone attack in Ilundu killed two civilians and wounded several others. On 8 June, Twirwaneho reportedly seized Mikenge village, about 15 miles north of Minembwe, after clashes with DRC coalition forces. Elsewhere that day, M23 and FARDC exchanged fire in Bushwira, Mbiza, and another village in southern Kabare Territory, while additional clashes happened in two villages of the nearby Mudaka groupement. Between 8 and 9 June, Twirwaneho clashed with FARDC and FDNB in Kakenge, Bidegu, Kalingi, and other villages around Minembwe. During the same period, M23 and FARDC also clashed in several villages across the Bugorhe groupement in Kabare Territory. On 9 June, M23 fought Wazalendo forces farther south near Kavumu, including in Kamakombe and Mbayo villages. FARDC stated on 10 June that it had retaken Mikenge during a counteroffensive and had also captured Kakenge and Kalingi from opposing forces. On 12 June, SOS Médias Burundi reported claims from unverified Congolese security sources that Kinshasa had offered Burundi gold mining-related incentives in Minembwe and other parts of Fizi Territory in return for stronger military support against Twirwaneho. The report also alleged that FARDC had provided FDNB troops with drones to support operations in the highlands.

Several areas of Masisi Territory saw renewed fighting between M23 and pro-government forces. On 9 June, FARDC and Wazalendo fighters reportedly launched an ambush against M23 and took control of Kawele village. M23 also attacked Wazalendo positions in Kazinga village, approximately 13 miles west of Masisi. On 9 and 10 June, M23 and FARDC-Wazalendo forces fought in Kasenyi village in the Kibabi groupement. During the same two-day period, clashes were also reported in Katoyi, Kashovu, and Kishanja villages within the Ufamandu groupement. On 11 June, M23 reportedly used drones during an attack on Wazalendo positions in Bibwe village, further north in Masisi Territory.

=== 13–19 June ===
On 13 June, Wazalendo fighters reportedly repelled an M23 attack on Buhimba village, about 11 miles west of Nyabiondo in Walikale Territory. Later that day, M23 reportedly carried out drone strikes against Wazalendo positions in Kinyumba and Lwibo villages, located roughly three and five miles north of Nyabiondo along a local road. Wazalendo fighters also reportedly repelled another M23 attack in two villages within the Banakindi locality of the Kisimba groupement. On 15 June, pro-Congolese government media reported on social media that DRC coalition forces had taken control of Minembwe center and other nearby positions after fighting Twirwaneho and allied pro-M23 forces. These reports were denied by M23-aligned media, while several pro-government sources stated that coalition troops had not yet reached the town center between 15 and 17 June because fighting was still ongoing. On 17 June, the FARDC regional spokesperson claimed that government forces had seized the nearby villages of Ilundu, Kitavi, and Madegu on 16 June and were continuing operations to retake Minembwe airfield. The coalition offensive advanced along three routes: one led by FARDC-Wazalendo forces, another by FARDC special forces, including the Owl and Black Snake units, and a third by FDNB-FDLR forces. On 18 June, coalition forces reportedly continued aerial attacks and efforts to regain the airfield. Twirwaneho insisted that it still controlled Minembwe, while M23-aligned sources maintained that neither side had full control of the area. Pro-government sources also alleged that Rwanda deployed four Turkish-made TB2 medium-altitude long-endurance drones to conduct bombing missions over Minembwe and nearby villages between 16 and 19 June.

=== 19–23 June ===
On 19 June, Twirwaneho reportedly began a counteroffensive around Minembwe, holding onto the town center while driving back Wazalendo fighters and reclaiming several surrounding positions. Fighting also happened between 19 and 20 June when M23 reportedly clashed with a coalition of Wazalendo groups near Bibatama village in Kibabi groupement, southern Masisi Territory. Social media videos circulated on 20 June that allegedly showed Twirwaneho military commander Charles Sematama in Minembwe. According to unverified reports cited by Burundian media on 21 June, FDNB forces abandoned military equipment and withdrew from Kakenge village after the offensive collapsed. Wazalendo forces denied separate claims that Twirwaneho had seized or wounded two FARDC colonels during its counteroffensive. A pro-Congolese government source, believed to be affiliated with FARDC, claimed on social media that the coalition offensive failed because of insufficient sustained air support as Twirwaneho launched its counterattack. On 21 June, Twirwaneho reportedly regained at least one position near Kakenge after clashes with Wazalendo fighters. Reports also alleged that Rwanda had recently supplied Twirwaneho with ammunition, military equipment, and drones used to strike pro-Wazalendo positions around Minembwe. Also on 21 June, M23 reportedly clashed with FARDC and Wazalendo forces in Kashaka village in Luindi Chiefdom. On 22 June, clashes between Twirwaneho and Wazalendo fighters resumed near the villages of Kalingi and Ilundu around Minembwe. That day, President Tshisekedi received Burundian President Évariste Ndayishimiye at N'djili Airport, and the two leaders held closed-door discussions on 22 and 23 June before addressing the media together on 23 June. Tshisekedi's office said their talks focused on the security situation in eastern DRC and the Ebola outbreak. Ndayishimiye called for unity in confronting a "common enemy", while Tshisekedi announced that he would soon travel to the Ituri province to evaluate the Ebola response. On 23 June, M23-aligned drones reportedly attacked areas around Minembwe.

=== 24–29 June ===
Clashes between Twirwaneho and Wazalendo resumed on a hill near the town on 24 June, and FARDC special forces were deployed to Kashaka in Luindi Chiefdom to support operations against M23. Reports from 24 and 25 June indicated that drones linked to M23 targeted pro-government positions around Minembwe. One social media report further alleged that an aircraft flying from an airport in southwestern Rwanda delivered supplies to M23-aligned forces through the Minembwe airfield on 24 June. Wazalendo fighters reportedly responded with drone attacks on Twirwaneho positions in Ilundu and around the airfield. On 25 June, FARDC "Black Snake" special forces and Wazalendo fighters reportedly regained Kalingi, Kawera, Kitavi, and several other positions from Twirwaneho. Also on 25 June, M23 reportedly repelled an attack on Loashi village, located about four miles north of Masisi. The US Treasury Department announced sanctions against Gasabo Gold Refinery LTD, its chairman Jean Malic Kalima, general manager Bosco Kayobotsi, and three mining companies controlled by Kalima — Bugambira Mines LTD, Wolfram Mining and Processing LTD, and Rwinkwavu Mining Corporation LTD — for allegedly facilitating the smuggling of gold and other minerals from eastern DRC into Rwanda. Treasury and State Department officials said the measures supported implementation of the Washington Accords framework. Meanwhile, analyst Rich Tedd reported that a Moldova-based cargo aircraft flew twice from Al Reef Airbase in Abu Dhabi to Kinshasa on 25 and 26 June, possibly transporting military cargo for FARDC.

FARDC and Wazalendo fighters reportedly began an offensive against M23 near Ngungu and across the Kibabi II groupement in southern Masisi Territory on 26 June. By the next day, they had taken control of Kasake village, although fighting continued in the surrounding area and near Kibabi for another two days. Wazalendo forces reportedly engaged M23 around Luke and Kasenyi and claimed to have captured Kawere and Kanyaru. On 27 June, Wazalendo also launched attacks around Lumbishi and Chambombo in Kalehe Territory, reportedly taking several M23 positions. On 28 June, a journalist with Radio Maendeleo reported that a combat drone targeted FARDC-Wazalendo positions at Point Zéro. Wazalendo forces separately reportedly prevented M23 from advancing near Kalinga village in Masisi Territory. On 29 June, M23 pushed Wazalendo fighters out of positions near Ziralo groupement and Lumbishi as clashes persisted in northern Kalehe Territory. On 30 June, Twirwaneho reportedly used a drone to attack a camp occupied by Burundian military personnel in Baraka's Mushimbakye quartier. A possibly separate strike, attributed to Twirwaneho and the RDF, reportedly targeted Baraka airfield and FARDC helicopters stationed in the area. Twirwaneho claimed that two helicopters were destroyed, but pro-government sources disputed the account, saying the drones failed to hit their targets and crashed near the airfield. That day, M23 counterattacked Wazalendo forces and retook Chambombo, south of Lumbishi.

== July 2026 ==
=== 1–3 July ===
On 1 July, Twirwaneho reportedly recaptured Mikenge, Tuwetuwe, and Bilalombili after forcing FARDC and Wazalendo fighters to withdraw, with RDF drones allegedly supporting the operation. Twirwaneho continued advancing on 2 July, capturing another important position near Mikenge and moving south toward Point Zéro. The RDF reportedly reinforced its forces in the highlands and conducted drone strikes against Wazalendo positions near Mikenge, Bilalombili, and Point Zéro. On 3 July, journalist Daniel Michombero reported that FARDC had retaken several positions around Bilalombili. A separate drone attack attributed to M23-aligned forces reportedly struck Mulima village in the Basilotcha groupement near Point Zéro that day. In Masisi Territory, Wazalendo fighters reportedly stopped an M23 attack at Bulende on 1 July. The next day, M23 strengthened its positions with additional troops and military equipment along four routes leading toward Pinga.
