= Battle of Kitshanga =

Battle of Kitshanga may refer to:

- First Battle of Kitshanga
- Second Battle of Kitshanga
