= 2026 Ebola epidemic =

- Healthcare workers prepare to bury an infant

- Confirmed cases as of 12 November 2026
- Disease: Ebola
- Pathogen: Bundibugyo virus (BDBV)
- Location: Democratic Republic of the Congo, Uganda, France, Kenya, and Nigeria
- WHO status: Public health emergency of international concern
- First reported: 14 May 2026
- Confirmed cases: 11,711
- Suspected cases: 368
- Hospitalised cases: 1,722
- Recovered: 3,217
- Deaths: 5,719
- Fatality rate: 48.8%

The 2026 Ebola epidemic is an outbreak of the Ebola virus disease (EVD) mainly in the eastern Democratic Republic of the Congo (DRC) and neighbouring countries. Initial cases were reported on 14 May 2026 in the Ituri Province. It is the 17th Ebola outbreak in the DRC and began five months after the end of the previous outbreak. Early infections are theorised to have occurred in January or February 2026 in the town of Mongbwalu. By early August, it had become the fastest growing Ebola outbreak on record, as well as the second largest.

It is caused by the Bundibugyo ebolavirus (BDBV) pathogen, which has complicated efforts as existing treatments and vaccines are for the Zaire ebolavirus. The outbreak was declared a public health emergency of international concern (PHEIC) by the World Health Organization (WHO) on 16 May 2026.

There have been 5,715 confirmed deaths in the DRC, 2 in Uganda and 2 in Kenya, as of the third week of November. Poor health infrastructure and ongoing armed conflicts in the region hinder detection, treatment, and prevention; it is considered likely that the true scale of the outbreak exceeds the confirmed numbers, stressing a preexisting severe humanitarian crisis. This added instability provided a situation ripe for rebel groups to capitalise on.

The outbreak has spread beyond Ituri to seven more provinces in the DRC. Cases were also reported in Uganda's capital of Kampala, in France (following the return of a health worker on a humanitarian mission), in Kenya and in Nigeria. (Note: Place of diagnosis. Any subsequent relocation or medical evacuation of patient is described in the body of the article.)

== Background ==
There have been 16 known previous outbreaks of Ebola in the DRC. There have been two previous outbreaks of Bundibugyo virus, one in the Bundibugyo District of Uganda in 2007 and 2008, from which it got its name, and another in 2012 in Isiro, DRC.

=== Regional issues ===
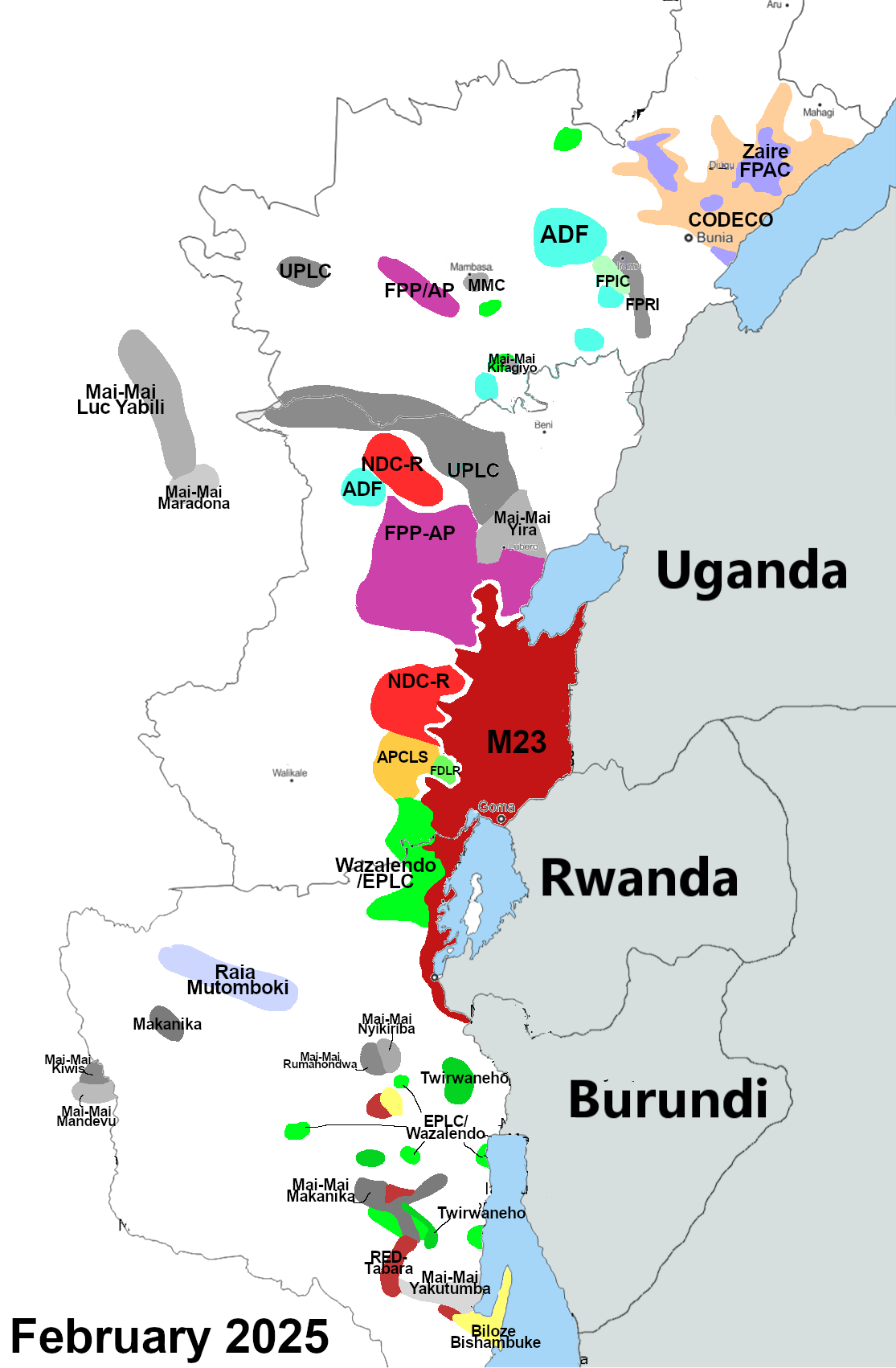
A map of the armed groups operating in Ituri and Kivu provinces

The outbreak began in Ituri, a province of eastern DRC with a long history of ethnic conflict. The area is rich in valuable metals including gold, tin, tungsten and tantalum, which are predominantly extracted by small scale artisan mining. Armed groups such as the Islamic State-aligned Allied Democratic Forces (ADF-Baluku), the Cooperative for Development of the Congo (CODECO), and the Rwanda-backed March 23 Movement (M23)—the last of which belongs to the rebel group coalition, the Congo River Alliance (Alliance Fleuve Congo, AFC)—struggle for control of mining areas. Fighting and restrictions by armed groups restricts humanitarian access, obstructs aid operations, curtails civilian movement and limits access to essential services.

Large-scale refugee movements and cross-border travel, as well as mining-related travel, complicate contact tracing. Ituri's status as a commercial and migratory hub greatly increases the risk of diseases spreading to the broader region.

=== Culture and misinformation ===
Traditional burial rituals in the region often span several days. They may involve washing and dressing the corpse, returning it to ancestral land, and touching it as part of the interment ceremony; these practices put mourners at risk of infection. In contrast, safe burial practices require that the body be immediately placed in a sealed bag and transported to a designated burial site. This potentially places health workers in conflict with cultural tradition.

There have been several attacks on health workers, particularly those involved with burials, fuelled by misinformation about the disease and the motives driving the humanitarian response. Conspiracy theories also circulated on WhatsApp. For example, in late May 2026, a crowd at a hospital in Mongbwalu demanded the return of bodies for traditional burial and set fire to a tent used by Médecins Sans Frontières (MSF), prompting the organisation to withdraw its staff; during the unrest, 18 suspected Ebola patients absconded the hospital. A May 2026 survey by ActionAid in three health zones in Ituri found that only 64% of respondents believed Ebola was real and not caused by spiritual or mystical forces. Rumours included claims that the disease had been invented for financial gain, that health workers were spreading the virus, and that alcohol could provide immunity. On 23 October a spontaneous deadly attack against a health worker happened in the health region Bafwasende in the province of Tshopo. Angry youths attacked the health worker with a machete after accusations of spreading Ebola by contaminating water.

== Epidemiology ==
Statistics by country as of 19 November
Country	Suspected cases	Confirmed cases				Source
Country	Suspected cases	Cases	Deaths	CFR (%)	Recovered	Source
Democratic Republic of the Congo	368	11,680	5,715	48.9%	3,190	
Kenya	—	9	2	22.2%	7	
Uganda	—	20	2	10%	18	
Nigeria	—	1	0	0%	1	
France	—	1	0	0%	1	
Total	368	11,711	5,719	48.8%	3,217	

=== Democratic Republic of the Congo ===
Epidemic in DRC
Confirmed cases by health zone in the DRC as of 15 October 2026

Trends in DRC, 1 October 2026. Source: Brown University School of Public Health

Statistics by provinces of the DRC as of 19 November
Province	Suspected	Cases	Deaths	CFR (%)
Ituri	131	7,979	3,770	47.2%
North Kivu	170	3,024	1,672	55.3%
Haut-Uélé	19	540	231	42.8%
Tshopo	18	109	35	32.1%
Bas-Uélé	13	13	4	30.8%
North Ubangi	12	10	1	10.0%
South Kivu	ND	3	1	33.3%
South Ubangi	5	2	1	50.0%
Total	368	11,680	5,715	48.9%

The Congolese Ministry of Public Health, Hygiene, and Social Welfare publicly confirmed an outbreak of Ebola virus disease in Ituri Province on 15 May.

As of 18 October 2026, the DRC has seen cases in 67 health zones across the eight affected provinces. With 28 of 36 in Ituri, 17 of 34 in North Kivu, 1 of 3 in South Kivu, 7 of 13 in Haut-Uélé, 7 of 23 in Tshopo, 4 of 11 in Bas-Uélé, 1 of 16 in Sud-Ubangi and 2 of 11 Nord-Ubangi reporting cases.

==== Confirmed cases and deaths landmarks ====
Cases Landmarks
Cases	Landmark date	Time since previous landmark (days)	Source
1,000	20 June 2026	—	
2,000	13 July 2026	23	
3,000	24 July 2026	11	
4,000	7 August 2026	14	
5,000	17 August 2026	10	
6,000	30 August 2026	13	
7,000	11 September 2026	12	
8,000	27 September 2026	16	
9,000	10 October 2026	13	
10,000	25 October 2026	15	
11,000	8 November 2026	14	

Deaths Landmarks
Deaths	Landmark date	Time since previous landmark (days)	Source
1,000	21 July 2026	—	
2,000	9 August 2026	19	
3,000	31 August 2026	22	
4,000	2 October 2026	32	
5,000	29 October 2026	27	

=== Uganda ===
Uganda declared an outbreak of Ebola on 15 May.

On 27 May, Uganda closed its borders with DRC for at least four weeks after it reported seven cases and a death. Anyone entering Uganda from DRC was also to be isolated for 21 days. Ugandan authorities implemented a preparedness plan and activated an Ebola treatment centre which was on standby at Mulago hospital. The first two cases were moved to the treatment centre; subsequent cases came direct to the hospital. An estimated 6,000 contacts were isolated for an incubation period of 21 days. On 16 July, Uganda discharged its last Ebola patient from hospital, leaving no confirmed active cases in the country. On 28 July 2026 Uganda declared the end of the outbreak after completing a 42-day period with no new cases; the WHO certified the declaration on 26 August. Overall, Uganda recorded 20 confirmed cases (fifteen of whom were people who had travelled from DRC) and two deaths.

=== France ===
On 24 June, France confirmed its first case after a doctor who had been in the DRC on a humanitarian mission returned.

=== Germany ===
Two people were medically evacuated to Germany; one arrived in July, while another one was discharged earlier (June), from a German hospital; both were American humanitarian workers with Ebola flown in from the DRC.

=== Netherlands ===
On 1 October 2026, a staff member of Médecins sans Frontières who had been working on the Ebola response in DRC had tested positive for Bundibugyo virus and was medically evacuated to the Netherlands for specialist treatment.

=== Kenya ===
On 6 October, Kenya confirmed its first ever Ebola case and death in a Kenyan citizen who had been resident in the DRC. The person had travelled by road from DRC to Uganda, and boarded a flight from Entebbe to Nairobi. They tested positive for Bundibugyo ebolavirus. Further cases involved close contacts of the first.

=== Nigeria ===
On 20 October, Nigeria confirmed its first Ebola case, the wife of a Swiss diplomat who had flown to Abuja, Nigeria from Entebbe, Uganda. She began showing symptoms on 7 October and was transferred to a private hospital on 11 October with an initial diagnosis of malaria. Ebola was diagnosed on 19 October. On 26 October, after her condition improved, she was medically evacuated to Switzerland.

This person had been holidaying in Uganda and had not visited DRC, sparking concern over how and where she may have acquired the infection. Genomic analysis has revealed that her infection was closely related to the first case in Kenya, leading to speculation that the two may have crossed paths while in Uganda.

=== Switzerland ===
On 26 October, the first case in Nigeria was medically evacuated to Switzerland as she was the wife of a Swiss diplomat.

=== Britain ===
In early November, a British health worker who had become infected in DRC was scheduled for evacuation to specialist treatment facilities in the UK after being tested positive for Ebola. He arrived at the Royal Free Hospital in London for treatment on 5 November.

=== Deaths ===
Early in the epidemic, the case fatality rate (CFR) was provisionally estimated as low as 10% to 20%. However, as of 31 October 2026, the CFR was confirmed to now be as high as 48.8%.

== Bundibugyo virus disease ==
=== Symptoms ===
The most common symptoms are similar to EBOV disease due to Zaire ebolavirus: fever, diarrhoea and vomiting, headache, difficulty breathing and swallowing, and muscle and joint pain. However a study of BDBV patients in the current outbreak found that bleeding, a common feature of EBOV infection, occurred in relatively few (approximately 10%). The lack of bleeding has made it difficult to diagnose BDBV from symptoms alone, and made it less likely that people will be isolated or taken to hospital, thus contributing to the spread of disease.

=== Cause ===
Ebola viruses regularly spread in Central and West Africa. Bats are often reservoir hosts, although this has not been confirmed for this species of the virus. The virus can infect mammals that prey on bats and can be transmitted to humans through contact with infected bats, carcasses, or bushmeat. The virus is transmitted between humans through close, direct contact with the bodily fluids of a sick or dead person; this places the close family of an infected person and health workers at particular risk.

BDBV virus appears to replicate more slowly in vitro than the more common Zaire ebolavirus (EBOV). The strain of BDBV which is causing this outbreak is distinct from the strains which caused previous outbreaks; a study was commissioned in August 2026 to investigate whether viral evolution, which may facilitate transmission or increase severity of the disease, may explain the unprecedented scale of this outbreak.

=== Diagnosis ===
Early symptoms are non-specific, such as fever, aching, headache, weakness and fatigue, sore throat, loss of appetite. Other diseases common in the affected area, such as malaria and typhoid fever, can appear similar.

On 22 May 2026, Africa Centres for Disease Control and Prevention recommended molecular diagnostic testing (using real-time PCR) for identifying the Bundibugyo ebolavirus strain, because no antigen rapid diagnostic test (RDT) met WHO TPP specifications for recommendation during the outbreak response. As of 25 August 2026, a reliable test is only available in hospitals.

== Medical countermeasures ==
At the start of the epidemic, there was no approved vaccine or medicine specifically for Bundibugyo virus. As of November 2026 the situation has not changed, although a number of drugs and vaccines are undergoing clinical trials.

Progress with medical countermeasures
Product	Sponsor or manufacturer	Type	Stage in development
Ervebo	International Coordinating Group on Vaccine Provision	Vaccine	Phase 3 clinical trial started 31 July 2026. Additionally included in Tumaini trial (see below).
rVSV-based vaccine	IAVI	Vaccine	This is the same vaccine platform as Ervebo, which has been adapted to BDBV.
mRNA-1469	Moderna	Vaccine	Phase 1 clinical trial commenced 04/08/2026Approved for inclusion in Phase 2/3 Tumaini trial.
ChAdOx1-BDBV-GP	University of Oxford	Vaccine	Clinical trials in progress - Phase 1a (24/07/2026) and Phase 1b (06/10/2026). Approved for inclusion in Phase 2/3 Tumaini trial.
MVA-CR19	Minapharm Group	Vaccine	
Remdesivir	WHO	Antiviral	Randomised adaptive trial started 02/07/2026
MBP-134	WHO	Antiviral	Randomised adaptive trial started 02/07/2026
Obeldesivir	Gilead	Post-exposure prophylaxis	Clinical trial started 14/07/2026

=== Vaccines ===
A study involving macaques suggests that the vaccine for Zaire ebolavirus, rVSV-ZEBOV vaccine (Ervebo), may be partially effective; though the WHO initially judged this evidence insufficient and has recommended against its use in the current outbreak. On 31 July, on consideration of new evidence, the WHO Technical Advisory Group authorised a Phase 3 clinical trial of rVSV-ZEBOV vaccine to take place in the DRC. As of 6 September 2026, that vaccine had been administered to 2,007 healthcare and frontline workers.

For prevention, the WHO selected three other potential vaccines to be expedited; these were candidates under development by IAVI, Moderna, and the University of Oxford. On 1 June 2026, the Coalition for Epidemic Preparedness Innovations (CEPI) announced funding to fast-track the three vaccine candidates. Funding allocated was IAVI ($3.2 million), Moderna ($50 million), and the University of Oxford ($8.6 million).

Subsequently, on 27 August, CEPI announced funding of $16.5 million to the Minapharm Group for development of a candidate vaccine based on the modified vaccinia Ankara (MVA) vaccine platform. On October 28, a consortium led by IAVI was awarded a further $36 million from the US Biomedical Advanced Research and Development Authority for further development of their vaccine candidate.

==== Tumaini clinical trial (Note: Tumaini* is the Swahili word for "hope".) ====
This is a combined phase 2/3 adaptive clinical trial of promising vaccine candidates, registered as NCT07842107, and developed as a collaboration between:

- Coalition for Epidemic Preparedness Innovations (CEPI)
- Institut National de Recherche Biomédicale (INRB)
- University of Antwerp (Global Health Institute)
- DRC Ministry of Health
- Africa CDC
- WHO
- Médecins Sans Frontières
- Institute of Tropical Medicine Antwerp (ITM)

The trial was launched on 23 October. The protocol involves ring vaccination of known contacts of BDVD cases. Unusually, the protocol allows pregnant and lactating women to be included. As of 6 November, three candidate vaccines have been approved for inclusion; Ervebo, ChAdOx1-BDBV-GP, and mRNA-1469.

=== Treatments ===
On 28 May 2026, the WHO recommended several candidate treatments for clinical trials. The drugs to be trialled were the antiviral remdesivir and the monoclonal antibody therapies MBP-134 and maftivimab. The WHO-sponsored PARTNERS clinical trial protocol was deployed to test remdesivir and MBP-134 starting in the DRC in July.

== Timeline of the outbreak ==
The outbreak may have started as early as January. Based on models of the spread of Bundibugyo virus, it is estimated that the virus crossed over into humans in January or February, the most plausible time of a spillover event being in mid-to-late February. The outbreak may have started with the funeral of a pastor in Mongbwalu on 4 February. During the funeral, the coffin was broken and the corpse was handled by family members. Though the pastor was never diagnosed with Ebola, nearly 50 others were reported to have died with Ebola-like symptoms following the funeral, including several of his brothers.

=== April ===
The earliest suspected case in Ituri was a man who began experiencing hemorrhagic symptoms on 24 April 2026. Early household transmission occurred when a sibling developed symptoms on 26 April and died the following day. The initial case subsequently died on 28 April.

A potential outbreak signal was reported on 30 April, though initial testing in Bunia was negative for Zaire Ebola and samples were sent to the INRB laboratory in Kinshasa.

=== May ===
On 5 May, the WHO was alerted to the potential Ebola outbreak in Ituri and dispatched a response team. MSF was alerted on 9 and 10 May of suspected viral hemorrhagic fever (VHF) in Mongwalu health zone, similarly dispatching an assessment team; it found that 55 people had died since the beginning of April, receiving during their time there more reported cases in Bunia and Rwampara health zones. On 14 May, the INRB confirmed eight cases of a non-Zaire filovirus aetiology. Genomic sequencing on 15 May classified them as the Bundibugyo ebolavirus species. That same day, Uganda declared an outbreak due to an imported case.

On 15 May, the Congolese Ministry of Public Health, Hygiene, and Social Welfare publicly confirmed the outbreak of Ebola in Ituri Province, including 246 suspected cases. By 16 May, the three health zones of Bunia, Mongwalu and Rwampara in Ituri had confirmed or suspected cases. Cases were confirmed in the Ugandan capital Kampala. The next day, the WHO reported eight laboratory-confirmed cases in Ituri, one confirmed case in Kinshasa, and two confirmed cases in Kampala. Furthermore, given the unusual clusters of suspected cases appearing across multiple parts of the eastern DRC, the WHO was unable to ascertain the geographic spread of the epidemic or the true number of infections. Alongside the cases in Uganda confirming an international risk, this led the WHO to declare the epidemic a public health emergency of international concern. That same day, Congolese authorities said a total of 246 people with suspected cases and over 80 deaths had been reported.

Within days, cases were recorded to have spread to North Kivu—which was confirmed by the AFC/M23, who was primarily in control of the province. The first cases officially recorded were in Goma, North Kivu on 17 May; Butembo, North Kivu on 18 May; and the Nyakunde health zone in Ituri the same day. The first fatalities were recorded in Bukavu, South Kivu on 21 May and Beni, North Kivu on 29 May.

On 17 May, as hospitals in Ituri's capital Bunia became overwhelmed, health authorities in the DRC began establishing field hospitals, which the WHO described as only a "first response". Authorities were working to bring supplies into the region.

On 18 May, the WHO reported that the DRC had 516 suspected cases and 131 deaths, in addition to 33 confirmed cases and four confirmed deaths in four health zones in Ituri and three health zones in North Kivu. Uganda had two confirmed cases and one confirmed death in Kampala.

Around 18 May, an American physician and medical missionary, who had been treating patients at Nyankunde hospital in Ituri, tested positive for Bundibugyo Ebola and developed symptoms. He was evacuated to the Charité Hospital in Berlin, where he was isolated, received antiviral therapy, and recovered.

On 18 May, a group of Ugandans attended a burial in eastern DRC before returning to Uganda. Some developed symptoms of Ebola and were taken to Fort Portal for treatment. On 19 May, the Ugandan government temporarily banned handshakes, hugs, and unnecessary physical contact.

The DR Congo national football team cancelled parts of its pre-2026 FIFA World Cup training camp that was originally scheduled to take place in May in Kinshasa, but the team still travelled to Europe and then Texas before the World Cup.

On 18 May, the European Centre for Disease Prevention and Control announced that it would send experts to the region to assist in managing the response to the epidemic.

On 19 May, as no licensed specific treatment or vaccine existed for Bundibugyo virus disease, the WHO said, "Response strategies will rely heavily on comprehensive public health measures, including supportive care, early case detection, stringent infection prevention and control protocols, rigorous contact tracing, safe burial practices, and deep community engagement".

On 21 May, The Guardian described the US as "notably absent in these efforts", due to the end of USAID, reductions in US health agencies, and cancellation of research by the second Trump administration. The US withdrawal from the WHO had resulted in major reductions in the agency's capabilities.

On 21 May, the UK announced up to £20 million to support communities affected by the Ebola outbreak in eastern DRC. A week later, the US State Department announced $112 million of bilateral assistance aimed at supplying PPE, screening, contact tracing, and diagnostics; the European Union pledged €15 million to support Ebola response and preparedness efforts in the DRC and Uganda.

On 21 May, residents protested in Rwampara, near Bunia, Ituri, after relatives tried to take the body of a young man whom they claimed had died of typhoid fever. Police officers fired warning shots and tear gas to disperse the crowd, and some of the protesters set two tents on fire, in which people were being treated for Ebola by a medical charity. Police and military reinforcements later arrived and restored order.

On 22 May, the WHO upgraded the Ebola risk level in the DRC to "very high", while the regional risk remained "high" and the global risk remained low.

On 23 May, eighteen suspected people with Ebola escaped a treatment centre and returned to the community in Mongbwalu, DRC, after local residents attacked and burned a tent.

On 23 May, the Red Cross announced that three workers who died between 5 and 16 May were believed to have contracted Ebola on 27 March during dead body management activities in Mongbwalu before the outbreak had been identified.

On 29 May the DRC's Ministry of Health updated its total suspect case count to remove suspected cases ruled out after investigation and suspected deaths pending the results of ongoing investigation.

On 30 May, three people confirmed to have Ebola fled treatment centres in Beni, after 20 civilians were killed by Allied Democratic Forces (ADF), a militia affiliated with Islamic State.

=== June ===
On 1 June, five people who had recovered from Ebola were discharged from hospital in the DRC, according to health authorities. On 1 June, a burial team in Bunia were assaulted by residents, injuring four people.

On 1 June, the medical charity MSF announced that it is building a 65-bed Ebola treatment centre in Ituri, as well as supporting health facilities in Bunia. By 16 June, MSF had three treatment centres in operation, in Bunia, Goma, and Mongbwalu.

On 2 June, the WHO announced that only 116 cases out of 906 were still suspected following additional testing.

On 2 June, the International Rescue Committee warned that the outbreak was "likely far worse" than official figures suggested. They estimated that only 20% of the contacts in the contact tracing process were being located. They reported that people were avoiding health facilities, with many people with Ebola choosing to stay in the community.

On 2 June, two people were killed in protests against a proposed Ebola quarantine facility for US citizens at Laikipia Air Base outside of Nanyuki, Kenya. Kenya's High Court had temporarily stopped construction of the facility, but the government vowed to continue. On 9 June, another protester was killed.

On 4 June, an Ebola burial team was attacked in Katana, South Kivu province, by residents who took possession of the body. Katana is located between the cities of Bukavu and Goma and is controlled by Congo River Alliance/M23 rebels.

On 4 June, eleven Ebola patients fled isolation facilities in Ituri.

On 17 June, a burial team was attacked in the Mongbwalu health zone, Ituri. Five health workers were taken hostage after being falsely accused of spreading Ebola.

Fatalities were recorded to have occurred within the Haut-Uélé Province on 29 June and Kisangani, Tshopo on 30 June (with the death occurring on 27 June following infection on 18 June).

On 19 June, World Food Programme staff reported that some patients had been fleeing treatment facilities in search of food. The DRC government reported more than 150 patient escapes from facilities since late May, for multiple reasons.

On 24 June, France confirmed its first case after a doctor returned from a humanitarian mission in the DRC.

27 September: Marie-Celestin Karondwa, senior member of the DRC’s ruling party, was beaten to death and his house burnt after he appeared a radio program in which he promoted preventative measures against the disease. The perpetrators and their motives are unknown.

=== July ===
On 11 July, the United States (US) confirmed a US citizen who had been working for a humanitarian organisation to combat the outbreak in DRC had tested positive for the disease.

On 15 July, MSF described the epidemic: "In two months, this outbreak has become the third largest, and fastest growing, Ebola disease outbreak on record", adding that rural communities still lacked adequate support.

On 15 July, staff in Bunia General Hospital and Rwampara General Hospital were on strike due to unpaid wages and difficult working conditions.

=== August ===
On 2 August, the WHO noted that this is the second largest outbreak of Ebola disease in history, exceeded only by the Western Africa epidemic of 2013–2016.

As of 9 August, 45 health workers had died, with 155 having been infected.

A fatality occurred in Buta, Bas-Uélé on 13 August.

On 17 August, it was reported that a mob set fire to an ambulance in the Aru Territory near Bunia in a non-isolated incident. This came a day after a second ambulance was attacked in the area.

On 23 August, the outbreak had reached 5,000 confirmed cases in the first 100 days; by contrast the Western Africa Ebola epidemic (2013-2016) reached 1,000 cases in the same time.

=== September ===
On 11 September, a man died in the town of Gwaka, Sud-Ubangi, in northwest DRC, having tested positive for Bundibugyo. This is far from the epidemic's epicentre in eastern DRC. He had travelled from South Kivu, passing through Rwanda and Uganda before reentering and transiting DRC. There are concerns that he may have had contact with and infected many people during this journey.

=== October ===
On 5 October, a case was reported in Kenya, of a person who had travelled from DRC. The patient, who was a Kenyan national but was residing in the Democratic Republic of Congo, was hospitalized in Kenya, and died on the same day. Further cases were announced in family and health workers who had been in contact with this person.

On 20 October, Nigeria confirmed its first case, the wife of a Swiss diplomat who had flown to Abuja, Nigeria from Entebbe, Uganda.

On 27 October the confirmed Ebola cases in the Democratic Republic of the Congo (DRC) surpassed 10,000.

== Social and political ramifications ==
=== M23 capitalises on Ebola outbreak to exercise its governance capabilities ===
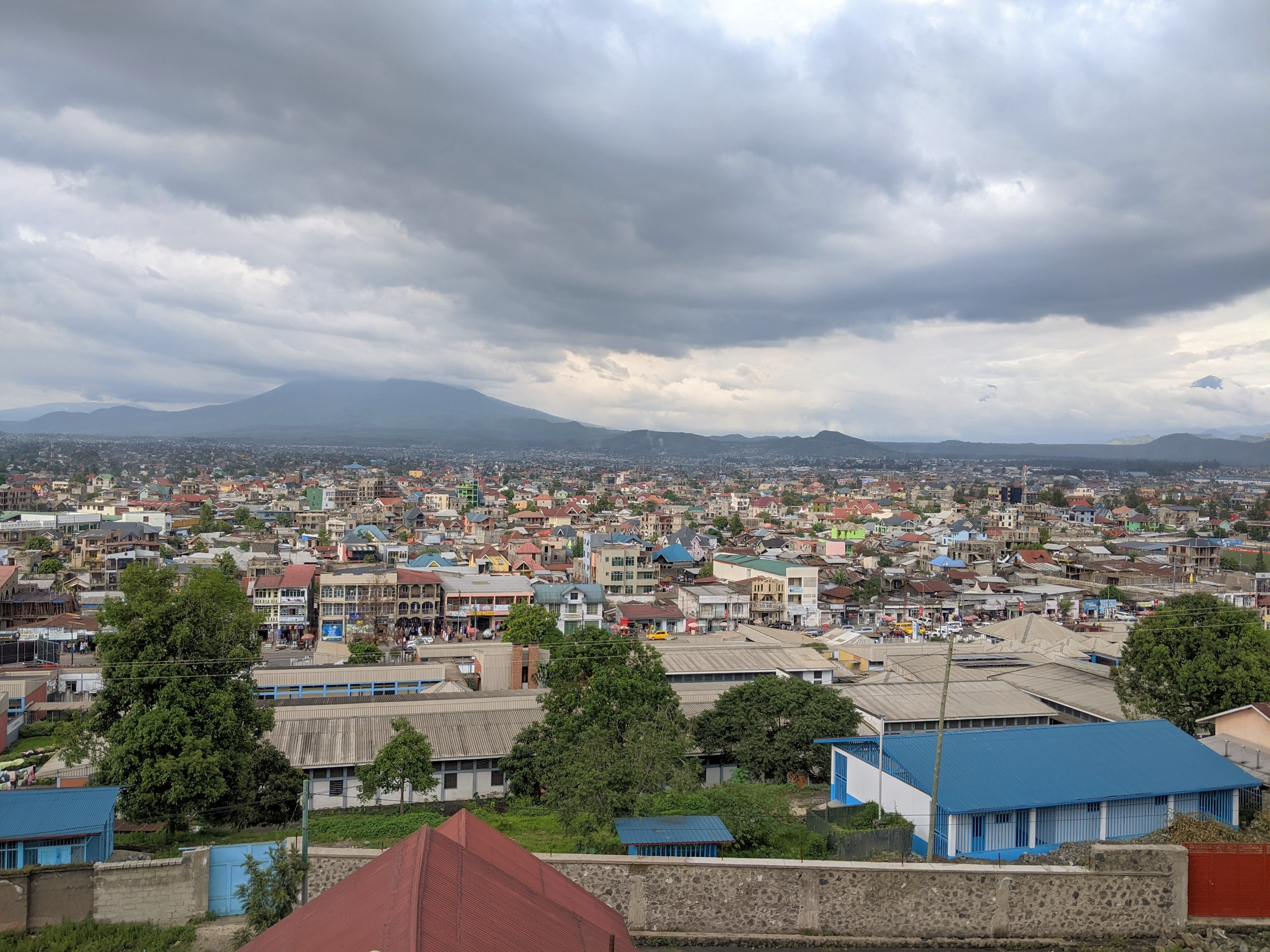
A view of Goma, North Kivu—which M23 captured on 30 January 2025, two weeks before it took over Bukavu on 16 February; it has controlled both major cities during the epidemic

The outbreak of the Ebola epidemic presented an opportunity for the Rwandan proxy group, M23—the Kivu conflict's largest belligerent aside from the Congolese armed forces—to test its governing capabilities in territories it has captured. Controlling a majority of the North and South Kivu provinces, including their respective capitals of Goma and Bukavu, M23 had already been imposing taxes and fulfilling other administrative roles before the outbreak. (Note: According to a 21 July 2026 interview with Kaniki, the AFC was in control of 24,000 km^{2} worth of territory, being home to approximately 14 million people.) Analysts warned that the presence of the conflict would further complicate containment of the epidemic, including difficulties in reaching patients in remote locations fearing their safety, thus deterring them from seeking medical care. Indeed, mobilisation by "trusted community leaders, long-standing humanitarian actors, and UN partners supported by skilled, largely African experts with deep experience in past Ebola outbreaks" were the most significant tool which helped contain the 2018–2020 outbreak. Despite this, M23 was believed to see the DRC's governance void as a chance to bolster public favour in their administrative capabilities.

AFC/M23 is keen to demonstrate its capacity to function as a state and manage a public health crisis better than the Congolese government, but with only four cases recorded, it has been a limited test so far.

— Reagan Miviri, Kinshasa-based Ebuteli research institute, 13 July 2026

To respond to the epidemic, AFC/M23 established an Ebola response team and administration. These teams recorded cases, monitored them, and completed daily follow-ups with patients; (Note: According to a 21 July 2026 interview with Kaniki, the "key to [AFC/M23's] success" for minimizing cases was their 98% follow-up rate with patients. No other sources discussed nor corroborated this claim.) quarantined confirmed cases; restricted movement for the local population, including barring, limiting, and running health and safety checks for bus, minibus, taxi, and passenger boat services; and released cartoons about hand washing. These operations were supported by the Rwandan government through thousands of US dollars worth of equipment and medicine from Rwandan medical facilities. To support their popular support, the AFC/M23 produced promotional videos visiting laboratories and research centres, some of which they helped run. Raimo Mukiza, a taxi-bus driver in Goma, said, however, that "some people follow the measures and others don’t." Nobel Peace Prize-laureate Denis Mukwege corroborated that for those trapped in AFC/M23 territory, the risk is "to be contaminated by Ebola, or to die by hunger or by violence." Having appealed to support from the US, Mukwege said "the world closes its eyes on this situation." M23 also appealed to an international audience, claiming in mid-March 2026 that it would work with international partners to contain the outbreak.

==== M23 claims epidemic eradication, Rwandan support, and political tensions ====
Following the outbreak on 14 May, AFC/M23 said it had recorded four cases within its territories. In late June, following a 21-day monitoring period where it recorded no new cases, and in stark contrast to the rest of the country—AFC/M23 claimed to have stopped the outbreak—hastily attempting to prove their administrative dominance over the Congolese government. To bolster public sentiment of their capabilities, AFC/M23 deputy coordinator for the response to the outbreak, Freddy Kaniki—an MRDP-Twirwaneho-aligned doctor who trained in the US and helped respond to the COVID-19 pandemic—said the group had recorded a total of 400 contacts and led 207 test which Reuters had independently verified by 18 June. Until that point, he said AFC/M23's efforts had been bolstered by aid sent into the DRC from the WHO and the UN Children's Fund (UNICEF), despite not yet having cooperated with the Congolese government. Having spoken of the same concerns on 21 March, Kaniki said on 22 May this aid "should not be political" and should "save lives first." AFC/M23's claim to have eradicated the virus did not hold up, however, following reports on two new cases being imported from Lubero on shared transport services in mid-August. This prompted AFC/M23 to impose travel restrictions. Another new case was recorded in the Kayna health zone, located near Lubero, in early September. The 21-year-old male patient, who had arrived from Butembo, was said to have been transferred to a quarantine facility. AFC/M23 said it had begun tracing contacts connected with the patient and stepped up surveillance to prevent further spreading.

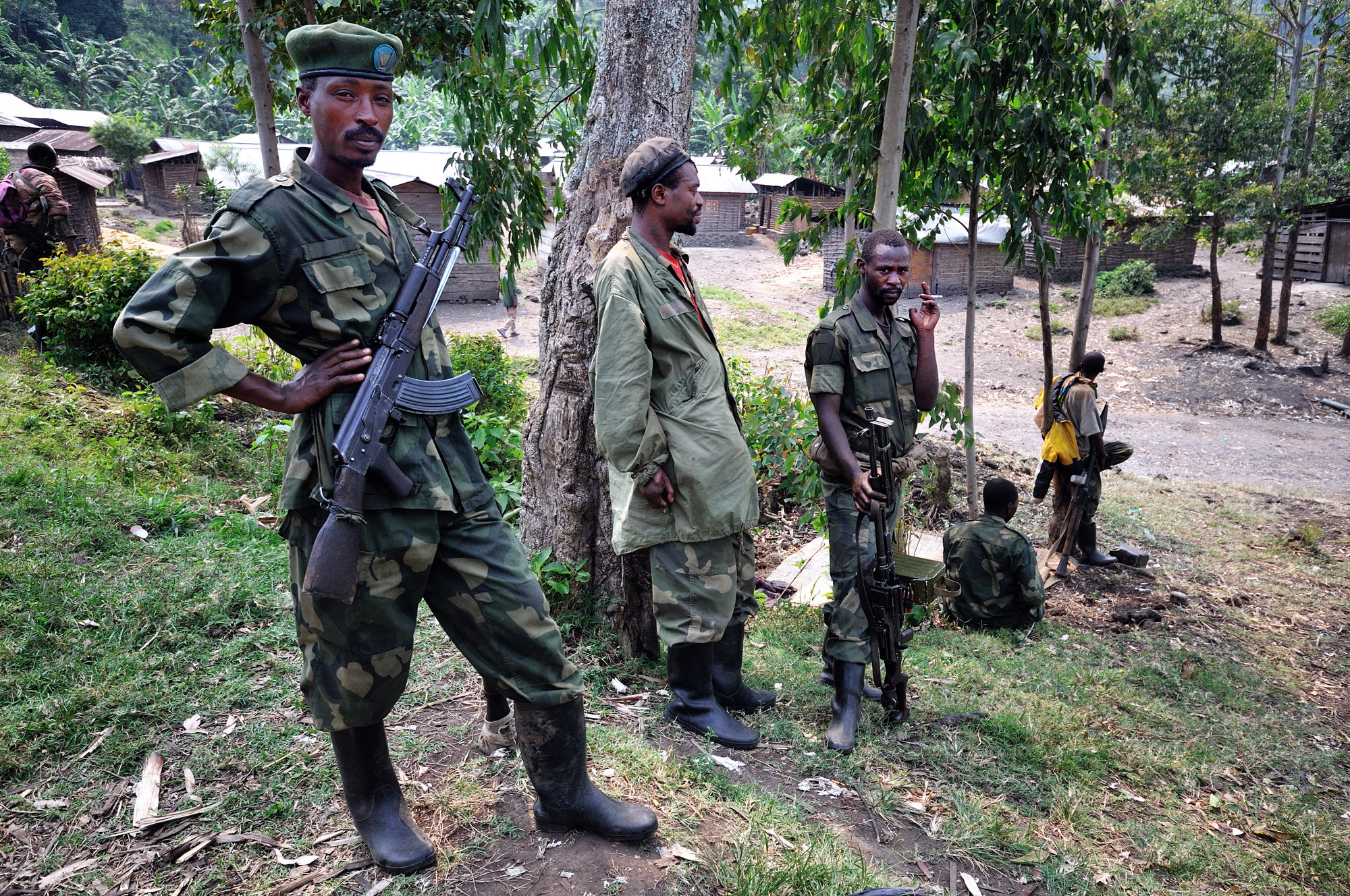
M23 rebels in Bunagana, North Kivu in 2012, where the group's insurgency, aided by Rwanda, resurged in 2022

Kaniki argued that AFC/M23's isolation and monitoring of cases and contacts displayed a greater "discipline" and "anticipation" than that of the central government, despite relying heavily on the aid of Rwanda. By that time, AFC/M23 had received thousands of dollars in materials, including US$6,891 from the Rwanda Biomedical Center and US$85,467 from the Gisenyi Hospital—which documents reveal left response teams still desperately underresourced. Rwanda continued to deny backing the rebels, with Rwandan government spokesperson Yolande Makolo saying Kigali's support was because infections diseases "do not respect borders." AFC/M23 went so far as to accuse the Congolese government of showing "indifference" towards those in Ituri, prompting Congolese foreign minister, Thérèse Kayikwamba Wagner, to responded with the belief that "both the M23 and Rwanda are ill-equipped to run an emergency response for a threat of this magnitude" and that they "must leave the DRC." Despite political tension, some cooperation to halt the outbreak occurred. The AFC/M23 shared with the DRC limited information about data and laboratory testing, which could not be independently verified despite the DRC continuing to pay health workers in rebel-controlled territories.

=== Armed conflict stresses gendered humanitarian crisis and epidemic response efforts ===
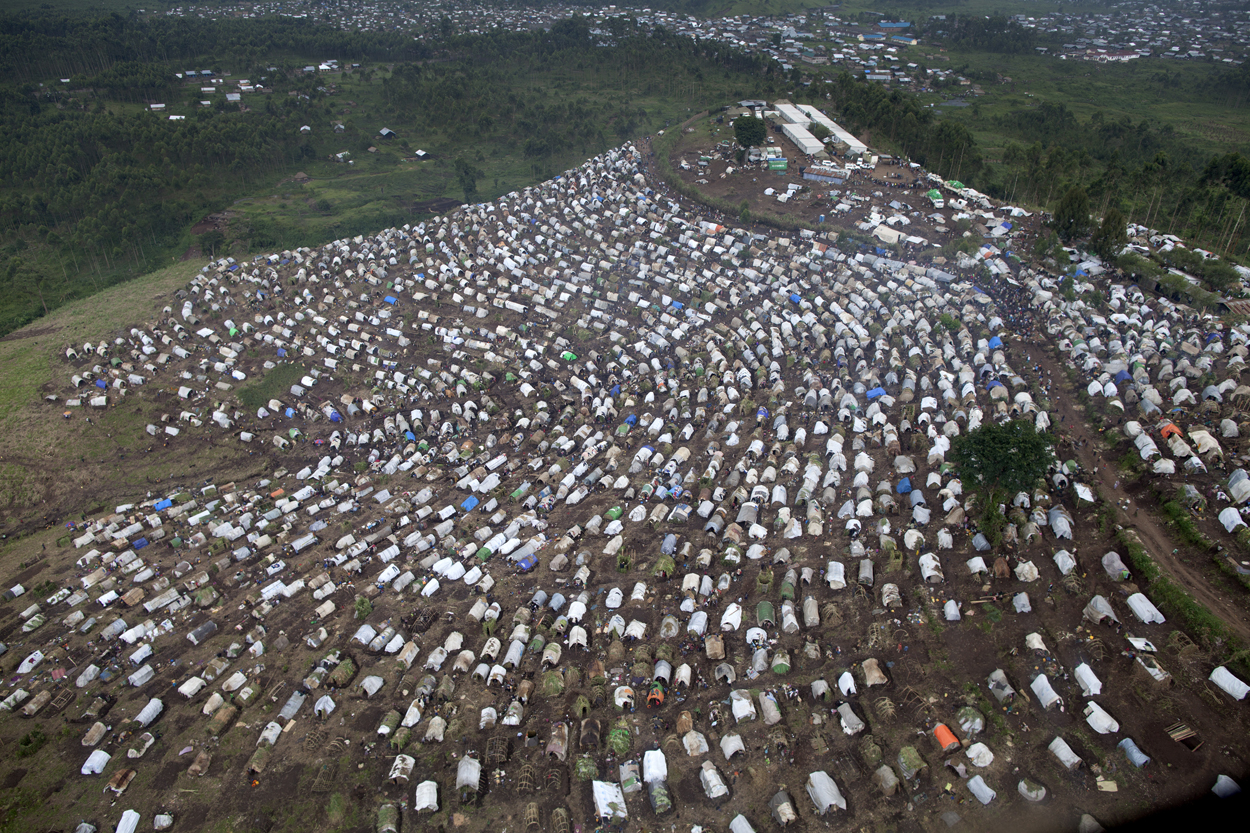
A camp of internally displaced persons (IDPs) around a MONUSCO instillation in Kitchanga, North Kivu—a historic camp for IDPs—in 2013; M23 captured the town in 2023

In spite of the epidemic's outbreak, armed fighting continued between M23 and the Congolese armed forces in the eastern regions of the DRC. Deepening the severe humanitarian crisis, determined to be underway long before the epidemic's outbreak—including consistent attacks and massacres, prevalent food insecurity, one of the largest internally displaced populations, rampant reports of sexual violence, and numerous other insecurities—analysts, non-government organisations (NGOs), international organisations (IOs), and civil societies feared the conflict and resulting insecurity would impact the mitigation of the epidemic. International organisations and experts have highlighted the critical funding gap needed to alleviate the suffering of populations in the country's eastern provinces. Furthermore, domestic and international actors alike have called on further cooperation to deliver, funding for, and supplying of medical equipment to avoid further loss of life.

The outbreak has also had psychological consequences for both patients and survivors, including anxiety, fear of death, social stigma and isolation. In October 2026, the World Health Organization reported that mental health and psychosocial support had been integrated into the Ebola response in DRC for both patients and survivors.

People are displaced by the conflict. Hundreds of thousands of people were displaced and about 100,000 new displaced people were registered, I think, in the first few months. This makes it very difficult to control the epidemic.

— Tedros Adhanom Ghebreyesus, Director-General of the WHO, 29 May 2026

Echoing Tedros' concerns for coordination, European Commissioner for Preparedness and Crisis Management, Hadja Lahbib, argued that civilians populations displaced by armed conflict should be a top priority for epidemic relief efforts. Reassuring that the EU was in discussion with belligerents, Lahbib called for both to "allow safe, rapid and unhindered humanitarian access." Rodriguez Munguakonkwa, President of the Civil Society of Kabare, South Kivu, said that the response should be a "close and well-structured collaboration" that is "visible." Like other analysts emphasised, Munguakonkwa added that "if, despite the armed conflict, everyone continues to consider themselves enemies even in such health circumstances, it is the population who will suffer." CARE International, the International Rescue Committee (IRC), UN Women, and others have pointed out that gendered dynamics of caregiving, food preparation, and burial participation impact women more, accounting for approximately between 53% to 60% of cases in the outbreak by June 2026 according to studies, as it had in previous epidemics in the DRC.

=== Humanitarian aid crisis, strikes by health workers, and health worker shortages ===
Decline in foreign aid to the DRC—originating from an internationalised humanitarian aid funding crisis spurred on in earnest by foreign aid assistance freezes and the dismantling of USAID throughout 2025 at the behest of the US Donald Trump administration—weakened local health and surveillance systems. In addition, fears of siphoning out health funds were reported, prompting DRC's health ministry to begin verifying names on their payroll. Both having played a large part in causing funding to cease or slow for health workers in eastern regions of the DRC for two or more months, numerous strikes by health workers—including those at treatment centres, epidemiologists, case investigators, drivers, and gravediggers—occurred throughout the epidemic. Many workers continued to work unpaid, despite the risks of working at treatment, infection, and care centres. They report receiving promises from the Congolese government stating that they would receive their outstanding payments. One veteran of the 2018 Ebola epidemic and health worker in this epidemic, Wiza Bondele, said he didn't know "whether it is injustice or whether there simply isn’t enough money."

By mid-November 2026, approximately US$2.9 billion had been pledged for the Ebola response, but less than half had been disbursed, according to the Africa Centres for Disease Control and Prevention. Médecins Sans Frontières reported that essential medical supplies were still not reaching affected areas beyond the initial epicentre in Ituri province. Strikes were reported at Rwampara General Hospital in Ituri on 13 July; at Bunia General Hospital in Ituri on 15 July; at the Elikya Ebola Treatment Center in Bunia, Ituri on 25 July—despite the Operations Manager Dr. Adelard Lufungula saying the issue was "being resolved" as the workers were being paid via mobile money; and before the governor's office in Bunia, Ituri on 6 August. More retaliation was reported in September, when some health workers violated Ebola control protocols by allowing grieving families to touch bodies of relatives killed by the virus.

Soon after the beginning of the epidemic, regions facing Ebola began running short on health workers.

=== Other armed insurgencies threaten epidemic containment ===
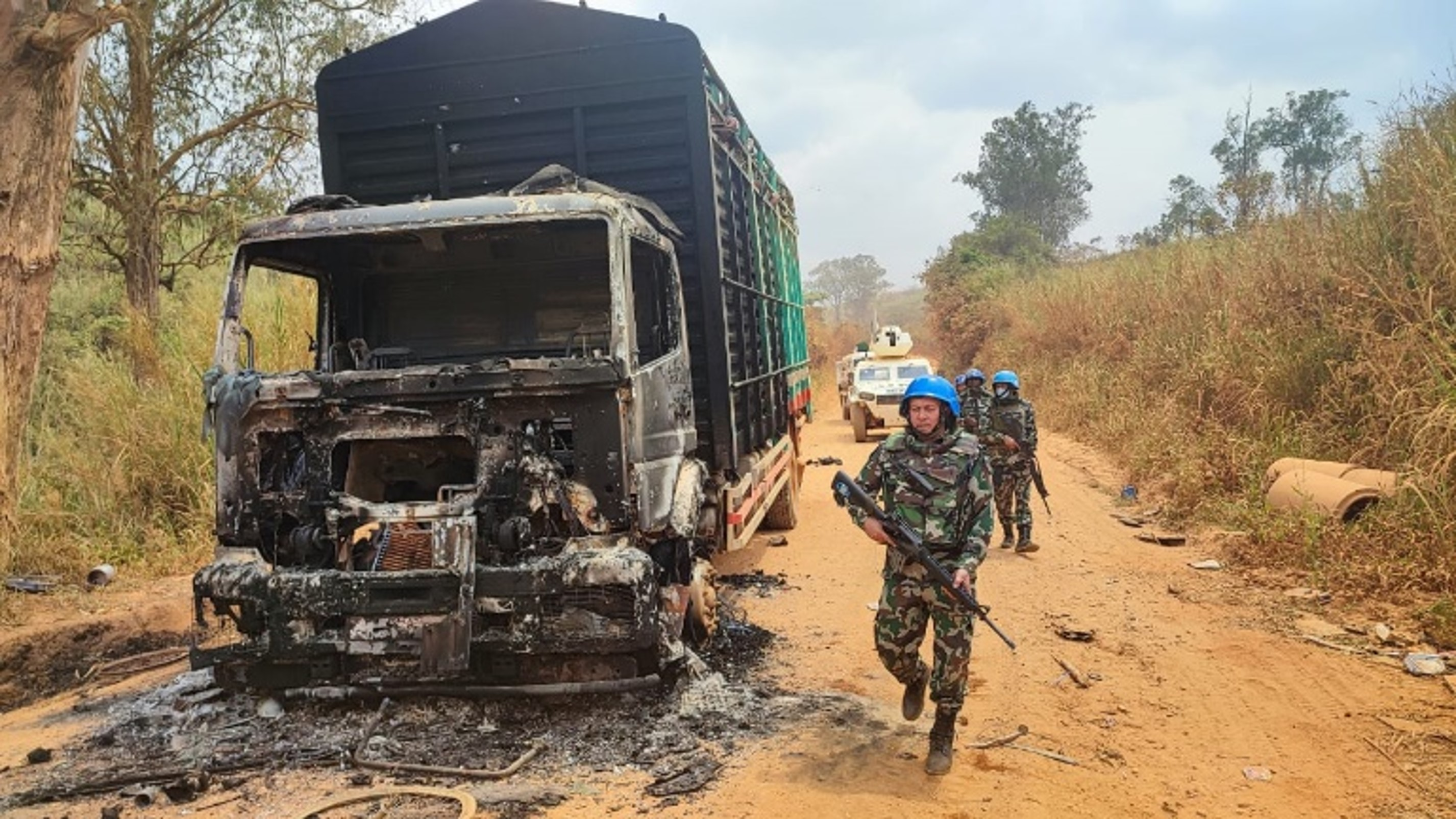
MONUSCO forces responding to an attack on and burning of a civilian vehicle by CODECO forces in Djugu territory, Ituri in 2022

A number of other armed rebels' insurgencies belonging to the broader Kivu conflict further hindered containment of the epidemic, including CODECO and the ADF, the latter of infamously carry out massacres of entire villages. CODECO violence had estimated to have displaced 1 million people since their resurgence in 2017, which have culminated in many victims of violence fleeing to IDP camps with poor conditions—fostering poor sanitation conditions ripe for the spread of Ebola. Alarmingly, between April and June, ADF rebels escalated their campaign on civilians, moving north into the Haut-Uélé, where they did not typically lead operations—having remained for many years resigned to killings in Ituri and North Kivu. The ADF had carried out attacks against health workers before the outbreak of the Ebola epidemic, including the killing of 17 patients at a health centre in November 2025, raising security measures around operations of health workers during the epidemic. Analysts increasingly argued Operation Shujaa—the joint programme between the DRC and Uganda's armed forces fighting the group—could not adequately respond to the violence despite making marginal progress.

== International response ==
=== Africa ===
- Egypt: The country increased surveillance.
- Gabon: The country stepped up its health surveillance.
- Ghana: On 19 May, an Ebola Alert was issued by Ghana Health Service and Health Ministry.
- Kenya: In May, the country had three suspected cases that later tested negative.
- Nigeria: On 24 May, the Lagos State government intensified surveillance of Ebola.
- Mauritania: On 26 May, the government activated emergency surveillance.
- Rwanda: On 22 May, Rwanda introduced a mandatory quarantine for returning travellers from the DRC.
- Somalia: The country issued a nationwide public health warning and strengthened its emergency preparedness measures.
- Tanzania: The country tightened border checks and increased monitoring at airports and seaports.

=== Asia ===
- China: On 1 June, the Ministry of Foreign Affairs announced that it had sent a team of specialists to the DRC to assist in the fight against the Ebola outbreak.
- Hong Kong: On 17 May, authorities activated its Ebola preparedness and response plan, increased health screening for travellers arriving from Africa, advised against non-essential travel to those affected areas, and prepared the Penny's Bay Community Isolation Facility on Lantau Island for possible isolation of suspected imported cases. On 21 May, the Hong Kong Special Administrative Region government announced to issue Red Outbound Travel Alert (OTA) for the DRC.
- Macau: On 26 May, authorities introduced a mandatory 21-day health monitoring period for arrivals from 12 African nations identified as potential risk areas for the Ebola virus outbreak.
- India: On 21 May, the Ministry of Health released an emergency response plan, and on 24 May, issued a public advisory against non-essential travel to affected countries. From 22 May, in the state of Kerala, passengers from the affected countries require a mandatory health surveillance up to 21 days. Kerala strengthened passenger screening for all international travellers and arranged isolation environments.
- Israel: On 28 May, the government urged the public to avoid non-essential travel to areas where there is an outbreak.
- Indonesia: The country enhanced health monitoring at all entry points.
- Japan: On 18 May, The Japan Institute for Health Security (JIHS) said that Japan is at low risk of an Ebola outbreak.
- Jordan: the country imposed 30 days ban for all travellers arriving from the Democratic Republic of the Congo (DRC) and the Republic of Uganda except for Jordanians. The ban was effective from 20 May 2026 and reviewed on monthly basis to remain in effect until further notice according to epidemiological situational assessment.
- Kuwait: The Ministry of Health advised against travel to the DRC, Uganda and South Sudan.
- Malaysia: The Ministry of Health said it was monitoring travellers entering the country especially from Uganda and the DRC, including those transiting through international hubs such as Dubai, Doha and Singapore on 20 May.
- Nepal: The country quarantined some peacekeepers in the DRC, and has almost 1,000 currently in the DRC. It has no plans to rotate these troops and has a mandatory 21-day isolation for them.
- Philippines: The Department of Health (DOH) said travellers returning from those regions will receive enhanced screening. The Bureau of Quarantine is also on alert at airports and seaports for border control.
- Singapore: On 19 May, Singapore issued health advisories and encouraged travellers from the affected region to monitor for symptoms for 21 days upon arrival.
- South Korea: The country expanded its health alert on 26 May to include Ethiopia and Rwanda, on top of the DRC, Uganda, and South Sudan. South Korea will also start checking returning travellers' mobile roaming history and data.
- Taiwan: The DRC and Uganda were placed on a level 2 health alert by the Taiwan CDC.
- Thailand: The country imposed a 21-day quarantine order for travellers arriving from DRC and Uganda on 26 May.
- United Arab Emirates: The Emirati airline Emirates issued a travel advisory.
- Uzbekistan: Health authorities conducted health screenings at border checkpoints and issued an advisory against non-essential travel to affected countries.
- Vietnam: The country imposed a 21-day isolation for travellers from the DRC and Uganda on 26 May.

=== Europe ===
- Austria: There is an active travel advisory to the DRC and Uganda.
- Belgium: On 23 May, the US government told the DR Congo national football team to self-isolate. They are reported to be in isolation in Belgium.
- Italy: On 19 May, officials activated an emergency response plan in response to Ebola.
- Netherlands: On 22 May, a patient who visited the affected areas was hospitalised in the country.
- Poland: There is an active travel advisory issued by the Ministry of Foreign Affairs, against all travels to the DRC and against any non-essential travel to Uganda (except the regions bordering with DRC and South Sudan – against all travels)
- Portugal: New screening rules were put in place on 19 May.
- Russia: Health minister Mikhail Murashko said that Russia has developed an Ebola vaccine which may be effective for the Bundibugyo ebolavirus strain; however, they have not yet been able to test it against a sample of the virus.
- Spain: Health authorities reviewed safety measures for a football match between Chile and the DRC scheduled for 9 June in La Línea de la Concepción, which was then cancelled by the municipal government on 2 June, citing possible health risks.
- Sweden: On 17 May, the Ministry for Public Health issued updated travel advisories for travellers to and from the DRC. The Ministry for Foreign Affairs has had an active travel advisory against non-essential travel to the DRC since 3 June 2025.

=== North America ===
- Bahamas: On 21 May, a British Airways flight to the Cayman Islands was diverted to the nation over Ebola concerns.
- Canada: On 20 May, the Canadian government stated that a person in Ontario was being tested after travelling to Ethiopia and showing symptoms. They tested negative on 22 May. On 21 May, a flight to Detroit had to land in Canada over a possible case of Ebola after an error in boarding. On 26 May, the Public Health Agency of Canada announced the suspension of visas for residents of the DRC, Uganda, and South Sudan, and issued a quarantine requirement for individuals (including Canadian citizens and permanent residents) who had been in the same three countries in the previous 21 days.
- Cayman Islands: On 20 May, the islands put in enhanced screening following an Ebola scare on a flight that diverted to the Bahamas.
- Jamaica: The Planning Institute of Jamaica (PIOJ) warned that the tourism industry would be impacted if Ebola was not under control.
- Mexico: On 21 May, the government issued a travel advisory for Ebola.
- Panama: The country issued an active alert for Ebola.
- St. Kitts and Nevis: On 29 May, the country denied 17 Nigerians over an Ebola scare.
- United States: On 15 May, the US Centers for Disease Control and Prevention (CDC) issued health notices for people travelling to Uganda and to the DRC. On 18 May, the CDC issued a 30-day prohibition on non-Americans entering the United States who had been in the DRC, Uganda, or South Sudan in the preceding 21 days, with limited exceptions. On 21 May, all returning US citizens and residents from those countries were required to enter the United States via Washington Dulles International Airport (IAD). On 22 May, the travel ban was extended to all green card holders.

=== Oceania ===
- Australia: The Department of Health, Disability and Ageing issued a health alert for Ebola, and considered it to be low risk to Australia.
- Fiji: The Ministry of Health and Medical Services issued a advisory for the affected areas and all countries that shared a land border which included South Sudan, Kenya, Tanzania, Rwanda, Burundi, Zambia, Angola, the Republic of the Congo and the Central African Republic.

=== South America ===
- Brazil: There is an active alert for Ebola.
- Chile: Concerns were raised in relation to the upcoming 2026 FIFA World Cup match between it and the DRC in Spain. Experts have warned the country to be on alert.
- Colombia: On 20 May, Colombia issued an alert in relation to an upcoming 2026 FIFA World Cup match between it and the DRC.
- Peru: Since 2019, there has been an active alert for Ebola.

== See also ==
- Viral replication
- List of Ebola outbreaks
