= Internally displaced persons in the Democratic Republic of the Congo =

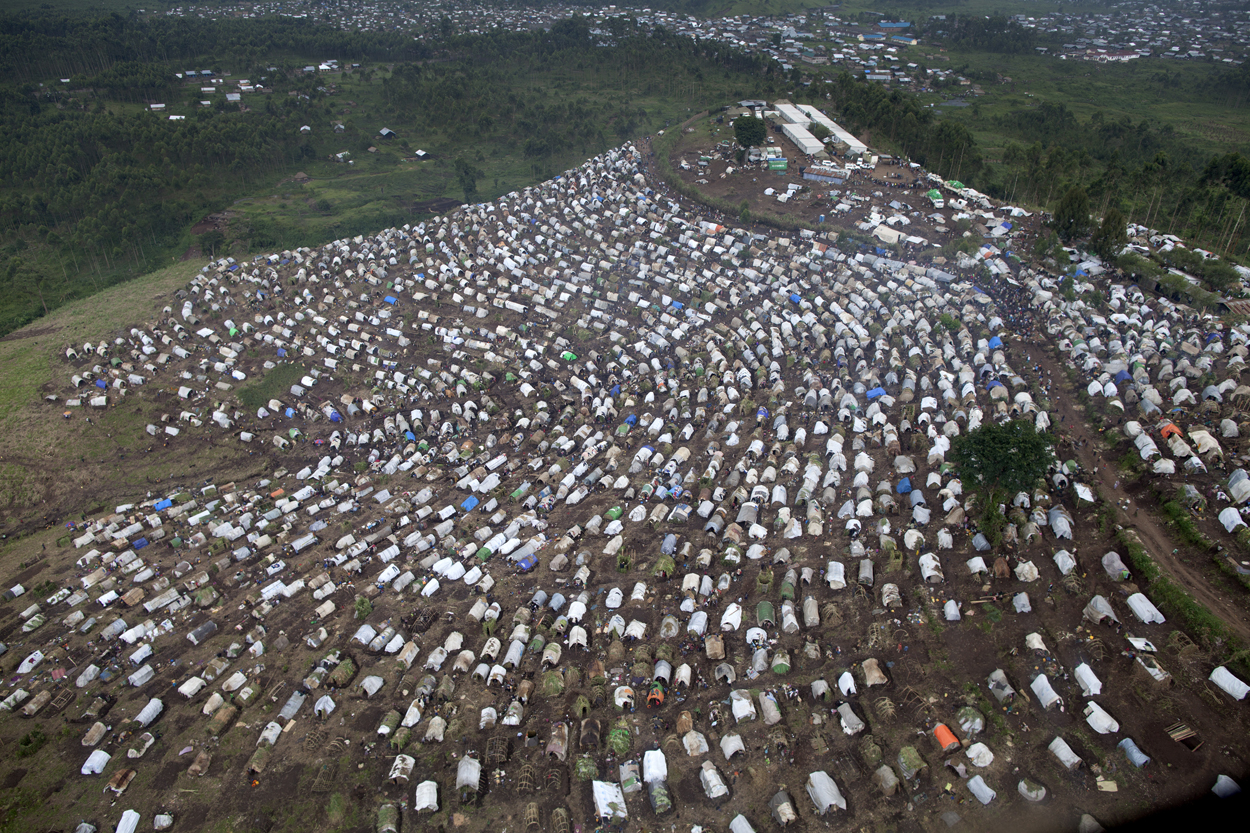
A camp for internally displaced people at Kitchanga in 2013.

The Democratic Republic of the Congo (DRC) has one of the largest populations of internally displaced persons in the world. As of February 2025, over 6.9 million people have been forced to leave their homes but remain displaced inside the country. More than a million Congolese have sought refuge abroad.

The term internally displaced persons (IDPs) refers to movements of people within the DRC, which are a distinct population from refugees who fled to the DRC from other countries, such as the 1.2 million Rwandan refugees who arrived during the Great Lakes refugee crisis in 1994.

== Reasons for displacement ==
=== Armed conflict ===
Large-scale displacement in the DR Congo has its roots in the First (1996–1997) and Second Congo Wars (1998–2003), but contemporary refugee flows are primarily driven by ongoing violence in the Kivu and Ituri regions. Armed conflict is the main driver of internal displacement, accounting for an estimated 85 percent of all movements.

Within this broad category, factors such as land disputes also play an important role in prompting people to flee. Strong population growth has increased pressure on land, particularly in conflict affected areas where insecurity has caused large scale displacement. Competition over land has led to disputes between displaced people and host communities, which in turn heighten existing protection risks, including limited access to services and education, exposure to exploitation and widespread gender based violence.

==== Kivu conflict ====
The Kivu conflict is an umbrella term for a series of protracted armed confrontations in North Kivu and South Kivu in eastern DR Congo that have taken place since the end of the Second Congo War. It has broadly consisted of three phases: June 2004 – February 2009; April 2012 – November 2013; and January 2015 to the present. Each phase of the conflict included serious abuses and violence against civilians, but violence did not cease between these phases. The conflict also led to the destruction of many communities and caused severe damage to essential facilities such as schools, hospitals and clinics.

==== Ituri conflict ====
The Ituri conflict is an ongoing low intensity asymmetrical conflict between the agriculturalist Lendu and pastoralist Hema ethnic groups in the Ituri region of the north-eastern Democratic Republic of the Congo. While the two groups had fought since as early as 1972, there was a period of intense violence between 1999 and 2003. Armed conflict continues to the present day.

Since 2018, violence in Ituri has surged, with Lendu militias carrying out widespread attacks on Hema communities, involving killings, sexual violence and the destruction of villages. President Félix Tshisekedi condemned the renewed violence in 2019 as an attempted genocide, and in early 2020, the United Nations described the abuses as crimes against humanity.

=== Natural disasters ===
By October 2025, at the national level, around 15% of internally displaced people were uprooted by natural disasters such as floods and landslides. Examples of these were the 2019-2020 flooding of the Congo river and the 2023 African Great Lakes floods.

== History ==
The issue has been ongoing for many years, with millions of displaced persons forced from their homes, often repeatedly.

Despite a large population of IDPs, humanitarian aid has been very limited, with outbreaks of cholera and measles on top of the issues with violence. The Norwegian Refugee Council has characterized the situation in the DRC as the world's most neglected displacement crisis. The regional coordinator of Médecins Sans Frontières has said the humanitarian response to the conflict is far short of the scale of the problem.

Displaced persons often flee to temporary camps. Residents of such camps can be subject to physical violence, such as repeated deadly attacks against internally displaced people in Ituri Province by the armed group CODECO, such as the Plaine Savo massacre. Residents of displacement camps are subject to an elevated risk of sexual violence, as noted by Congolese gynecologist Denis Mukwege.

From July 2016 to March 2017, nearly half a million were displaced by the Batwa–Luba clashes in Tanganyika Province.

In 2017, violence related to the Kamwina Nsapu rebellion displaced 1.4 million people in the Kasaï region in central DRC.

In North Kivu province, from 2014 to 2016, the governor of the province made efforts to close the IDP camps, surmising that the camps were hotbeds for rebel activity and were connected to a lack of local oversight of the NGOs. This brought the number of IDP camps in the province to 47, down from 60.

At the end of 2020, the security situation remained unstable, marked by ongoing inter-ethnic violence and armed attacks, especially in the east. As a result, more than 5.2 million people were internally displaced, making it the largest IDP crisis in Africa and one of the world’s most severe and protracted humanitarian emergencies.

In 2022, rising violence in the eastern provinces of Ituri, North Kivu and South Kivu worsened the already fragile security situation in the DRC, forcing hundreds of thousands of people from their homes and causing many deaths.

As of 2023, the population of the North Kivu camps had increased again, with some 600,000 people fleeing violence from the M23 offensive and several camps around the city of Goma. The Bulengo camp near Goma alone held over 120,000 people in 2023. As of December 2023, the country also hosts more than 500,000 refugees from neighbouring states, mainly from Rwanda, the Central African Republic, South Sudan and Burundi.

In May 2026, an Ebola outbreak began in DR Congo. Among the IDP's at risk of Ebola were nearly 1 million in Ituri Province, where the three towns most affected by the latest outbreak were located.

== Demographics ==
Roughly half of the displaced population is female, half is male. Children make up the largest share at nearly 59%, followed by adults (18-59 y o) at 37% and a small elderly population of just over 4%. More than half of the displaced persons came from North Kivu, almost 40 percent from South Kivu, and a much smaller proportion from Ituri, Tanganyika, and Maniema.

== Humanitarian conditions ==
=== Food insecurity ===
An assessment covering July to December 2023 estimated that 25.4 million people, about 23 percent of the population, were experiencing severe food insecurity at IPC Phase 3 or above. Many households could barely meet their basic food needs after losing essential sources of livelihood. Limited transport infrastructure, isolated locations, climatic shocks, and shortages of tools and agricultural inputs were identified as major drivers of the crisis.

Conditions were even more severe in provinces affected by active conflict. In North Kivu and Ituri, around one third of the population faced severe food insecurity. Armed groups have targeted food production, and the systems for producing, processing and accessing food have been profoundly disrupted.

=== Impacts of repeated displacement ===
Repeated displacement left affected people increasingly vulnerable, as they lost their homes, livelihoods and land, and their social networks became fragmented. Many were cut off from essential services, including healthcare and safe drinking water. Children who were unable to remain in school faced heightened protection risks, such as recruitment by armed groups and child labour, while gender based violence remained widespread.

=== Return movements ===
Return movements form part of displacement dynamics in DR Congo. People may return after shifts in violence or security conditions, including when displacement sites are attacked or emptied, which can lead to both new displacement and re displacement before conditions allow some to go back to their areas of origin. Such returns often involve significant humanitarian needs and occur in contexts where people remain exposed to protection concerns, including gender based violence, forced recruitment, loss of land, and hazards from improvised explosive devices.

=== Gender-based violence ===
Gender-based violence is widespread, with women and girls facing a heightened risk of sexual assault, exploitation and abuse. For example, displaced women who enter nearby forests to gather firewood to sell and support their families are frequently subjected to sexual assault and rape. The collapse of social systems and the continued activity of armed groups have created conditions in which such violence flourishes. Its impact goes far beyond the immediate injuries, often leading to ongoing trauma and long-term psychological harm.

== See also ==
- Nyanzale
- Dubie
- Human rights in the Democratic Republic of the Congo
- Refugees of the Democratic Republic of the Congo
- Sexual violence in the Democratic Republic of the Congo
