= Refugees of the Democratic Republic of the Congo =

Refugees of the Democratic Republic of the Congo are people originating from the Democratic Republic of the Congo (DR Congo), a country with more than 114 million inhabitants, who seek refuge outside the borders of their native country. For decades, DR Congo has faced recurring conflict, political volatility and deep economic difficulties. Armed violence is widespread, particularly in the east, where more than 120 non-state groups operate and often inflame local tensions. Civilians are frequently trapped in these clashes. These conditions have displaced more than eight million people from their homes. As of September 2025, an estimated 8.2 million people had been internally displaced, but more than 1.2 million Congolese have sought refuge abroad, with almost half living in Uganda.

As of December 2023, the country also hosts more than 500,000 refugees from neighbouring states, mainly from Rwanda, the Central African Republic, South Sudan and Burundi.

== Reasons for displacement ==
Large-scale displacement in the DR Congo has its roots in the First (1996–1997) and Second Congo Wars (1998–2003), but contemporary refugee flows are primarily driven by ongoing violence in the Kivu and Ituri regions.

=== Kivu conflict ===
The Kivu conflict is an umbrella term for a series of protracted armed confrontations in North Kivu and South Kivu in eastern DR Congo that have taken place since the end of the Second Congo War. Its major phases include the CNDP rebellion from June 2004 to February 2009; the M23 rebellion from April 2012 – November 2013; and renewed conflict from January 2015 onward. Each phase of the conflict included serious abuses and violence against civilians, but violence did not cease between these phases. The conflict also led to the destruction of many communities and caused severe damage to essential facilities such as schools, hospitals and clinics.

=== Ituri conflict ===
The Ituri conflict is an ongoing low intensity asymmetrical conflict between the agriculturalist Lendu and pastoralist Hema ethnic groups in the Ituri region of the north-eastern Democratic Republic of the Congo. While the two groups had fought since as early as 1972, there was a period of intense violence between 1999 and 2003. Armed conflict continues to the present day.

Since 2018, violence in Ituri has surged, with Lendu militias carrying out widespread attacks on Hema communities, involving killings, sexual violence and the destruction of villages. President Félix Tshisekedi condemned the renewed violence in 2019 as an attempted genocide, and in early 2020, the United Nations described the abuses as crimes against humanity.

== Internally displaced Congolese ==
As of February 2025, over 6.9 million people have been forced to leave their homes but remain displaced inside the country.

== Host countries ==
=== Uganda ===
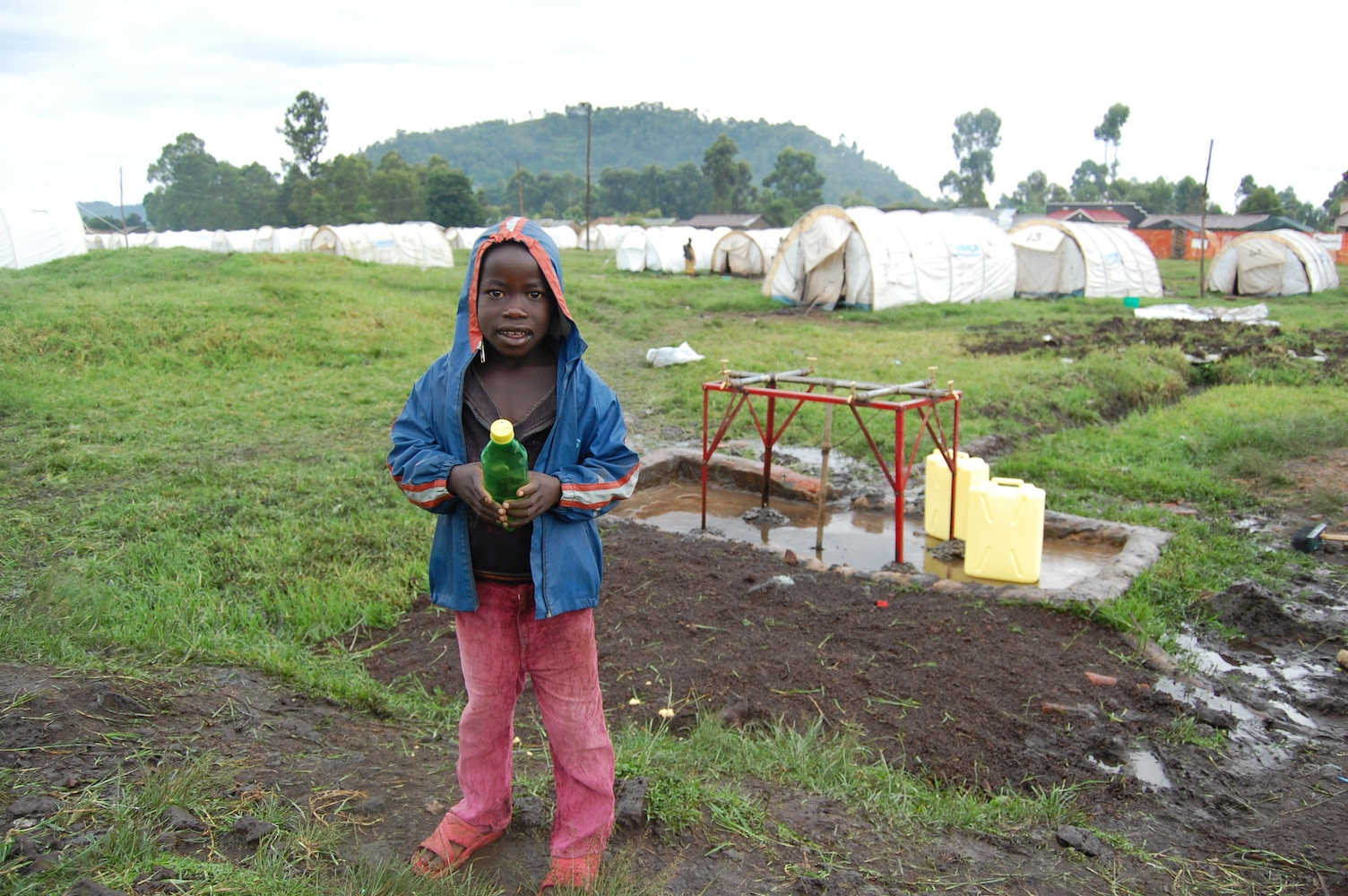
A newly arrived child refugee from DRC collecting clean drinking water in Nyakabande transit camp in Uganda, 2013

Uganda hosts one of the world's largest refugee population and is known for a model based on open borders, land allocation and access to work and public services. By October 2025, the country had taken in roughly 1.95 million refugees. By April 2025, Uganda hosted almost 600,000 refugees from DR Congo, a population that is predominantly rural.

In December 2017, intensified fighting in the northeast of DR Congo prompted thousands of people to flee into Uganda. More than 10,000 individuals crossed the border within a month, most of them women and children, as they escaped widespread violence against civilians, including killings, sexual assault, abductions, looting and forced recruitment by armed groups.

The influx grew rapidly in early 2018. Hundreds of unaccompanied and separated children crossing the border each week through Kisoro. By January 2018, Uganda was hosting more than 250,000 Congolese refugees with children making up the majority of new arrivals. In a single February week, more than 22,000 people crossed Lake Albert into Uganda, and several refugees drowned when an overcrowded canoe capsized. By mid-February 2018, roughly 34,000 people had entered Uganda since the start of the year, many fleeing intensified attacks on civilians and widespread destruction in Ituri. UNHCR warned that the dangerous lake crossings and continuing violence placed refugees at severe risk and called for greater humanitarian access inside DR Congo.

By April 2019, the number of Congolese refugees in Uganda had risen to more than 300,000. Many had moved into Kampala and other urban areas in search of better access to services and economic opportunities. Uganda's integration policy allowed refugees to live alongside local communities, but limited resources in settlements and the Ebola outbreak in eastern DR Congo created serious public-health concerns.

In April 2022, renewed fighting in Rutshuru territory forced thousands of Congolese to flee into Uganda, with around 10,000 people finding refuge in Kisoro district. Many arrived in vulnerable conditions, including unaccompanied children, older people and those with disabilities, and most stayed close to the border to monitor the situation at home. Over the course of the year, an estimated 60,000 people fled to Uganda, largely women and children escaping intensified clashes between government forces and armed groups. In 2023 and 2024, the conflict in eastern DR Congo continued to drive displacement, with an estimated (Note: Source says: 27,357 from January to September 2023.) 35,000 new arrivals in 2023 and more than 30,000 new arrivals in 2024.

Since the beginning of 2025, Uganda experienced a rapid rise in arrivals from the DR Congo as insecurity intensified in the eastern provinces. The influx came at a time when the country already was under strain from reduced humanitarian funding and from responding to tens of thousands of Sudanese who had fled the war in Sudan. By June 2025, 63,000 Congolese had entered Uganda since the start of the year, pushing the total Congolese refugee population in the country to almost 600,000.

Reception centres in Uganda, especially Nyakabande and Matanda, were overwhelmed by this influx of refugees, with overcrowding, with shortages of water, latrines and bathing facilities creating significant health risks. Cuts to humanitarian funding further reduced essential support across the country, including closures of health facilities, loss of early-childhood staff and delays in shelter and transport assistance.

Children made up a large share of the new arrivals and many reached Uganda in poor health, with high levels of malaria and malnutrition. Reports indicated that 17% of newly arrived Congolese refugee children under five suffered from acute malnutrition. Since January 2025, several children under five had died from malnutrition-related anaemia at the Nyakabande and Matanda transit centres in the southwest, where incoming refugees were first received.

From January to April 2026, more than 41,000 Congolese refugees entered Uganda, increasing the Congolese refugee population there to nearly 600,000. The arrivals averaged about 600 people a day, adding pressure to Uganda’s refugee response at a time of funding cuts and new arrivals from Sudan. Children were especially affected, with many arriving in poor health and several under-five deaths from malnutrition-related anaemia reported at transit centres in southwestern Uganda.

In May 2026, an Ebola outbreak began in DR Congo. On 28 May, Uganda shut its border with DR Congo for four weeks in an attempt to prevent the spread of Ebola.

=== Burundi ===
During the 2020s, Burundi faced one of its worst domestic crises in decades, with prolonged fuel shortages, power cuts and water scarcity severely disrupting essential services and daily life. At the same time, the country was contending with outbreaks of cholera, measles and especially malaria.

Burundi had hosted about 50,000 long-time refugees from the DRC, and by March 2025 an additional 66,000 people had arrived, increasing the total population to approximately 120,000. This was the largest influx the country had seen in many years. More than half of the new arrivals were children; there were also many women and older people. The rapid increase in arrivals strained available resources, and severe funding shortages in the humanitarian sector further reduced the staff and resources available for assistance. As a result, significant cuts to food assistance were made, reducing daily caloric intake for newly arrived Congolese refugees from 75 percent to 50 percent of recommended levels by June 2025.

The arrival of large numbers of people also placed heavy pressure on shelters and local health facilities. Schools, clinics and basic sanitation services were either unavailable or operating beyond their capacity. Severe living conditions in Burundi and renewed fighting in eastern DR Congo, including clashes between M23 rebels and government forces, have led some refugees to move repeatedly between the two countries. Nearly half of the 700 people registered by the UN during a week in April 2025 had already been registered in Burundi, underscoring the extreme vulnerability of Congolese refugees.

=== Tanzania ===
As of mid-2025, Tanzania hosted about 231,000 refugees, 35 percent of whom were from DR Congo, amounting to 86,478 people, while 65 percent were from Burundi. Most refugees in the country lived in the Nyarugusu and Nduta camps, which together sheltered over 190,000 people, while only a small number resided in urban areas such as Dar es Salaam. Humanitarian organisations have struggled to provide essential services such as drinking water, education, shelter and social support because of limited funding. At the same time, stricter administrative rules in the camps have reduced opportunities for protection, livelihoods and self-reliance, leaving refugees almost entirely dependent on humanitarian aid.

=== South Africa ===
As of February 2025, South Africa hosted about 46,000 refugees from DR Congo.

== Humanitarian impact ==
Women and girls face heightened risks in this crisis, including sexual and other forms of gender-based violence, and some have turned to transactional sex as a way to cope with severe food shortages. Displaced children across the DRC have missed at least a full year of schooling. Food insecurity has worsened as conflict limits access to farmland, and many displaced families are sheltering in improvised structures that offer little protection from harsh weather.

== See also ==
- Human rights in the Democratic Republic of the Congo
- Sexual violence in the Democratic Republic of the Congo
