= Mongbwalu =

Town in Ituri Province, DR Congo

- Location within Democratic Republic of the Congo
- Coordinates: 1.935157°N 30.046234°E
- Country: Democratic Republic of the Congo
- Province: Ituri Province
- Territory: Djugu Territory

Mongbwalu is a small town in the Djugu Territory of the Ituri Province in the Democratic Republic of the Congo.

== History ==
Before the Belgians arrived in the region the local Banyali people used gold to make jewellery, but otherwise did not see the metal as commercially valuable. The Belgians found gold about 30 kilometres (19 mi) from Mongbwalu in 1903 and began commercial exploitation of Kilo-Moto gold resources in 1905. From 1926 to 1966, mining operations were controlled by the Societe des Mines d'Or de Kilo-Moto (SOKIMO). During the colonial era about 1.3 million ounces of gold were extracted from the Mongbwalu area. Soon after independence, in 1967 the government nationalized SOKIMO. Production quickly declined due to lack of investment and exploration, dropping to under 15,000 ounces per year.

In 1981, mining in the region was opened to private enterprise, causing rapid growth in artisanal mining as well as formal commercial mining by foreign companies. Gold mining resumed its decline in the 1980s and 1990s. Industrial gold production was affected by the First Congo War from October 1996 to May 1997 and halted by the Second Congo War from August 1998 to May 2003. In 2002 and 2003 there were a series battles between rival armed groups over Mongbwalu in which 2,000 civilians died. In some cases civilians were killed because they were Hema or Lendu people. The town changed hands five times. The Nationalist and Integrationist Front (FNI) Lendu militia emerged the winner. The FNI controlled Mongbwalu and its gold mines until the middle of 2005, using the gold to pay its troops and to buy supplies and weapons.

Concession 40 covers 8,191 square kilometres (3,163 sq mi) surrounding Mongbwalu, and includes the underground Adidi, Makala and Senzere mines. AngloGold Ashanti Kilo, a joint venture between AngloGold Ashanti and the government-owned OKIMO, gained the rights to concession 40, starting exploration in November 2003 and expanding its activities as the UN and DRC government regained and consolidated control over the region. In a major 2005 report, Human Rights Watch accused AngloGold Ashanti Kilo of providing assistance to the FNI during the 2003-2005 period in exchange for gold concessions. The company denies any wrongdoing. The company has provided assistance to the local hospital and schools, and has helped with road repair and drainage works. After further negotiations with OKIMO, in 2010 AngloGold Ashanti began a feasibility study for a proposed mine near Mongbwalu.

== Demographics ==
Mongbwalu lies within the Kilo-Moto region and has long been a center of gold mining, with three nearby underground industrial mines: Adidi, Senzere and Makala. As of 2008 the town had a population of about 50,000, mostly Banyali and Lendu, but with people from many other ethnic groups who have been attracted by the gold mining opportunities. Nearby villages include Kilo, Kobu, Lipri, Bambu and Mbijo. Around 25,000 to 30,000 men, women and children in the region around Mongbwalu were engaged in gold mining, transport and processing. Much of the gold extracted in Mongbwalu is traded across the border to Uganda.

== Economy ==
=== Mining operations ===
Gold is found in river beds and topsoils as flecks or small nuggets of 90-95% pure gold, and is also extracted from crushed rocks obtained from underground and open-pit mines. The Adidi underground mine directly or indirectly employed about 5,000 people in various jobs. In December 2007 these people were thrown out of work when the Orientale Province governor Medard Autsai Asenga ordered the mine to close. The abandoned Senzere and Makala underground mines are still being worked informally in extremely difficult and dangerous conditions.

In 2007 there were about 33 pit mining sites near Mongbwalu, each with several pits, some with several thousand miners. The pits may be up to 30 metres (98 ft) deep. Mud slides and flooding are commonplace. Alluvial mining is also practiced in rivers and riparian areas, although productivity is declining. Many of the rivers have been diverted to form mudflats where men, women and children can sift the mud to look for flecks of gold. Primitive dredging machines are also used to suck up mud from the river bottoms to be sifted for gold. Most miners earn a precarious living working long hours in dangerous and unhealthy conditions.

== Sources ==
- AngloGold Ashanti (2006). "Anglogold Ashanti's Activities in the Democratic Republic of the Congo" (PDF).
- Creamer, Martin (7 May 2010). "Tanzania, Brazil buoy AngloGold Ashanti, South Africa lower". Mining Weekly.
- Fahey, Dan (2008). "Le Fleuve D'or: The Production and Trade of Gold From Mongbwalu, DRC" (PDF). L’Afrique des Grands Lacs. Annuaire 2007-2008.
- "Major corporations profit from illicit Congo gold trade". MAC: Mines and Communities. 2005-06-01.
- Ross, Will (3 June 2005). "On the trail of DR Congo's 'cursed' gold". BBC News.
