= Ceasefire Monitoring and Verification Mechanism =

Agreement to stabilize eastern Congo

Doha 6
Ceasefire Monitoring and Verification Mechanism
- Type: Political or peace agreement framework
- Context: To monitor and verify the implementation of the permanent ceasefire and support peace stabilization in eastern Congo.
- Signed: 14 October 2025; 8 months ago
- Location: Doha, Qatar
- Mediators: Qatar (lead mediator); African Union; International Conference on the Great Lakes Region; United States
- Negotiators: DR Congo; Congo River Alliance

The Ceasefire Monitoring and Verification Mechanism (French: Mécanisme de surveillance et de vérification du cessez-le-feu), often referred to as "Doha 6", is a framework established on 14 October 2025 in Doha, Qatar, after the sixth round of negotiations between the Government of the Democratic Republic of the Congo and the Congo River Alliance (Alliance Fleuve Congo; AFC), under the mediation of Qatar. The Mechanism is composed of an equal number of representatives from the Congolese government and the AFC, alongside observers from the African Union, Qatar, and the United States. The International Conference on the Great Lakes Region (ICGLR) oversees its implementation through its Expanded Joint Verification Mechanism Plus (EJVM+; French: Mécanisme conjoint de vérification élargi plus, MCVE+), which coordinates operations and incorporates military experts from ICGLR member countries, party representatives, and MONUSCO, responsible for logistical support.

The Mechanism is tasked with monitoring compliance with the permanent ceasefire, verifying and investigating violations, and maintaining communication between the two sides to prevent renewed hostilities, while ensuring that monitoring teams have secure and unimpeded access to both sides of the conflict line and that incidents are recorded and reported within 72 hours. The MCVE+ produces weekly reports and incident summaries for submission to the Mechanism's leadership. This initiative revives and expands upon the ICGLR's 2012 Goma-based verification structures, which were designed to investigate and monitor regional security incidents.

The Mechanism was created following talks in August 2025 in Doha that focused on prisoner exchanges and trust-building measures.

== Activities ==
From 13–17 April, representatives of the Congolese government and M23, an AFC-affiliated rebel group, met near Montreux, Switzerland, for the ninth round of peace talks under the Doha framework. At the conclusion of the negotiations, the DRC, M23, the African Union (AU), Qatar, Switzerland, and the United States issued a joint communiqué stating that significant progress had been made on the third component of the peace agreement. An MOU signed by the DRC, M23, and the ICGLR established procedures for implementing the ceasefire mechanism and incorporating M23 officers into the EJVM+. The ICGLR also committed to initiating preparations for the mechanism's first verification mission by 24 April, although no subsequent announcement confirmed that this planning had taken place.

In addition, the two sides signed a prisoner transfer agreement that outlined implementation procedures for the September 2025 prisoner exchange accord. According to M23 deputy spokesperson Oscar Balinda, speaking to The New Times, the government was expected to release roughly 300 M23 prisoners, while M23 would free more than 150 detainees held by the movement. This represented a reduction from M23's original demand for the release of 700 prisoners. On 16 April, La Libre Belgique reported that around 300 M23 detainees remained unaccounted for within the Congolese prison system. Although both parties agreed to complete the exchange by 28 April, the process reportedly encountered delays from the government side. M23 maintained that it was prepared to carry out the exchange. Radio France Internationale (RFI) reported on 29 April that the ICRC, tasked with facilitating the transfers, had not received the necessary authorization from Kinshasa despite all technical arrangements being completed. Diplomatic sources emphasized that the operation could not proceed without the government's formal approval. French media attributed the delay to legal requirements and administrative procedures, as well as political concerns surrounding the release of certain detainees. Reports from Congolese media also suggested that disagreement over the exchange location posed an additional obstacle, with M23 favoring a site in Uganda near North Kivu and the government advocating for Beni as the venue.

DRC and Rwanda convened in London on 24 June for the sixth meeting of the Joint Oversight Committee (JOC), alongside representatives from Qatar, Togo acting as the AU mediator, and the U.S. The meeting followed the fifth JOC session held on 23 April, which brought together the same participants to evaluate progress made since the 17–18 March meetings in Washington. During that session, both governments updated the Committee on measures taken to ease tensions and implement the peace agreement, while Qatar briefed participants on the ongoing Doha negotiations between the DRC and AFC. The Committee reaffirmed its strong support for the Doha process as an essential component of the broader peace framework, and the meeting concluded with the DRC and Rwanda reiterating their commitment to sustaining momentum toward peace while thanking the U.S., Qatar, Togo, and the AU Commission for their continued support.

At the sixth JOC meeting, the Congolese delegation presented an update on efforts to neutralize the FDLR, while Rwanda provided an overview of its ongoing withdrawal of troops and military assets from eastern DRC under the bilateral military framework established by the Washington Accords. The meeting's official communiqué noted that participants assessed developments since April and expressed serious concern about continued fighting, particularly the effects of drone strikes on civilians and ongoing peace initiatives. Both parties reaffirmed their commitment to implementing the accords in full, including compliance regarding drone operations, and agreed to work toward reducing tensions in Minembwe. They also endorsed measures to make the ceasefire verification mechanism operational and support the launch of its first monitoring mission. The DRC and Rwanda agreed to enhance intelligence sharing and develop a common understanding of the next phase of military operations through the Joint Security Coordination Mechanism (JSCM), with the next JSCM meeting scheduled within 15 days. The two countries pledged to support the successful conclusion of peace negotiations between the DRC and M23 and to avoid hostile rhetoric or actions, including political attacks, that could undermine mutual confidence or the implementation of the accords. Earlier, on 17 June, President Tshisekedi stated during a speech in the U.S. that the Congolese government would soon recapture Goma and Bukavu by force while criticizing Rwanda. On 18 June, Kanyuka responded via social media, arguing that Tshisekedi's statements violated "the spirit" of the Doha ceasefire process.
