= Recombinant vesicular stomatitis virus vaccines =

Recombinant vesicular stomatitis virus vaccines (rVSV vaccines) are vaccines made using recombinant Indiana vesiculovirus, including:

== Vaccines ==
- rVSV-ZEBOV vaccine against Ebola

== Vaccine candidates ==
- rVSV-SUDV vaccine, a candidate against Sudan ebolavirus
- rVSV-MARV vaccine, a candidate against the Marburg virus
- rVSV-based vaccine candidate against Lassa fever
- An HIV vaccine candidate
