= First Battle of Kitshanga =

2023 battle of the M23 campaign in the DRC

- Part of M23 campaign
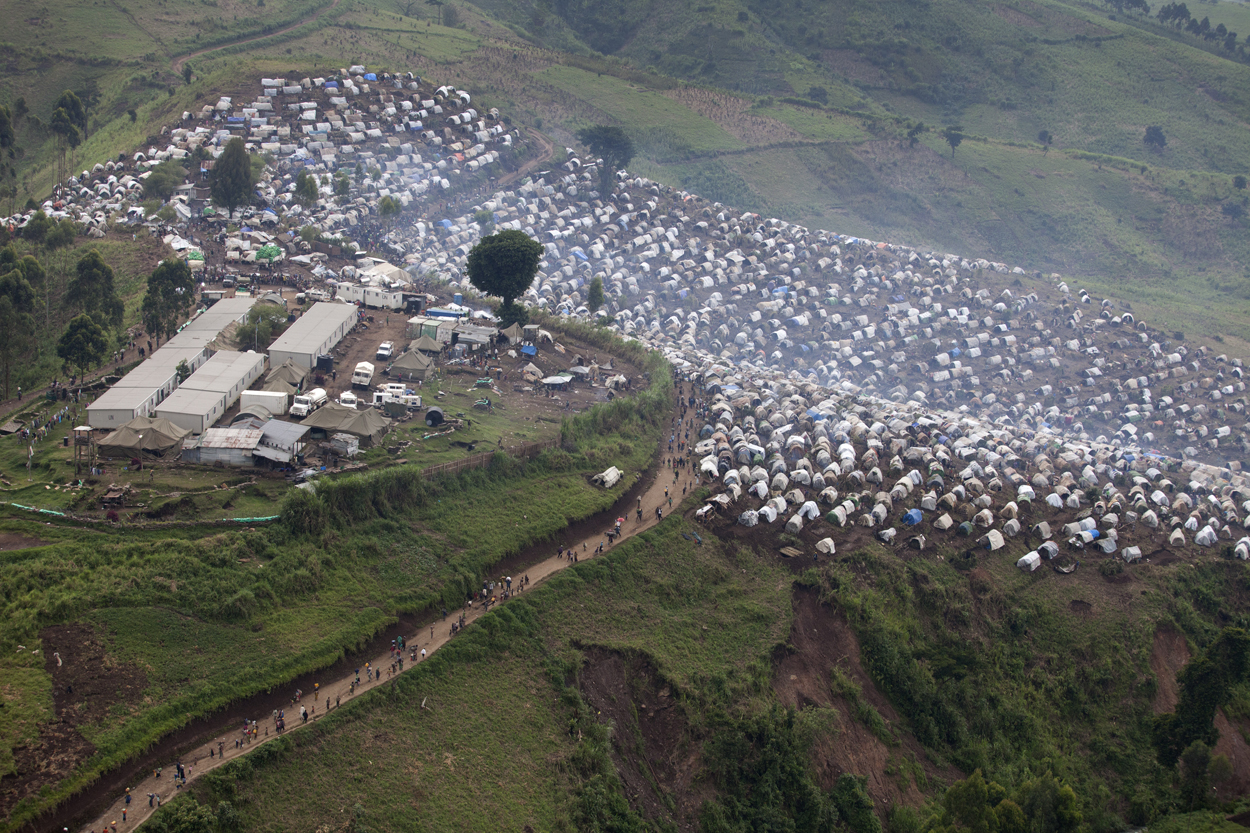
- The MONUSCO base in Kitshanga, just after the 2009 battle for the city.
| Date | January 24–26, 2023 |
| Location | Kitchanga and surrounding villages, North Kivu, Democratic Republic of the Congo |
| Result | M23 victory |

Belligerents
| DRC | March 23 Movement; Rwanda (per DRC) |

Commanders and leaders
| (Democratic Republic of the Congo) Félix Tshisekedi; Guidon Shimirai; Janvier Karairi (APCLS) | Sultani Makenga |

Units involved
| FARDC; NDC-R; APCLS-Kambuzi; Self-defense groups | M23 forces Rwandan Defence Force (per DRC) |

Casualties and losses
| Unknown | Unknown |
- Many killed 20,000+ displaced

Between January 24 and 26, 2023, M23 rebels and Armed Forces of the Democratic Republic of the Congo (FARDC) soldiers fought over the town of Kitshanga. The battle was part of the renewed M23 offensive, and ended on January 26 with M23 forces capturing the city. Civilians accused both M23 and FARDC-aligned militias of war crimes during and after the battle.

== Background ==
M23, which rose to prominence in 2012, is a Rwandan-backed Tutsi group that has been fighting the Congolese government in eastern Congo. Initially, the Congolese government (FARDC) defeated the group, but they saw a resurgence in late 2021. M23 launched an offensive in Rutshuru Territory in late 2022, capturing large swathes of territory in North Kivu. During their offensive, M23 attacked Bwito Chiefdom territory, capturing Bambo from FARDC and allied Mai-Mai militias in late December. Despite being urged by international pressure to retreat from Kibumba and Bwito territory in late December, M23 and Rwandan allies clashed with FARDC and Mai-Mai between December 26 and January 3. M23 also continued to take territory in these attacks. At a summit in Angola, regional leaders including Congolese president Félix Tshisekedi demanded for a second time the withdrawal of M23 from these territories on January 15. These calls came after the M23 withdrew from Rumangabo military base, but increased fighters in Kibumba.

Shelling in Kitshanga damaged civilian property on January 20, killing three people and injuring one. Other attacks hit churches and other civilian infrastructure. While the perpetrator of the shelling is unknown, it was suspected to be by M23.

== Battle ==
Fighting for Kitshanga broke out around 4am local time in the eastern outskirts of the city on January 24. The first attacks were directed against various militias defending the city, including APCLS-Kambuzi, NDC-R-Guidon, and FARDC in Uli. The FARDC contingent in Uli was hit first, with fighting raging in the northeastern part of the city. Residents in Bambo and Nyamilima reported reduced numbers of M23 fighters, signaling many went to Kitshanga to fight. By the end of January 24, FARDC and allied militias were able to push M23 to the outskirts of the city, where clashes intensified around villages like Rushembeshe. Many residents of Kitshanga fled the initial fighting towards refugee camps.

FARDC accused the Rwanda Defence Force (RDF) of aiding M23 in the fighting in Kitshanga. Colonel Guillaume Ndjike, a Congolese army spokesman, stated that the army was in control of Kitshanga and that fighting continued ten kilometers away from the city. The M23, however, continued trying to intercept the Goma-Butembo road, upon which traffic had ceased. By the morning of January 26, the frontline was located in the villages of Kilolirwe, Monastere, Kabale-Kasha, Burungu, and Tebero. Central Kitshanga, despite still being under FARDC and allied control, was quiet. However, much of the countryside surrounding the city was M23 controlled or under their influence. Displaced civilians fled to Mweso, Kashuga, Kalembe, and other villages in mountainsides surrounding the city. MONUSCO (United Nations Organization Stabilization Mission in the Democratic Republic of the Congo) took in 450 refugees.

M23 overran Kitshanga around 10am on January 26. Civilians speaking to the Associated Press stated that they saw M23 killing civilians throughout the city. Self-defense groups attempted to hold back the rebels, but were unsuccessful. M23 was in full control of Kitshanga by 4:45pm that day, and Congolese forces fled to Mweso.

== Aftermath ==
Fighting continued in Burungu and Kilolirwe after Kitshanga fell, although a spokesperson for a FARDC-allied militia claimed that FARDC and allies were still fighting in Kitshanga on January 27. Kilolirwe fell that same day. The Congolese army stated later on January 27 that they withdrew from the city. Civilians accused MONUSCO of not accepting refugees into the base near the city, which MONUSCO denied.

Civilians fleeing the fighting were raped and attacked by FARDC-aligned fighters in the villages around Kitshanga during the battle. The fighters were allegedly FDLR and Nyatura Abuzungu. The Congolese government accused the Rwandan Army of participating in the capture of the city, and perpetrating massacres against the civilians along with M23. The United Nations estimated that 20,000 civilians were displaced from Kitshanga and the surrounding villages.

FARDC recaptured Kitshanga in October 2023.
