= Freddy Kaniki =

Congolese doctor and politician

- Kaniki in 2025
- Education: National University of Rwanda (BS Pharm); University of Colorado Denver (PharmD)
- Medical career
- Field: Pharmacology, vaccinology
- Institutions: Eben-Ezer University of Minembwe; Burundi American International Academy; Indian Health Service

Secretary-General of the Front for the Refoundation of the Nation
- Incumbent
- Assumed office 12 October 2026
- Preceded by: Michel Rukunda

President of the Twirwaneho
- Incumbent
- Assumed office 1 July 2025

Deputy Coordinator of Economic, Financial, and Development Affairs of the Congo River Alliance
- In office c. 25 February 2025 – 14 October 2026

Political Commissioner of the Twirwaneho (Note: Kaniki is the Co-Founder of the Twirwaneho in addition to serving as its Political Commissioner before he became its President.)
- In office c. 2010s – 1 July 2025

Personal details
- Born: Freddy Kaniki Rukema; March 1974 (age 52) Eastern provinces, Zaire (now Democratic Republic of the Congo)
- Spouse: Esther Kaniki
- Website: https://www.freddykaniki.com

Freddy Kaniki Rukema (Note: Kaniki's name has been ordered as either Freddy Rukema Kaniki or Freddy Kaniki Rukema; in line with Congolese naming customs and Kaniki's personal website, the latter is used.) (born c. March 1974) is a Congolese doctor and politician. He served as the Political Commissioner for the Twirwaneho, a predominantly Banyamulenge rebel paramilitary group, before ultimately ascending to its President on 1 July 2025. Around 25 February 2026, he was selected to be a Deputy Coordinator for the Congo River Alliance rebel coalition and rival government; following its merger into the Front for the Refoundation of the Nation political-military coalition, Kaniki would assume the role of Secretary-General upon its inception.

== Early life and education ==
Kaniki was born a Tutsi in March 1974 in the eastern Democratic Republic of the Congo (DRC), belonging to a long family lineage born in the DRC. His father was a Pastor. Kaniki attended his primary and secondary education in the DRC, before attending the University of Rwanda (UNR) in Kigali from 1995 to 2000, where he graduated with a Bachelor of Science in Pharmacy (BS Pharm).

In late 1996, ethnic violence ensuing the Rwandan genocide gripped the African Great Lakes. On 22 September of that year, Kaniki's father and three younger brothers, the youngest of whom was 11, were killed by Hutu Zairian Armed Forces, who Kaniki claimed were targeted because they were ethnically Tutsi, Banyamulenge, and Congolese. Thereafter and following his graduation from UNR, Kaniki moved to the United States (US) sometime between 2001 and 2002, where he joined a group of refugees in Portland, Maine. Kaniki said he made the move because he "could'nt live there [in Rwanda] any longer and remain sane"—a realization he made while at UNR. Speaking no English at the time of his move, Kaniki would work in a meat packing plant, during which he met the Director of Pharmacy Operations at the Maine Medical Center (MMCP), Colleen Hoffman. She offered him a job at MMCP delivering medications; within four months, Kaniki was promoted to Pharmacy Technician.

From 2006 to 2010, Kaniki attended the University of Colorado Denver (CU Denver) where he graduated with a Doctorate's Degree in Clinical Pharmacy (PharmD). In 2005, he passed the North American Pharmacist Licensure Examination (NAPLEX).

== Career ==
=== Medical and professorial ===
In 2007, Kaniki joined the tribally-operated Maniilaq Association in Kotzebue, Alaska where he served as the Chief Pharmacist from as late as 2015 until approximately 2024, during which he also completed his postgraduate residency. Kaniki's wife, Esther, would join the Maniilaq Association in 2018. From around 2025 onwards, Kaniki has served as an Ambulatory Pharmacist.

Kaniki has been an Associate professor in the Department of Health Sciences at Eben-Ezer University of Minembwe in South Kivu, DRC since 2014.

==== Burundi American International Academy ====
Burundi American International Academy
- Bujumbura, Burundi H8RW+M22

Information
- Motto: Knowledge, Passion, Excellence
- Established: c. 2014
- President: Lazare Sebitereko Rukundwa

In the fall of 2014, Kaniki and his wife, Esther, founded and opened the Burundi American International Academy (BAIA) located on Lake Tanganyika within the capital city of Bujumbura, Burundi. It provides primary and secondary education and is accredited by the country's Ministry of Education—enrolling students internationally, including Burundians, Congolese, Americans, Indians, Kenyans, and more.

=== Political ===
==== AFC Deputy Coordinator and FRN Secretary-General ====
Kaniki publicly appeared as the Deputy Coordinator of Economic, Financial, and Development Affairs of the Congo River Alliance (French: Alliance Fleuve Congo; AFC), a Congolese rebel coalition, as early as 25 February 2025. On 25 February, he appeared alongside civilian president and leader of the Rwandan-backed rebel movement, the March 23 Movement (M23), Bertrand Bisimwa, and the AFC's founder a Corneille Nangaa—the latter of whom Kaniki worked closely with. Kaniki was appointed as the AFC/M23's deputy coordinator the response to the epidemic following its outbreak in May 2026. Kaniki also joined AFC/M23 leaders in diplomatic matters, including peace discussions with an African Union (AU) delegation in early October 2026.

Former Congolese president, Joseph Kabila, who had long been suspected of having ties with the AFC, founded the FRN on 12 October 2026, of which the AFC merged into. Kaniki was named as the FRN's Secretary-General. (Note: According to multiple sources, including Africa Confidential, Al Jazeera, Reuters, and Agenzia Fides.)

==== Political Commissioner and President of the Twirwaneho ====
During his time working as a pharmacist in Alaska, Kaniki reportedly retained connections with Banyamulenge community militias. Being a co-founder of the Twirwaneho, the most prevalent Banyamulenge rebel group—and also belonging to the FRN—he served as its Political Commissioner until he was appointed as the President on 1 July 2025. In March 2025, Kaniki said he "would not have become Twirwaneho, like all the Banyamulenge, if I was not hunted, if my community was not hunted," but said that unlike Nangaa, he "never had the ambition to take power."

== Views and political beliefs ==
=== Ethnic diversity and discrimination in the DRC ===
Kaniki has voiced support for the DRC's ethnic diversity, saying it is "a richness we must accept, appreciate, and exploit." He says "eradicating discrimination, intolerance, and cultivating living together" were "deeply rooted" in him since adulthood.

=== Twirwaneho and the Banyamulenge ===
In June 2026, when Twirwaneho fighters were torn between loyalty to the M23 and FARDC as fighting occurred in the M23 stronghold of Minembwe, South Kivu, (Note: By August 2023, reports indicated that the M23 had established contacts with Twirwaneho fighters in the highlands of Minembwe, as noted in a report by António Guterres, which raised concerns that renewed hostilities in North Kivu could open a second front in South Kivu and mobilize previously inactive armed groups. It would officially declare its aligned with the M23 in February 2025, following the death of Michel Rukunda—a FARDC officer which defected to the Twirwaneho in early 2024—in a government drone attack.) Kaniki argued that the FARDC had a track record of killing the Banyamulenge in addition to destroying their villages, burning their fields, and stealing their cattle. Following the FRN/M23's recapture of the village, Kaniki, Bisimwa, and Deputy Commander-in-Chief Brigadier General Bernard Byamungu made a trip to Minembwe in mid-July in a display of solidarity with its residents.

He has described Félix Tshisekedi and the DRC Government to have "a plan" and "ethnic cleansing campaign" aimed "to exterminate the Banyamulenge." (Note: Sources including Human Rights Watch (HRW), The New Humanitarian (TNH), the US Holocaust Memorial Museum, Zoryan Institute, and Next Century Foundation have reported that violence had been perpetrated by the FARDC, DRC-allied Wazalendo, and local Mai-Mai militias. Patricia Huon, a Uvira-based journalist writing for TNH, argued that "the M23 and Rwanda have weaponised that stigma, invoking threats against the community to justify their insurgency, which analysts say is more rooted in political, economic, and security interests than support for Tutsi civilians.") Kaniki said that "it's important that the world understand[s] that there are people who need protection and if they [the DRC Government] can't protect us, they cannot refuse us the right to protect ourselves. It's very important."

=== FRN/M23 insurgency ===
In August 2025, Kaniki called a Human Rights Watch (HRW) report investigating the execution of 140 civilians near Virunga National Park that July a "hoax." He criticized the source of the report's information, arguing that "it was just someone sitting in New York making phone calls and asking people how many people were killed" and that "nobody on the ground [came to] do an investigation." After implicating the HRW and Amnesty International's subsequent reporting on the attack and others by the M23 and Wazalendo as being part of "an agenda" and a "call for double genocide in Rwanda," Kaniki asked the United Nations Security Council (UNSC) to perform an independent investigation.

Kaniki has argued that the international response to the FRN/M23 insurgency has been biased, particularly blaming the US and other mediators.

== Publications ==
- Rukema Kaniki, Freddy; Jonathan, Redlinski; C. Mann, Denzel (October–December 2024). "Quantitative analysis of the impact of seasonal cyclicalityon serum 25-hydroxycholecalciferol concentrationin Northwest Arctic". International Journal of Nutrition, Pharmacology, Neurological Diseases. 14 (4): 416–424. doi:10.4103/ijnpnd.ijnpnd_106_24.
- Rukema Kaniki, Freddy; Olaniyi Sanni, Felix; Nindinde Kyampof, Kirota; R. Lazare, Sebitereko (October 2023). "A retrospective analysis of the trends in modern contraceptive use among adolescents and young women (15–24 years) in the Democratic Republic of the Congo in the last two decades". Journal of Family Medicine and Primary Care. 12 (10): 2260–2267. doi:10.4103/jfmpc.jfmpc_128_23. ISSN 2249-4863. PMC 10706545. PMID 38074248.
- Rukema Kaniki, Freddy; Felix Sanni, Olaniyi; Nindinde Kyampof, Kirota; Rukundwa Lazare, Sebitereko (August 2023). "Variation in antenatal health services utilisation among women of reproductive age in the Democratic Republic of the Congo". African Journal of Reproductive Health. 27 (8): 95–104. doi:10.29063/ajrh2023/v27i8.10 (inactive 12 November 2026) – via AJRH.
- Olaniyi Sanni, Felix; Olaiya Abiodun, Paul; Johnson Onoja, Ali; Abike Sanni, Elizabeth; Rukema Kaniki, Freddy (2022). "Impact of COVID-19 Lockdown on the Economy of a Low-Resource Setting". Health Management and Information Science. 9 (1): 9–15. doi:10.30476/JHMI.2022.93999.1111.
- Okolo, Chisara Slyvestina; Emelike, Felix; Olaniyi Sanni, Felix; Oriahoghen, C.; Oriahoghen, E.; Rukema Kaniki, Freddy; C. Okeke, Ndubuisi; Somuyiwa, G.; Odeyemi, S.O.; Eigege, IN; Umeji, L.C.; Ivo, A.E.; Ibrahim Musa, Tony; Otene, B.O.; Adenuga, M.A.; Ogundele, T.; Umeji, Charity (2020). "Assessment of Haematological Parameters of Pregnant and Non-Pregnant Women in a Tertiary Health Institution in Abuja, Nigeria". International Journal of Basic, Applied and Innovative Research. 9 (2): 36–42. eISSN 2384-681X. ISSN 2315-5388 – via ResearchGate.
- Timilehin Michael, Omole; Abiodun Paul, Olaiy; Wade, Djibril; Rukema Kaniki, Freddy; Stephen Ayosanmi, Oluwasola; Olumide Faith, Ajani; Olusegun, Aturaka; Olaniyi Felix, Sanni; Zachary Terna, Gwa; Lateef Afelumo, Olaide; Aidan, Jimmy; Love Adeiye, Ajani; Musa, Abdulsalam (November 2019). "Blockchain and Big Data Analytics in the Optimization of Nigeria Vaccine Supply Chain". Global Scientific Journals. 7 (11): 1212–1221 – via ResearchGate.
- Zachary Terna, Gwa; Timileyin Michael, Omole; Abiodun Paul, Olaiya; Stephen Ayosanmi, Oluwasola; Olusegun, Aturaka; Rukema Kaniki, Freddy; Wade, Djibril; Olumide Faith, Ajani; Musa, Abdulsalam; Lateef Afelumo, Olaide; Aiden, Jimmy; Love Adeiye, Ajani; Olaniyi Felix, Sanni; Chigoze Godwin, Njemanze (November 2019). "Thermostable Vaccines in the Optimization of African Vaccine Supply Chain, the Perspective of the Nigerian Health Supply Chain Professionals". Global Scientific Journal. 7 (11): 1377–1386. ISSN 2320-9186 – via ResearchGate.
- Love Adeiye, Ajani; Olumide Faith, Ajani; Olaniyi Felix, Sanni; Olaiya Paul, Abiodun; Onyebuchi Nwofe, Justin; Freddy Rukema, Kaniki; Kafi Mallak, Shadi (25 December 2019). "Expanding access to viral load testing in Nigeria; the impact of third party logistics". International Journal of Community Medicine and Public Health. 7 (1): 28. doi:10.18203/2394-6040.ijcmph20195828. ISSN 2394-6040.
- Timilehin Michael, Omole; Abiodun Paul, Olaiya; Olaniyi Felix, Sanni; Rukema Kaniki, Freddy; Stephen Ayosanmi, Oluwasola; Wade, Djibril; Olusegun, Aturaka; Olumide Faithe, Ajani; Zachary Terna, Gwa; Abdulsalam, Musa; Love Adeiye, Ajani; Lateef Olaide, Afelumo (November 2019). "Additive Manufacturing/3D in the Optimization of Nigeria Vaccine Supply Chain". International Journal of Scientific and Research Publications. 9 (11): 261–267. doi:10.29322/IJSRP.9.11.2019.p9529. ISSN 2250-3153 – via IJSRP.
- Timilehin Michael, Omole; Olusegun, Aturaka; Abiodun Paul, Olaiya; Olaniyi Felix, Sanni; Rukema Kaniki, Freddy; Stephen Ayosanmi, Oluwasola; Wade, Djibril; Olumide Faith, Ajani; Zachary Terna, Gwa; Musa, Abdulsalam; Lateef Afelumo, Olaide; Aiden, Jimmy; Love Adeiye, Ajani (October 2019). "The Use of UAV/Drones in the Optimization of Nigeria Vaccine Supply Chain" (PDF). International Journal of Scientific & Engineering Research. 10 (10): 1273–12279 – via UAV for Payload Delivery Working Group.
- Rukema Kaniki, Freddy (August 2019). "Factors influencing the use of modern contraceptive methods among rural women of child bearing age in the Democratic Republic of the Congo". Journal of Family Medicine and Primary Care. 8 (8): 2582–2586. doi:10.4103/jfmpc.jfmpc_345_19. PMC 6753799. PMID 31548936.

== Awards ==
- Indian Health Service (IHS) — 2018 Director's Award, Individual
