= Front for the Refoundation of the Nation =

Rebel group in the Democratic Republic of the Congo

- Front pour la Refondation de la Nation
- Other name: FRN
- Founding leader: Joseph Kabila
- Deputy leaders: Sultani Makenga; Bertrand Bisimwa; Corneille Nangaa
- Secretary General: Freddy Kaniki
- Founded: 12 October 2026
- Dates active: 12 October 2026–present
- Merger of: March 23 Movement; Congo River Alliance; Twirwaneho; RED-Tabara
- Country: Democratic Republic of the Congo
- Active regions: North Kivu; South Kivu
- Status: Active
- Wars: Kivu conflict
- Website: https://www.frn-rdcongo.com/

The Front for the Refoundation of the Nation, French: Front pour la Refondation de la Nation, (FRN) is a political-military coalition in the Democratic Republic of the Congo that was founded on 12 October 2026. Led by Joseph Kabila, it includes the Congo River Alliance and the March 23 Movement.

== Background ==
Territorial control in eastern Democratic Republic of Congo in May 2025

The Democratic Republic of the Congo (DRC) has faced insurgency from armed groups in the east for more than 30 years, tracing back to the 1994 Rwandan genocide and ensuing conflict. In the aftermath of the Second Congo War, the March 23 Movement (M23) militant group emerged from Congolese Tutsi militias. Starting in 2022, a Rwandan-backed offensive by the M23 saw the capture by M23 of much of North and South Kivu, including the provincial capitals of Goma and Bukavu, as well as civilian massacres. During this time, DRC elections commissioner Corneille Nangaa left the DRC government and formed the Congo River Alliance (AFC), which allied itself with M23. In a June 2026 report, Human Rights Watch accused M23 and Rwandan soldiers of "murder, torture and other ill-treatment, corporal punishment, forced unlawful recruitment and abusive labor, and use of child soldiers", which it called war crimes.

Joseph Kabila was president of the DRC from the assassination of his father in 2001 until 2019 with the election of Félix Tshisekedi. Initially, under a reported power-sharing agreement, Tshisekedi's cabinet included allies of Kabila; this collapsed as Tshisekedi began removing Kabila's allies in 2020, and his government launched corruption investigations against Kabila in 2023 which forced him into exile.

In 2025, Kabila visited Goma under M23 occupation. While he denied involvement with the group and Rwanda, a DRC military court sentenced him to death in absentia for treason, war crimes and crimes against humanity over his alleged involvement.

== History ==
Former Congolese president Joseph Kabila announced the formation of the group, with himself at the head, at a news conference at his residence in Goma on 12 October 2026. Other leaders named included AFC leader Corneille Nangaa and M23 president Bertrand Bisimwa, named vice presidents. M23 chief of staff Sultani Makenga was named army chief; Freddy Kaniki, a senior M23 health official, was named secretary-general, with Benjamin Bonimpa as deputy secretary-general.

The group claims to have a mission to "unite and coordinate all resistance forces in order to put an end to tyranny by all means, including force", ostensibly meaning overthrowing the internationally recognised Congolese government led by President Félix Tshisekedi. FRN advisor Claude Ibalanky situated the group as per Article 64 of the DRC constitution, which calls for Congolese to oppose unconstitutional regimes.

In its first official statement, on 14 October the FRN announced the formal dissolution of the AFC. FRN said it took on "all the rights, obligations and commitments" of the AFC, including those from the Doha Framework.

== Response ==
On 15 October, DRC interior minister Jacquemain Shabani announced a ban of activities for 13 political parties—including Kabila's People's Party for Reconstruction and Democracy—citing national security. Other parties banned included those led by Matata Ponyo, Seth Kikuni, and Claudel Lubaya. On the same day, DRC defense minister Guy Kabombo Muadiamvita ordered the suspension of foreign travel for DRC military officers. Tanzania Times reported speculation that this was meant to stop defections, but noted a lack of public evidence of this intent. Alain Uaykani of Al Jazeera separately noted a risk that Kabila's position as former army chief could lead to defections.

In its first joint statement since the announcement of the FRN, on 27 October the opposition C64 coalition called for dialogue instead of military action. It said it would try to meet with Kabila and Tshisekedi.

=== Analysis ===
Speaking to the BBC, Central Africa Director of Human Rights Watch, Lewis Mudge, said Kabila's announcement was "very very significant" in that "it formalizes him, being the former head of state, as being at the head of this rebellion." Yvon Muya of the University of Ottawa said the nature of the announcement suggested it was likely to be followed by military escalation.

Bram Verelst of the Institute for Security Studies said the main threat was to Qatar-mediated talks between the DRC and M23-AFC in Doha; speaking to Al Jazeera, he predicted "a hardening of Kinshasa's position toward the rebel movement and Kabila, including efforts to isolate Kabila and FRN regionally". ModernGhana columnist Mustapha Bature Sallama described three complications for the Doha talks:

The rebels now speak with a political voice that claims national legitimacy, not only local grievances. A death sentence hangs over their president, which makes any amnesty or power-sharing deal harder. And regional backers stay in the frame: the US and UN accuse Rwanda of backing the M23, and Uganda has also been accused. Rwanda denies it.

== Member groups ==
The following groups are known to be members of the Front for the Refoundation of the Nation:

- Congo River Alliance which included:
  - PARECO
  - Kyahanda
  - FPDC
  - Movement of Republicans for the Dignity of Peoples–Twirwaneho
  - Patriotic Resistance Front of Ituri
  - Chini ya Kilima
  - Zaïre-FPAC
  - RED-Tabara
  - National Forces of Liberation (FNL)
  - Action for the Dignity of Congo and its People
  - Nduma Defense of Congo-Renovated
- March 23 Movement

== Leadership ==
The leaders of the Front for the Refoundation of the Nation are as follows:

- Leader: His Excellency Joseph Kabila - former president of the Democratic Republic of Congo between 2001 and 2019
- Deputy leader: Corneille Nangaa - leader of the Congo River Alliance
- Deputy leader: Bertrand Bisimwa - leader of the March 23 Movement
- Chief of staff: Sultani Makenga - military chief of the March 23 Movement
- Secretary general: Freddy Kaniki, leader of Twirwaneho

Provincial governors

The FRN has appointed the following governors for the parts of North Kivu and South Kivu that they control:

- Bahati Musanga Erasto - FRN appointed governor for North Kivu
- Patrick Busu Bwangwi - FRN appointed governor for South Kivu
