= Kagogo ambush =

- Part of Kivu conflict
Date	January 4, 2022
Location	Kagogo, South Kivu, Democratic Republic of Congo
Result	Indecisive

Belligerents
FARDC	Twiganeho-Makanika

Casualties and losses
6 killed (per Kivu Security Tracker); 2 killed (per FARDC); 5 injured (per FARDC)	7 killed (per Kivu Security Tracker); 18 killed (per FARDC)

On January 4, 2022, militiamen from the Twiganeho-Makanika armed group ambushed a convoy of Congolese soldiers in the village of Kagogo, South Kivu, Democratic Republic of the Congo.

== Prelude ==
The Banyamulenge are Tutsi people from South Kivu, Democratic Republic of the Congo, and of the fifty active rebel groups in the state, two are predominantly Banyamulenge. These are the Twiganeho, backed by Rwanda, and the Ngumino.

The Twiganeho-Makanika primarily operate in the area of Fizi Territory, against Bembe, Fuliro, and Nyindu communities, in communal conflicts. On November 24, 2021, a Twiganeho-Makanika ambush injured two FARDC soldiers in Kagogo. On December 28, 2021, fighting between the Congolese Army (FARDC) and the Twiganeho-Makanika killed a colonel, three Congolese soldiers, and twelve pro-Congolese militants.

== Ambush ==
While traveling through the village of Kagogo, a group of Congolese reinforcements were ambushed by Twiganeho-Makanika on January 4. The ambush sparked a battle, where the Congolese military stated it killed 18 militiamen and lost two soldiers, with five being injured. Another ambush by the Twiganeho-Makanika occurred in the nearby village of Ishenge as well.

Later, ACLED stated that 13 people were killed in the clashes. The Kivu Security Tracker corroborated this, assessing that seven rebels were killed and six FARDC soldiers were killed.

== Aftermath ==
The Twiganeho-Makanika ambushed FARDC a second time in Kagogo on January 18, killing five Twiganeho-Makanika fighters and three FARDC soldiers.
