= Twirwaneho =

Rebel group in the Democratic Republic of Congo

Movement of Republicans for the Dignity of Peoples - Twirwaneho
- Other name: Twirwaneho
- Founding leader: Rabani Ntagendererwa Musemakwel
- Leader: Freddy Kaniki
- Dates active: Early 2010s – Present
- Headquarters: Mulenge, South Kivu, DRC
- Part of: Congo River Alliance; Front for the Refoundation of the Nation
- Wars: Kivu conflict; M23 campaign (2022–present)

Twirwaneho (Kinyarwanda for "let's defend ourselves"), officially the Movement of Republicans for the Dignity of Peoples (MRDP or MRDP–Twirwaneho) is a rebel paramilitary group operating in the South Kivu province of the Democratic Republic of the Congo. MRDP–Twirwaneho is composed primarily of members of the Banyamulenge community.

The group was established in the early 2010s as a self-defense militia formed to counter ethnic violence, land conflicts, and attacks by rival armed factions, notably the Mai-Mai. Although it waned around 2009, it reappeared in 2015 under David Muhoza Ndahigima, also known as "El Shabaab", during a resurgence of insecurity in South Kivu's highlands. Under his leadership, MRDP–Twirwaneho transformed from a defensive militia into a more structured armed organization carrying out offensive operations against opposing militias and ethnic groups. Its ranks expanded over time to include ex-combatants, diaspora members, and allied fighters, with support from transnational Banyamulenge networks. Beginning in 2018, it became a key participant in escalating violence across Uvira Territory, Fizi Territory, and Mwenga Territory, engaging in clashes with Mai-Mai coalitions, fighting Armed Forces of the Democratic Republic of the Congo (FARDC) units, and interacting with Burundian and Rwandan armed groups. Reports by the United Nations Security Council have linked MRDP–Twirwaneho to serious human rights abuses, including killings, displacement of civilians, and sexual violence.

Following 2020, the group expanded and became more centralized, especially after former FARDC officer Michel Rukunda ("Makanika") joined its ranks. By 2023, it had affiliated with the Congo River Alliance (AFC), and in February 2025, it aligned with the Rwandan-backed March 23 Movement, taking part in joint military operations. MRDP–Twirwaneho's president, Freddy Kaniki Rukema, serves as the AFC's deputy coordinator of economic, financial, and development affairs, while Charles Sematama is the group's military commander.

== History ==
=== Late 2000s: Origins, agropastoral tensions, and the rise of local self-defense forces ===
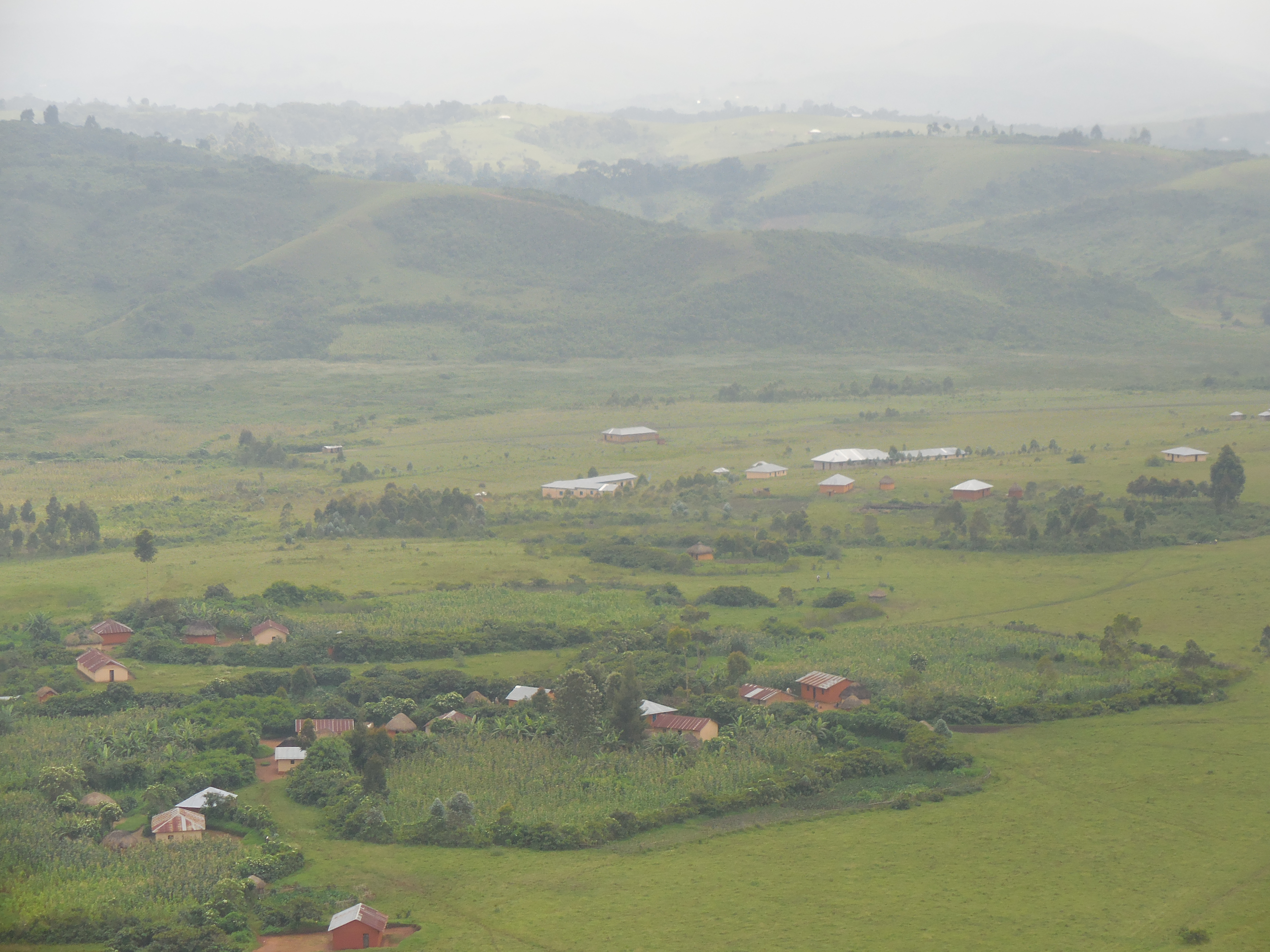
Aerial view of Eben-Ezer University of Minembwe

In the late 2000s, the Banyamulenge political-military movement Forces républicaines fédéralistes (FRF), the FARDC 112th Brigade, and various Mai-Mai factions became increasingly involved in local conflict dynamics, largely due to their close personal and familial ties with customary authorities. These relationships often obscured the line between political leadership and armed mobilization. For example, the Bembe groupement chief of Basimunyaka-Nord, Nuhu Mwenelwata-Selemani Munyaka, was a prominent figure in disputes with the Banyamulenge and maintained close links with Mai-Mai commander Aoci. He reportedly encouraged Aoci to resist disarmament and to continue cattle raids against Banyamulenge herders on the Mibunda Plain, from which he personally benefited through a share of the proceeds. Between 2009 and 2010, such raids intensified and led to repeated clashes between Aoci's forces and the FRF, which sought to defend Banyamulenge livestock. Similar tensions arose in Minembwe, where, in 2008, Mai-Mai groups led by Mulumba and Assani Ngungu carried out large-scale cattle raids near Kitumba despite the presence of the 112th Brigade. These incidents strengthened perceptions among Banyamulenge herders that existing security arrangements were inadequate, and, in response, they supported the creation of a local self-defense force known as "Twirwaneho", which was led by Rabani Ntagendererwa Musemakweli. Unlike conventional rebel groups, this group operated intermittently, with members remaining in their villages and mobilizing only when necessary. Inspired by earlier local militias such as the Abagirye during the Simba rebellion, Twirwaneho conducted counterattacks against Mai-Mai groups in 2008–2009 before gradually dissolving. Nonetheless, a similarly named group would re-emerge nearly a decade later in the Bijombo groupement of Uvira Territory as a more organized armed movement.

Cattle raiding has remained a central driver of violence on the Plateaux, as it is used by armed groups as a tactic in conflict and as a way to respond to wider tensions between farmers and herders. These tensions are linked to different social and cultural views about land and livestock. The Banyamulenge, who own most of the cattle in the area, depend heavily on livestock for their economy and way of life, while other communities place more importance on land, which they often associate with their ancestral heritage and spiritual guardianship. These differences lead to repeated conflicts, especially during transhumance, when cattle are moved seasonally to grazing areas such as Lulenge and Ngandja. During these migrations, cattle often damage crops, which creates complaints from farmers, especially when compensation payment, known as itulo, is not paid or is disputed. In the past, such issues were handled through customary systems, but these have weakened and led to more frequent tensions. Mai-Mai groups have capitalized on these frustrations by framing cattle raiding as a form of self-defense against perceived encroachments by pastoralists, sometimes even portraying transhumance itself as an invasion of indigenous land, which thus helps them mobilize support among farming communities. At the same time, cattle raiding has become a strategic tool in the conflict that targets the Banyamulenge's economic foundations while also serving as a means of internal discipline within armed groups. Banyamulenge armed groups, in turn, have gained support by defending their herds and have increasingly carried out counter-raids against other communities. Cattle raiding has also become an important source of income. The relatively high market value of cattle has incentivized participation in looting, taxation of herds in transit, and the establishment of checkpoints by armed groups. This has led to the growth of an illegal economy based on stolen cattle, including their transport, sale, and the use of forged documentation or bribes to make the trade possible. Some FARDC members are believed to be involved in this system, either by not stopping raids, allowing stolen cattle to pass, or taking part in the trade. This has increased distrust among the Banyamulenge, while other communities accuse certain army officers, particularly those perceived as having ties to pastoralist groups, of partiality in protecting livestock. As a result, trust in state institutions has weakened, and many communities now rely more on armed groups to protect their interests.

=== 2011: FRF–FARDC integration, failed integration of Mai-Mai factions, and Richard Tawimbi's Gumino ===
Following negotiations held on the Plateaux in 2011, the FRF and the FARDC reached an agreement that led to the dissolution of the FRF as a political-military movement. As part of this deal, FRF fighters were integrated into the national army, initially within a new structure called the 44th sector under the Amani Leo operations. Most FRF officers retained their ranks, and several were appointed to key positions within this sector. The movement was also expected to be transformed into a political party that would continue to pursue its political goals, including issues related to the status of Minembwe. This agreement was influenced by exhaustion from years of conflict among both the FRF and the Banyamulenge population, the political ambitions of FRF leaders, government efforts to stabilize the country before the 2011 elections, and pressure from Rwanda, which suspected the FRF of having links with opposition figures such as General Faustin Kayumba Nyamwasa. The dissolution of the FRF created uncertainty among Mai-Mai groups, many of which had justified their armed presence as a response to the perceived threat posed by the FRF. Some groups, such as Mulumba's faction, had also argued that they would only consider laying down arms if the FRF was dissolved. In this context, several Mai-Mai factions, including those led by Kapopo and Mushombe, attempted to pursue a similar integration process into the FARDC to obtain positions within the 44th sector to balance what they saw as Banyamulenge influence, securing formal recognition of their ranks, and gaining important roles within the army. However, these efforts had limited success. Kapopo managed to integrate with only a small number of fighters, while many of his troops refused to be deployed far from their home areas or returned to Itombwe, partly due to concerns about leaving their communities without protection. Local authorities also opposed their departure for the same reasons.

Efforts to integrate the group of Fuliru leader Mushombe Muganguzi based in North Bijombo also did not succeed. Although some Fuliru politicians appear to have reorganized and strengthened the group specifically in anticipation of FARDC integration, which they hoped to use the process to enhance their political standing before elections, the group "was not a complete fabrication", as Mushombe had intermittently mobilized fighters in a loose structure depending on security conditions. In 2011, the group was reorganized again, with Mushombe supported by Célestin Kashama Ngoy (also known as Kashologozi), a former Mai-Mai officer and FARDC captain, and Ilunga Lusesema (aka Kilofoka), a former company commander in Nakabaka's Mai-Mai forces. Encouraged by political sponsors, the group's ambitions grew too large, and prolonged negotiations failed to produce results. The situation was complicated by unclear signals from some political and military actors involved in the talks, who had little incentive to conclude them since they benefited financially from related funding. Another key factor was the army's "regimentation" reform, which aimed to convert FARDC brigades into regiments. Many ex–Mai-Mai officers were excluded from key positions in these new structures, which they often attributed to alleged Rwandophone dominance within the army. Feeling marginalized, many defected and joined Mushombe's group. Similar frustrations fueled other Mai-Mai defections. For example, Fuliru officer Kazadi left the Kilombwe regimentation center in Fizi Territory and later joined Mulumba's faction, where he proclaimed himself a general. Another beneficiary of these defections was the group of "Colonel" Chochi Buzimya Muchanga, who was based in the Moyens Plateaux of Milimba in Fizi Territory. He justified his armed struggle primarily by citing the Banyamulenge threat, stating that one must strike early before being struck. Influenced by young Fuliru intellectuals, the group adopted the name "Biloze Bishambuke", meaning in Kifuliiru "if we must destroy, let us destroy". It also received support from certain FARDC officers, including Colonel Justin Kanyonyi (aka Okapi), a former member of Assani Ngungu's Mai-Mai. Only the FRF was fully integrated into the FARDC in 2011. This created imbalances in the military sector of the Plateaux and generated new security tensions. As FARDC units largely composed of Banyamulenge soldiers conducted operations against Mai-Mai groups, insurgent mobilization increased. The situation worsened further when many FARDC units were withdrawn for the regimentation process. Combined with renewed Mai-Mai activity, these developments contributed to the remobilization of a Banyamulenge dissident faction led by former FRF officer Richard Tawimbi in 2011. With Shaka Alexis Nyamusaraba and Mugaza Semahurungure Kimasa as deputies, the group established its headquarters in the Bijombo groupement.

Tawimbi, who had earlier served in a senior role within the FRF, declined to join the FARDC after reportedly escaping detention in Bujumbura. His escape is said to have been facilitated by individuals linked to Rwandan intelligence services, who allegedly suspected him of maintaining contacts with the Rwandan dissident General Kayumba Nyamwasa. Through the bribery of prison staff, the former FRF members managed to secure his release, and once back in Congo, Tawimbi still refused integration into the FARDC, citing security concerns given that Kigali was reportedly pressing for his arrest and extradition to Rwanda. He also disagreed with the terms of the FRF's integration agreement, believing that by merging its military wing first without firm political guarantees, the movement had forfeited its leverage to advance its broader political objectives. He argued that integration had not improved relations between communities, noting that it had failed to bring reconciliation or enhance Banyamulenge security. He pointed to continued killings of Banyamulenge civilians in places such as Fizi Territory, Basimwenda (Itombwe sector, Mwenga Territory), and Lusuku, despite the FRF's incorporation into the army, insisting that reconciliation should have preceded integration. Although Tawimbi's new armed movement, the Mouvement populaire pour le changement du Congo (MPCC), which initially aimed to cooperate with other community-based armed groups, including Mai-Mai factions, this collaboration ultimately did not materialize, and as a result, the group came to be perceived as a continuation or "FRF-bis", essentially a Banyamulenge militia defending its own community and therefore seen as a threat by other groups on the Plateaux. This perception was reinforced by the fact that, like the FRF, the group became locally known as "Gumino". In this way, Tawimbi's faction unintentionally revived Mai-Mai narratives of emphasizing self-defense.

=== 2011–2016: Leadership conflicts in Bijombo, Mai-Mai Makuba, and reemergence of Twirwaneho ===
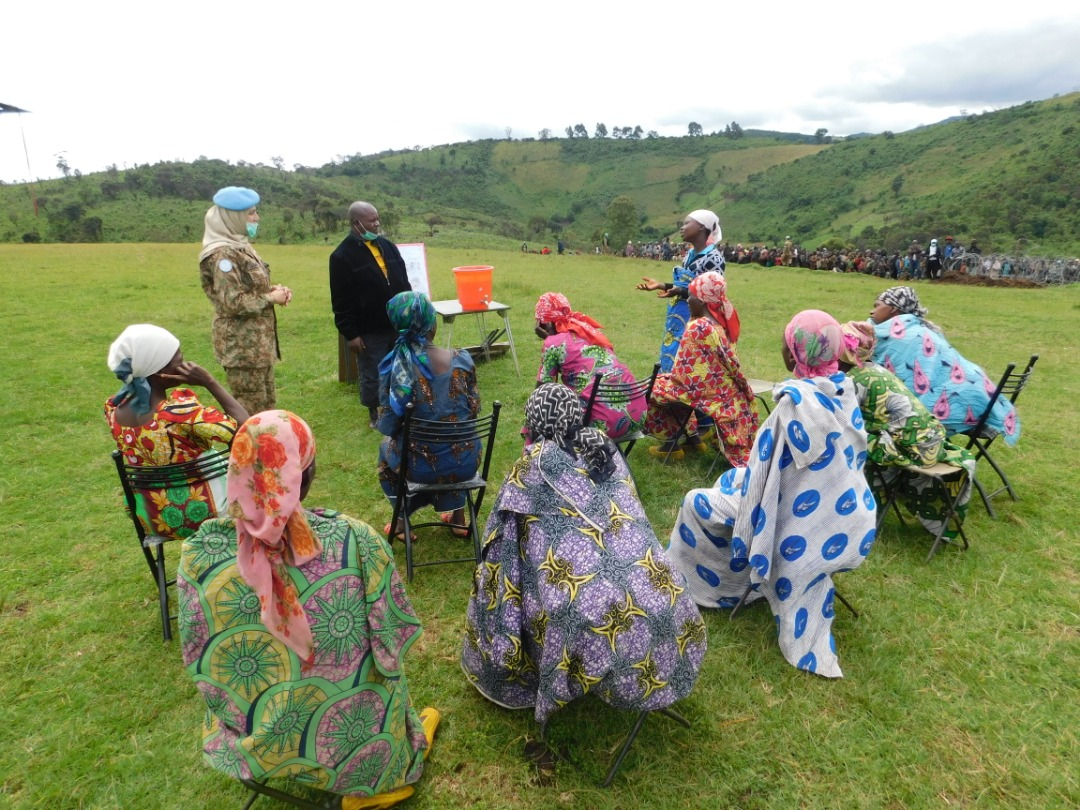
The Bijombo groupement of Bavira Chiefdom in Uvira Territory

The arrival of Tawimbi's group had significant consequences in Bijombo, where it established its headquarters in Kajembwe village, but its presence deepened existing tensions linked to local authority and competition over power. Armed groups became increasingly involved in disputes over customary leadership and control of Bijombo. The Banyamulenge recognize Kabarule, who was an important figure in the 1960s recognition of the groupement, as the legitimate authority, mainly governing southern Bijombo from Chanzovu. The Nyindu and Fuliru recognize Tete Amisi, a Nyindu leader based in Masango/Miramba, who administers the northern part. This ambiguity is partly sustained by the Vira mwami, Edmond Lenghe Lwegereza, who has repeatedly appointed interim chiefs. Rather than clarifying legitimate authority, he has pursued a "divide-and-rule policy" that strengthens his control over the area while also allowing him to profit from appointing multiple leaders. Another factor worsening tensions is his acceptance of the proliferation of villages (localités) within Bijombo. The groupement initially had 18 villages, but during the First and Second Congo Wars, an additional 14 were created. Many of these new settlements did not have official recognition, and control over several remains was contested. They are also marked by persistent land and boundary disputes due to unclear demarcations.

Conflicts in Bijombo stem from intercommunity rivalry, economic interests, and competition for leadership. The Banyamulenge have long sought to establish control over the groupement as a pathway to securing their own customary governance and have focused on areas where they are numerically dominant. Other communities have largely resisted these efforts to limit Banyamulenge political authority and to retain control over tax revenues, which are collected by whichever chiefs are locally acknowledged, and the same applies to revenues from weekly markets, which go exclusively to the acknowledged authority in each area. While such disputes exist across Bijombo, their intensity varies depending on the behavior and strategies of local leaders. Some leaders rely more heavily on armed groups to strengthen their positions, which makes conflicts more volatile. Around 2010, a Mai-Mai group emerged under Fuliru commander Makuba Yenga Yenga, composed mainly of Nyindu and Fuliru fighters. They justified their mobilization by citing threats from the FRF, and accused it of looting crops and mistreating civilians. Their activity intensified after a FARDC unit largely made up of former FRF fighters committed abuses during operations against them. A Joint Investigative Team from MONUSCO and the military prosecutor's office documented serious violations, including the rape of seven women and the looting of a health center and homes, attributing responsibility to Major Rupongo Rogatien John and Major Shaka Nyamusaraba, who were originally from Kajembwe. Facing potential prosecution and a problematic service record, Nyamusaraba eventually deserted the FARDC and joined Tawimbi's group, where he became deputy commander.

The Mai-Mai Makuba played an active role in the dispute between Sadoc Kazinguvu Bidagara, the Banyamulenge chief of Kajembwe, and Gahusa Anzuluni Byamungu, the Nyindu chief of Kikozi. The conflict was mainly about unclear village boundaries, which were themselves linked to the dispute over the limits between Bijombo and Kalungwe groupements. It was also fueled by disagreements over tax collection from the Tuesday market in Kikozi and by competing claims over land use. Historically, the disputed area of Kikozi had been used by Banyamulenge herders as grazing land. During the war period, however, the Nyindu and Fuliru populations settled there and began cultivating maize. The Banyamulenge viewed this expansion of farming as an encroachment on their traditional grazing areas, and as a result, they were reluctant to restrict the movement of their cattle, which at times damaged cultivated fields while passing through the area.

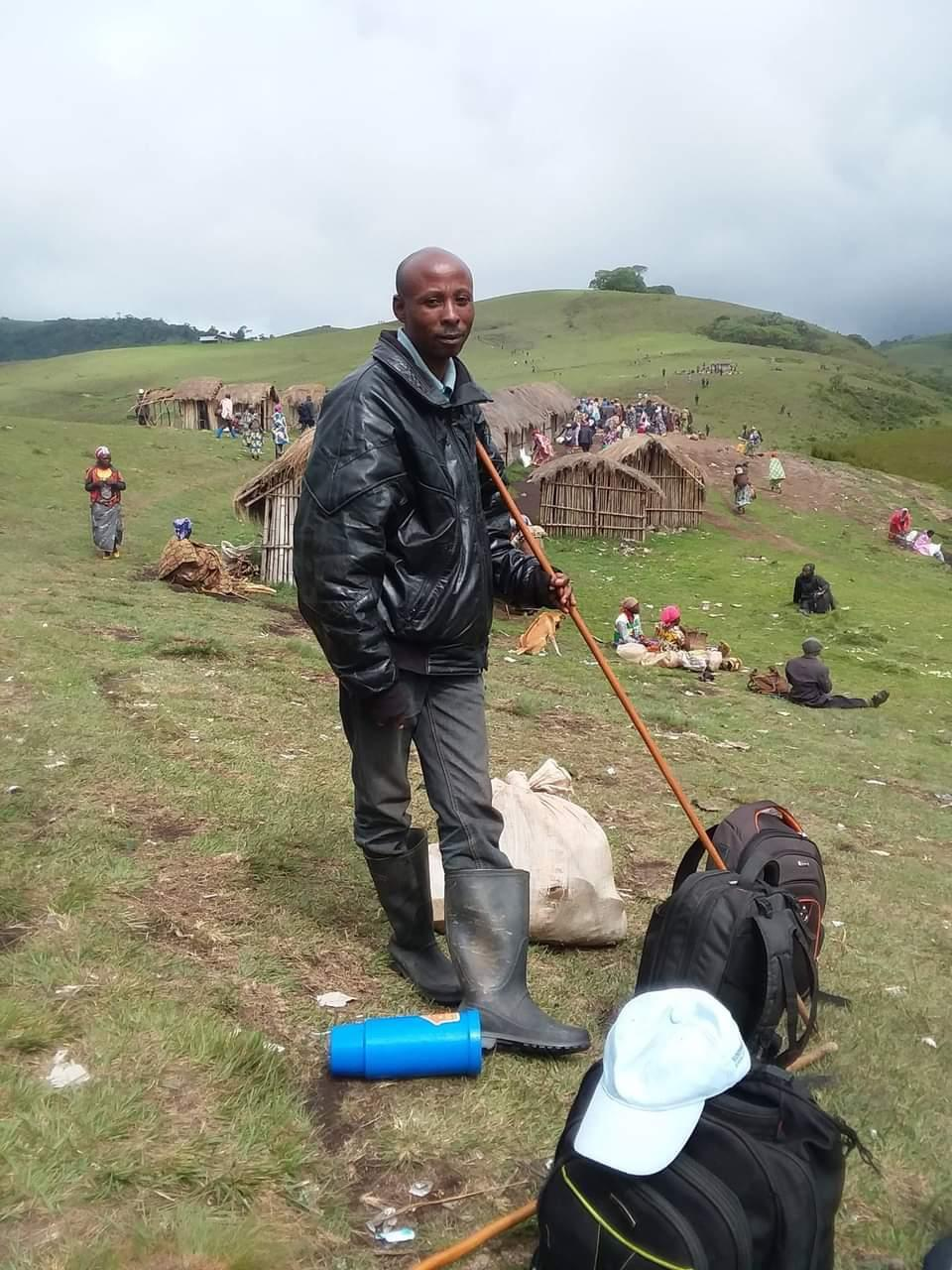
Fuliru herdsman in the Mitamba market of Bijombo

The Mai-Mai Makuba's presence strengthened Gahusa's position in the dispute. With their backing, he was able to collect taxes at the Tuesday market and assert greater control over the area. According to Judith Verweijen, Juvénal Twaibu, Moïse Ribakare, Paul Bulambo, and Freddy Mwambi Kasongo, it is likely that Chief Sadoc agreed to allow Tawimbi's group to establish its headquarters in Kajembwe, as this provided him with armed support for local protection. Over time, Tawimbi's group expanded its influence across much of Bijombo groupement, even though Tawimbi himself was not physically present in the area. In 2012, Tawimbi travelled to Kinshasa at the invitation of General Delphin Kahimbi to discuss the possible integration of his group into the FARDC, but this process did not materialize, and he attributed the failure to a lack of serious engagement from the FARDC leadership, while at the same time he is reported to have begun cooperating with the military intelligence services, using his international contacts. His actual level of control over the group in Bijombo became increasingly unclear, as operations on the ground continued under the leadership of Shaka Nyamusharaba. Although the group maintained that Tawimbi remained their leader, Tawimbi himself gave mixed signals about his involvement. This unclear leadership structure contributed to a gradual decline in discipline within the Gumino, which increasingly engaged in abusive practices against civilians, including the installation of roadblocks on market days to collect illegal taxes, particularly along routes leading to Hwehwe, Bijombo, Kahuna, and Mitamba markets. It was also accused of intervening in local disputes through arbitrary arrests and the imposition of fines. These practices generated growing resentment among the youths from different communities and led to the creation of a multi-ethnic local defense force composed of Banyamulenge, Fuliru, and Nyindu members in early 2015. The initiative received support from several local leaders, including Banyamulenge chiefs such as Gasosi Semandwa of Kahuna II, one of the few Banyamulenge leaders who supported Tete Amisi as groupement chief, and Nkunzigoma of Kashigo (Murenze), but by March 2015, internal distrust among members led to divisions within the group. The Banyamulenge faction withdrew and formed a separate force under the name Twirwaneho, led by "Colonel" David Muhoza Ndahigima (also known as "Al Shabaab") from Kagogo and his deputy Mararo, both former Gumino members. The remaining Fuliru and Nyindu members reorganized into a Mai-Mai group.

In April 2015, Gumino arrested Gasosi and Nkunzigoma and detained them at their Kajembwe base. Both were reportedly tortured, and Nkunzigoma died as a result of his injuries, while Gasosi survived in critical condition. These events caused strong reactions within the Banyamulenge community, where many felt the Gumino had exceeded acceptable limits. The incident also took on clan dimensions, as Gasosi belonged to the Abagorora clan, Nkunzigoma to the Abatira, while Gumino leaders Nyamusharaba and Semahurungure were from the Abasita clan. Around the same period, fighting intensified between the Gumino and Mai-Mai groups composed of Fuliru and Nyindu fighters operating in eastern Bijombo, particularly around Mukumba, Kanono, and Chanzovu under the leadership of a young Nyindu commander named Baleke. The FARDC also became involved in some of these clashes, partly due to tensions with the Gumino over taxation at the Bijombo-Ishenge weekly market. Violence continued throughout 2015 and escalated in early 2016. In response, the FARDC commander of the South/South Kivu operational sector, General Gustave Bwange Safari, attempted negotiations with the Gumino, but these efforts failed, largely because the group insisted that decisions could not be taken in the absence of Tawimbi, who was still in Kinshasa. In February 2016, the FARDC launched a military operation in Bijombo, known as "Natawala Hapa", which did not significantly weaken the armed groups but instead contributed to further instability. During the operation, the FARDC targeted Gumino positions, forcing them to retreat into the Bijabo forest, an area previously used as a FRF stronghold. The army also relied on Mai-Mai groups as guides in the difficult terrain. At the same time, FARDC units were accused of committing abuses against civilians, particularly against Banyamulenge populations, including arbitrary arrests of young men suspected of collaborating with the Gumino. These actions, combined with intensified clashes following Gumino counterattacks, reinforced perceptions that the army was biased. Although some Banyamulenge had initially supported the FARDC intervention due to dissatisfaction with the Gumino, many later withdrew their support and began viewing the Gumino more favorably. This shift was also reinforced by the growing polarization of communities in Bijombo and the escalating dispute over control of local leadership positions.

=== 2018–2020: Intercommunal violence and restructuring under Makanika ===
By June 2018, tensions escalated into open violence between Twirwaneho and a coalition of Fuliru, Nyindu, and Bembe armed groups. During this period, Twirwaneho received reinforcements from a Rwandan armed group based in Bijabo, in the highlands of the Tanganyika sector of Fizi Territory, and established a base in Masango with support from a Burundian rebel faction. The conflict led to the destruction of homes, livestock losses, and the depopulation of several villages in northern Bijombo, Uvira Territory. According to a report by the United Nations Security Council, by 2019 Twirwaneho's composition had expanded to include former Gumino combatants and members of the Banyamulenge diaspora, some of whom were referred to as "Androids". (Note: Name given by the local population, as the majority of the diaspora arrived in the Hauts-Plateaux region using Android mobile telephones.) The group also benefited from financial and material support provided by transnational Banyamulenge networks. In response to the deteriorating security situation, FARDC's Sokola 2 command called on 11 February 2019 for the disarmament of all local and foreign armed groups operating in Uvira Territory and the surrounding highlands. While several groups signaled a willingness to disarm, including Maï-Maï leader Trésor Ebuela wa Seba, who presented himself in Mikenge, Mwenga Territory, with approximately 300 fighters, the region remained entangled in transnational conflict dynamics, as numerous Congolese factions were allied with foreign rebel groups, including RED-Tabara, Forces Nationales de Libération (FNL), and FOREBU, Burundian and Rwandan forces that FARDC warned to vacate Congolese territory or face military action. On 9 May, clashes broke out in the Balala-Nord groupement between a faction led by Ebuela and Banyamulenge militias, which was reportedly triggered by the killing of a Nyindu village chief by Banyamulenge fighters. In retaliation, Ebuela's forces carried out attacks on several villages, including Mikalati, Kanihura, Kamombo, Kabara, Oma, and Alumya, during which the local civil society organization Groupe des Voix des Sans Voix (GVSV) reported that at least 20 people were killed.

In early 2020, Twirwaneho was strengthened after the defection of Michel Rukunda, also known as Makanika, a former FARDC officer. Under his leadership, the group developed a more structured and centralized military organization, accompanied by expanded recruitment efforts among local and diaspora Banyamulenge. The United Nations Group of Experts reported that some of these recruitments were conducted forcibly. Twirwaneho also established logistical infrastructure, including a clandestine airstrip used for arms supply, which was later dismantled by FARDC, and maintained networks of armed civilian supporters in surrounding villages. On 4 June 2020, Twirwaneho forces attacked a FARDC position in Tuwetuwe, in Fizi Territory, resulting in the deaths of two militia members and injuries to three others, including a civilian. Although FARDC reported that it had repelled the assault, local confidence in the state's ability to provide sustained security remained limited, which led some families to seek refuge as far as Tanganyika. The highlands of Tanganyika subsequently became a center of renewed clashes involving Michel Rukunda. Although he denied any alliance with Gumino and Twirwaneho, all three groups expressed similar grievances against FARDC, particularly its perceived failure to prevent village burnings, killings, and livestock theft. While Makanika publicly called for peace and urged armed groups to disarm, his intentions were viewed with skepticism by rival factions such as the Maï-Maï Biloze Bishambuke, which accused the coalition of pursuing concealed strategic objectives. On 20 June, violence escalated further when a coalition of Gumino, Makanika, and Androïd forces launched a coordinated surprise attack on FARDC positions in Kamombo, located in Balala-Nord. The attack resulted in the deaths of two Congolese soldiers and forced the FARDC to withdraw toward Mikenge to avoid harming civilians in densely populated areas. That same day, other clashes were reported in Kalingi, north of Minembwe, and Kakenge, to the south, where Gumino engaged in combat with Maï-Maï factions; these confrontations resulted in three deaths in Kalingi and the death of a seven-year-old child in Kakenge.

=== Mid-2020–July 2023: human rights violations and offensives ===
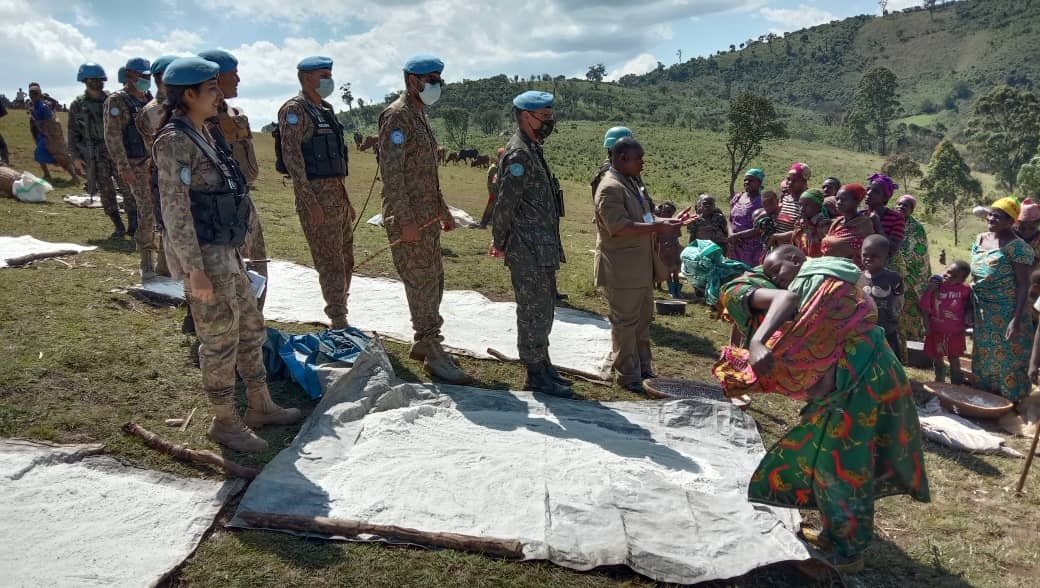
Displaced families seeking refuge in the Minembwe highlands in June 2020

From mid-2020 onward, Twirwaneho expanded its operations, engaging not only Maï-Maï militias and FARDC units but also affecting local civilian populations. Reports by the United Nations Security Council documented numerous human rights violations attributed to Twirwaneho fighters, including sexual violence, abductions, and assaults, primarily targeting women from the Bembe and Fuliru. Survivors reported incidents of gang rape by multiple armed assailants in locations such as Kamambo, Mikalati, Kitasha, and Marunde, often accompanied by ethnic slurs and threats intended to force communities to flee, while additional testimonies suggested at least 12 similar cases, alongside allegations of abductions, killings, and sexual abuse of internally displaced persons from Mikenge and the Bijombo camp, with some accounts indicating the involvement of children aged over 16 in these acts. In September 2020, around ten people were killed after three days of fighting between militia factions across the high plateaus of Fizi Territory, Mwenga Territory, and Uvira Territory, where a coalition including Android, Al-Shabaab, Twirwaneho, and Gumino, led by Michel Rukunda, engaged forces at a Mai-Mai Mutetezi stronghold. Civil society sources in Minembwe reported that 18 fighters from the Makanika coalition were killed and 41 wounded, while the opposing faction seized large numbers of cattle, reportedly driving at least 800 head toward Lulenge and the Itombwe forest. In October 2020, Twirwaneho launched attacks on villages in Itombwe and Lulenge, including Tabunde, Kukwe, Kashasha, Ibumba, Abangya, and Ibulu, which were largely inhabited by Bembe and Fuliru. The attacks resulted in the burning of villages and at least 20 deaths, after which Maï-Maï groups from the Bembe, Fuliru, and Nyindu communities counterattacked and expelled Banyamulenge fighters from these areas. In response to Twirwaneho's growing strength, prominent Maï-Maï leaders such as William Yakutumba and Trésor Ebuela wa Seba began forming an informal coalition of armed groups toward the end of 2020, including factions such as the National Coalition of the People for the Sovereignty of Congo (CNPSC), the Forces des Patriotes pour la Défense du Congo–Mouvement de Libération (FPDC-ML), and the Forces Armées "Biloze Bishambuke" (FABB). Although they lacked centralized command, the alliance facilitated greater operational coordination, joint offensives, and mutual reinforcement. During this period, Twirwaneho and Maï-Maï militias sustained their operations through continued attacks on FARDC positions and support from sympathetic communities, while the United Nations Group of Experts reported that at least 46 FARDC personnel, particularly from the 12th Rapid Reaction Brigade stationed in the Hauts-Plateaux, were arrested on charges related to arms trafficking.

Twirwaneho strengthened its position after other defections of senior FARDC officers, notably Colonel Charles Sematama in February 2021, while also reportedly coercing Banyamulenge civilians to provide recruits under threat of violence. In December 2021, Gumino fighters and allied groups launched coordinated attacks on FARDC positions in Kamombo, Namara, and Tchakira in Balala-Nord, which eventually brought these areas under the control of forces loyal to Makanika. Between September 2021 and early 2022, at least three Banyamulenge leaders, including local authorities in Minembwe, were assassinated for resisting recruitment efforts or for their perceived support of rival factions, while the leader of an internally displaced persons camp in Mikenge was abducted in October 2021. By August 2022, public dissatisfaction with United Nations Organization Stabilization Mission in the Democratic Republic of the Congo (MONUSCO) had intensified and led to protests in Baraka, across Fizi Territory, and in Mboko, the administrative center of the Tanganyika sector. In response, FARDC initiated localized security operations; on 27 January 2023, elements of the 222nd battalion stationed in Mboko arrested three armed individuals in Chonwe village in the Basimukuma-Nord groupement. On 16 June 2023, Twirwaneho launched an assault on joint positions held by the East African Community Regional Force (EACRF), Burundi National Defence Force (FDNB), and FARDC in Nyamara village near Kamombo, which prompted both sides to reinforce their troop deployments.

=== August 2023–present: Alignment with M23 and renewed offensives ===
By August 2023, reports indicated that the Rwandan-backed March 23 Movement (M23) had established contacts with Twirwaneho in the highlands of Minembwe, as noted in a report by António Guterres, which raised concerns that renewed hostilities in North Kivu could open a second front in South Kivu and mobilize previously inactive armed groups. On the night of 1–2 October, Twirwaneho attacked the headquarters of the 121st Parachute Battalion, and on 3 September, its fighters assassinated a soldier at the Union des Groupes d'Études et d'Actions pour le Développement de Fizi-Itombwe (UGEAFI), whose body was later recovered from the Lwiko River; and additional attacks attributed to forces under Colonel Charles Sematama targeted joint security posts with the Congolese National Police in Kakenge, which resulted in the deaths of two soldiers and the seizure of their weapons. On 12 September, twelve Twirwaneho members, including two minors serving as bodyguards, surrendered to FARDC's 12th Rapid Reaction Brigade in Minembwe and were thereafter transferred to MONUSCO and military authorities in Bukavu. In December 2023, clashes erupted between FARDC's 12th Rapid Reaction Brigade and a coalition of Mai-Mai Yakutumba, Mai-Mai-Biloze Bishambuke, and RED-Tabara militias in several villages around Minembwe, particularly in Kivumu, Rutigita, Masha, Monyi, and Kabingo. Seven militiamen were killed, four were wounded.

In February 2025, Twirwaneho aligned with the M23 after the death of Rukunda in a government drone attack. On 10 March 2025, Twirwaneho-M23 forces advanced southward from Nyangezi and seized several areas, including Lwanguku the capital of the Kaziba Chiefdom. In April 2025, the group rebranded as the "Movement of Republicans for the Dignity of Peoples" (MRDP). In August 2025, M23 and Twirwaneho coordinated attacks around Uvira and Mwenga Territory against Wazalendo and Mai-Mai militias, which violated the ongoing ceasefire.

== Sanctions ==
On 28 July 2023, Twirwaneho was sanctioned by the European Council for human rights violations and sustaining the armed conflict in the DRC. In July 2024, the United States also sanctioned its deputy leader, Charles Sematama, over similar allegations.
