= Minembwe =

Village in South Kivu, Democratic Republic of the Congo

Coordinates: 3°56′3.91″S 28°43′48.22″E

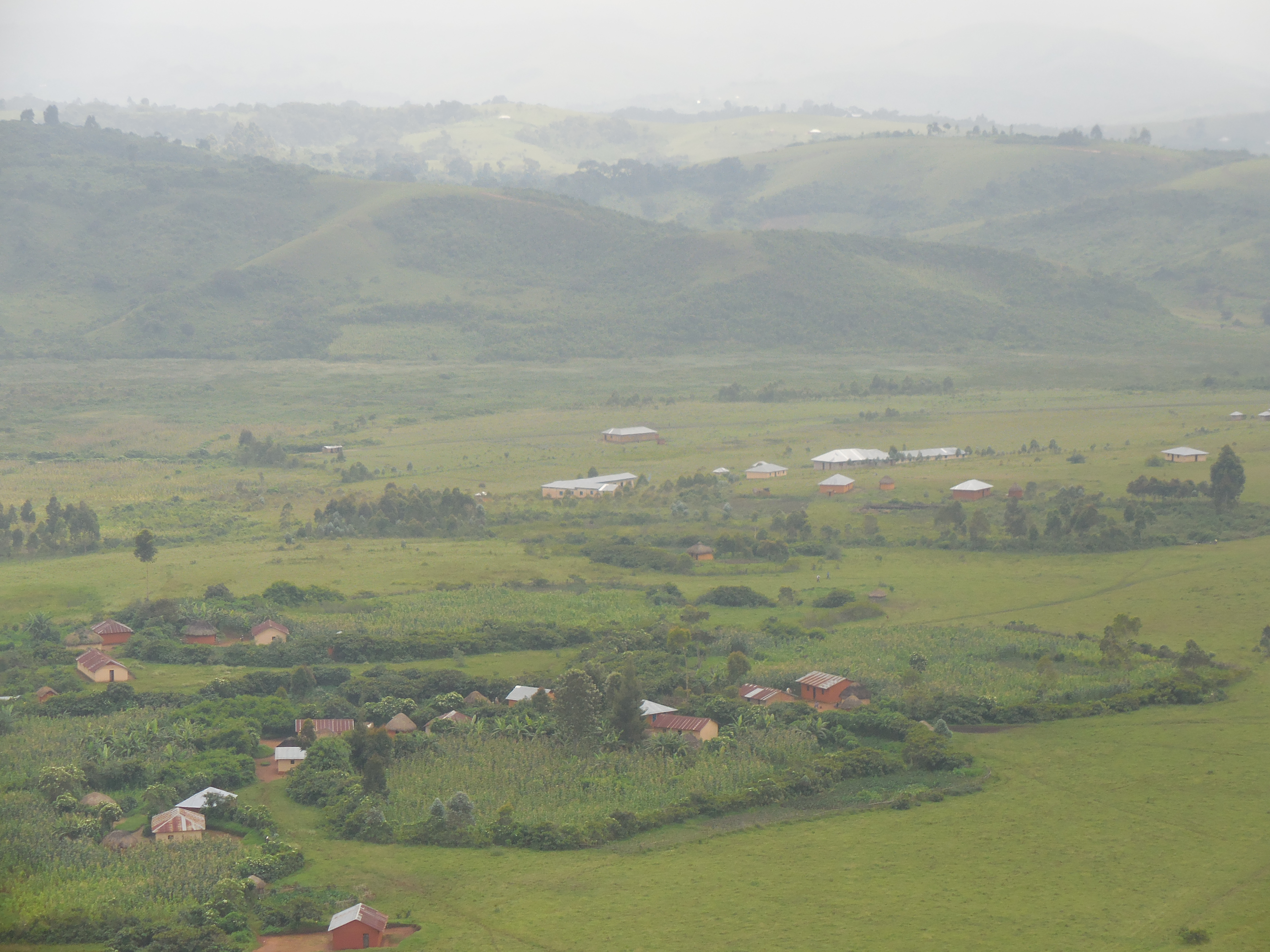
- Aerial view of Eben-Ezer University of Minembwe

- Location within Democratic Republic of the Congo
- Country: DR Congo
- Province: South Kivu
- Territory: Fizi
- Sector: Lulenge
- Grouping: Basimunyaka-Sud
- Time zone: UTC+2 (CAT)

Minembwe is a village located in the highlands of Lulenge, within the Fizi Territory of the South Kivu province in the Democratic Republic of the Congo. It is situated at an altitude of about 2,500 meters above sea level, in a hilly and mountainous region covered with forests, which provides fertile land for agriculture. It lies approximately 150 kilometers southward of Bukavu. The region is interspersed with myriad streams and rivers that flow towards Lake Tanganyika, the second-deepest lake in the world.

Historically, Minembwe was predominantly settled by the Bembe and Buyu peoples; however, the region is renowned for its profound ethnocultural diversity, serving as a home for several other Bantu-speaking ethnic groups such as the Bafuliiru, Banyindu, Baholoholo, Babwari, Bavira, Balega, Banyanga, Bashu, Baamba, Banyamulenge, and Baswaga.

== History ==
=== Early history and ethnic tensions ===
Traditionally, the Bembe people predominantly inhabited Minembwe. According to Belgian geographer and social sciences professor George Weis of the Université libre de Bruxelles and lecturer at the University of Antwerp, his 1959 book Le pays d'Uvira: Étude de géographie régionale sur la bordure occidentale du lac Tanganika explains that "shortly before 1900", several Tutsi pastoral families fleeing Rwanda crossed the Ruzizi River into the Belgian Congo and first settled in Lemera within Bafuliiru Chiefdom. Their descendants later moved into Bavira Chiefdom and established villages such as Galye, Munanira, Kishembwe, and Kalonge-Kataka, beyond the last Vira settlements. Weis dates the founding of Kishembwe to 1935, Masango to 1938, Bijombo to 1946, and Kianjovu to 1947, while Galye was founded sometime after 1900. Although Rwandans formed the majority, the villages were described as having a mixed and "international" character because the Fuliru and Nyindu were also present in large numbers. In contrast, Vira presence was very limited, since these settlements were located farther from Vira lands on the lakeside slope and separated by the "muhulu" ridge, making them closer to other plateau valleys inhabited by Fuliru from Bafuliiru Chiefdom, Nyindu from Mwenga Territory, and Bembe from Fizi Territory. Weis notes that only about 32 people from Bavira Chiefdom, including just one Vira, were among 764 Congolese living in the three plateau villages. He also explains that the arrival of the Rwandan groups did not lead to conflict with the Vira because they settled outside Vira-controlled areas. From the beginning, these Rwandan groups focused their pastoral activities on the plateau, away from Vira farming areas. They spread out with their large cattle herds, estimated at around 11,000 animals, and some groups even moved as far as the Luemba region, about sixty kilometers southwest of Uvira, in areas outside the Bavira Chiefdom but still within unoccupied land. At first, there were only minor uncertainties about where to establish villages. For example, the Kirungu ridge initially attracted the Rwandan chief Budulege, who settled there, but he later left in 1935 and agreed with the Vira to move and permanently establish Kishembwe in the Upper Kalimabenge area, closer to grazing land.

Weis observed that intermarriage between the Vira and these Tutsi pastoralists was uncommon, and technical exchange between them was also limited. However, their proximity did allow for regular contact, and in some ways their ways of life complemented each other. The Vira mainly provided food crops, while the Rwandans introduced a system of land use and spatial organization based on practices from their former homeland. These pastoralists arrived before European colonial rule, and the colonial administration viewed them with more suspicion than the Vira, as they were seen as only loosely settled, resistant to taxation and population counts, accused of damaging high-altitude forests, and suspected of trying to dominate local populations while avoiding European control. Because of this, they faced strong discrimination. After they had already settled on the lakeside slopes, the administration tried from 1930 onward to stop them from moving onto the plateau. In 1935, Fizi Territory was created, bringing the Bembe and Buyu into the new administrative unit, which was later divided into five sectors: Itombwe, Lulenge, Mutambala, Ngandja, and Tanganyika. After independence, Itombwe was later attached to Mwenga Territory to improve local control. Weis also noted that Mwenga Territory, Fizi Territory, and Uvira Territory often rejected these pastoralists and pushed them back when they attempted to settle permanently. It was only in 1950 that they were allowed, along with other mixed groups, to establish the permanent villages in Bijombo and Musondja, such as Bijombo, Kianjovu, and Masango-Tutanga, whose population at the end of 1954 was 3,548 people (764 men, 854 women, 1,930 children). Even then, the colonial administration continued to monitor them, grouping them separately, and later, in 1953, it changed its approach by dividing their villages among different Vira administrative groupings (groupements). By 1954, the authorities even considered reversing this policy and allowing more local political roles for them, such as appointing some as village or grouping chiefs. In places like Galye, even when Rwandan, Fuliru, and Vira hamlets were placed under the same chief, each group still used land in different ways. Similar situations appeared in many nearby high-altitude villages. For example, in Kitu, a Vira village at 1,700 meters on the Kambekulu shelf, a Rwandan hamlet existed higher up above 2,000 meters on Mount Mugula's eastern slope. Kirungu also showed this pattern, where Vira and Rwandan hamlets lived close together but used land differently: the Vira farmed the valley below, while the Rwandans grazed cattle on the surrounding degraded savanna.

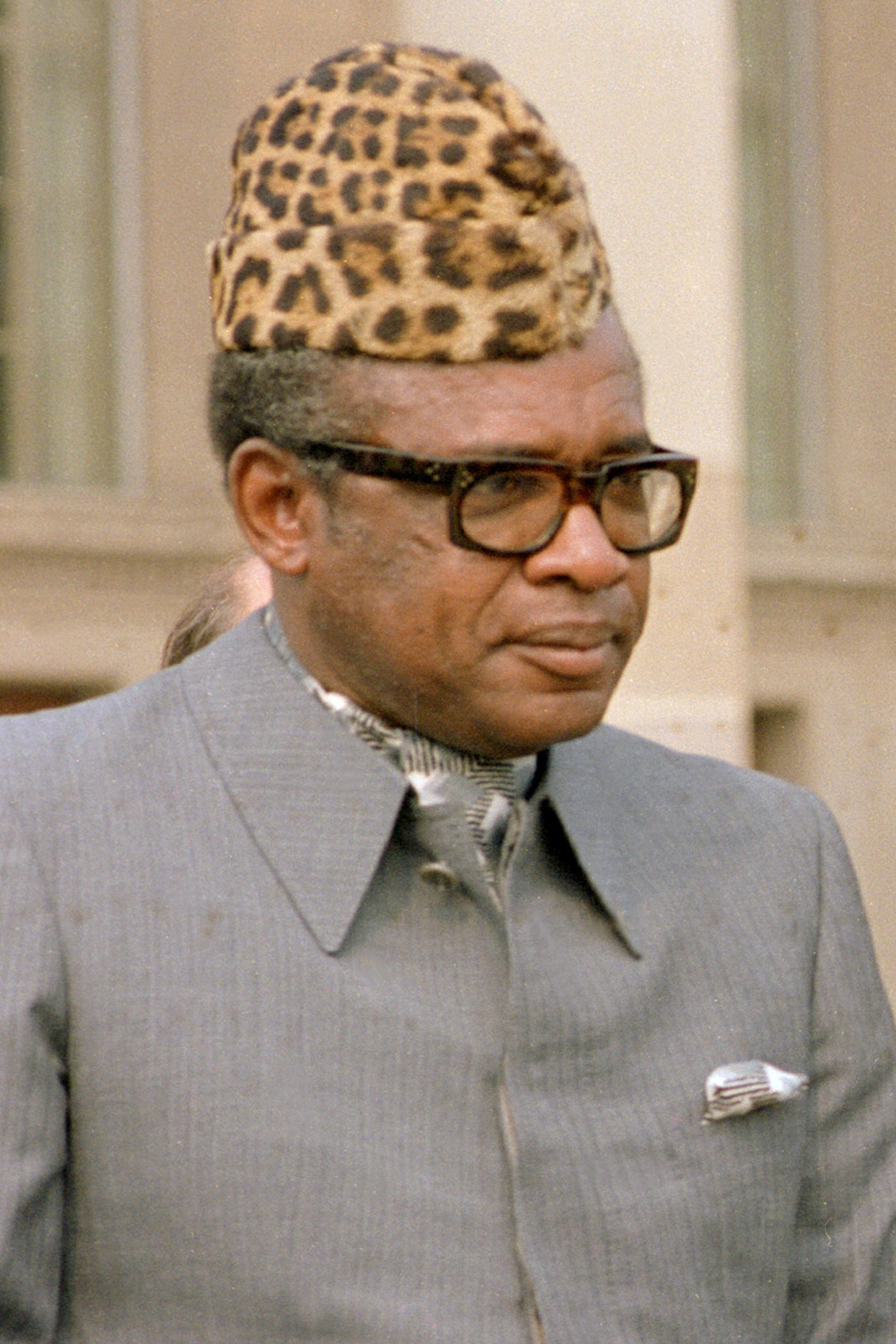
Mobutu Sese Seko sporting a typical abacost in 1983

During the Rwandan Revolution of 1959–1961, the UN High Commissioner for Refugees (UNHCR) also resettled Rwandan refugees in places such as Lemera, Mulenge, and Katobo in Uvira Territory, as well as Kalonge in Kalehe Territory, but many of these refugees later spread across Lulenge and settled in remote areas. The term Banya-Mulenge, which later came to refer to these Tutsi pastoralists, was first used in academic writing by Jacques Depelchin in his doctoral dissertation written after the conflicts of the 1970s. This term does not appear in colonial administrative documents. Historically, these groups were mainly described as Banyarwanda. In the works of scholars such as Weis, Gaspard Kajiga, and even Depelchin, the populations were referred to as Rwandans, Tutsi, or Wanya-Ruanda, rather than Banya-Mulenge. Depelchin only used the term Banya-Mulenge once, as a nickname for Rwandan Tutsi refugees settled in Mulenge, a village in Bafuliiru Chiefdom. In his 1974 doctoral thesis, written fourteen years after Congo's independence, he consistently referred to them as Rwandans or Tutsi, not Banyamulenge. The earliest documented use of "Mulenge" in relation to Tutsi refugees in Kivu appears in the 1964 UNHCR report, on page 16, paragraph 156. It was only in the early 1970s, under Mobutu Sese Seko, that these groups were no longer consistently classified as immigrants from Rwanda.

=== 1972 Ordinance, land acquisitions and conflicts ===
In 1972, Barthélémy Bisengimana Rwema, a Tutsi cabinet director under Mobutu during his second republic, promulgated a presidential "Ordinance № 69-096", which collectively granted Zairean nationality to all Banyarwanda. In the same year, Banyarwanda changed their eponym from "Banyarwanda" to "Banyamulenge" to distinguish themselves from recent immigrants from Rwanda. However, this legislation equated both long-settled Banyarwanda populations entitled to Zairean citizenship and recent immigrants, which caused bewilderment among the affected communities. The recognition of Congolese nationality, combined with land reforms introduced during the Zairianisation period, allowed influential Tutsi individuals to obtain land, including former colonial plantations redistributed by the state. These measures legalized many Tutsi settlements in the Kivu region and gave them official recognition. However, the ordinance proved difficult to implement because many communities believed the beneficiaries did not meet the required conditions for nationality. This increased ethnic tensions, as other Congolese groups felt that Tutsi communities were taking control of land and resources. Concern over growing divisions and threats to national unity led the government to repeal the 1972 ordinance through Law No. 81/002 of 29 June 1981, which revised nationality regulations and the recognition of ethnic communities. Despite this change, tensions between the Banyamulenge and other Congolese groups remained strong, and civil registry offices were often burned in attempts to destroy records related to nationality and land ownership.

Between 1991 and 1993, these tensions became more violent during disputes over Kivu's representation at the National Sovereign Conference (Conférence Nationale Souveraine) in Kinshasa, which had been organized to introduce democratic reforms in Zaire. During this period, youth militias carried out attacks and killings in Kivu before the Special Presidential Division intervened to restore order. At the beginning of the First Congo War, the Banyamulenge joined Rwandan Tutsi refugees living across Kivu in opposition to nationality and land laws viewed as discriminatory. They allied themselves first with the Rwandan Patriotic Front (RPF) and Alliance of Democratic Forces for the Liberation of Congo (ADFL), and later with the Rwanda-backed Rally for Congolese Democracy (RCD) during the Second Congo War. During these conflicts, Banyamulenge forces were accused of attacking refugee camps and heavily populated villages and of carrying out killings of civilians in Bwegera, Luberizi, Luvungi, Katala, Rubenga, Lubarika, Kakumbukumbu, Mutarule, Kagunga, Kiliba, Ndunda, Biriba, Sange, Rwenena, Kahororo, Kamanyola, Lemera, Kidote, Makobola, Kasika, Kilungutwe, and Katogota. After Mobutu was overthrown, the RCD movement, led by Azarias Ruberwa, declared Minembwe an autonomous Tutsi territory in 1999, together with Bunyakiri in Kalehe Territory.

== Post-Congo Wars (2000s–present) ==
=== Creation of Minembwe Territory ===
The dispute over the establishment of Minembwe Territory cannot be separated from the issue of the Bijombo groupement in Uvira Territory, even though the conflict became more prominent during the late 1990s. The Minembwe Territory was established during the Second Congo War. At the center of the conflict was the question of territory, even though different groups expressed their claims in different ways. Abel Mukunde Sabuni of the Institut Supérieur de Développement Rural de Bukavu (ISDR-Bukavu) explains that alliances among Banyamulenge intellectual, military, and political elites were particularly strong, while similar alliances also existed among opposing ethnic groups, though in a more divided form because of fears of retaliation. On 23 July 1999 in Bukavu, fifteen Banyamulenge representatives drafted and signed a document asking the RCD administration to create a territory in the highlands. Their proposal sought the establishment of a territory intended for the Banyamulenge population and included the villages (localités) of Kamomba, Kabara, Tulambo, Kahololo, Rurambo, Katanga, Bijambo, Milimbo, Minembwe, Bijojwe, and Chanzovu. The signatories justified their request by referring to the existence of traditional Banyamulenge structures before colonization, colonial discrimination, lack of respect for ethnic cultural identities, poor management of ethnic issues during the Mobutu era, socio-economic underdevelopment, and insufficient political and administrative representation. The final section of the document called for the restoration of Banyamulenge rights, especially concerning territory, land ownership, cultural identity, and development. Even though the proposal was comprehensive, the RCD authorities did not fully adopt its recommendations. The decree issued on 9 September 1999, which provisionally established Minembwe Territory, did not explain why the proposed name "Territory of the Highlands" (territoire des hauts-plateaux) was rejected, with Minembwe instead chosen as the administrative center, nor why the Milimba collectivity (collectivité de Milimba) was replaced by Kamoto.

The proposal brought together representatives from several localités. The signatories included Muhamiriza Ntayoberwa from Kamombo, Dugu wa Mulenge from Kabara, Rwatangabo Eraste and Muhire Meshake from Tulambo, Gatimbirizo from Kahololo, Enoch Ruberangabo Sebineza from Rurambo, Matthieu Munyakazi and Jean Nyakagabo from Katanga Bijombo, Kamazi Mahasha and Serugaba Karaha from Mulimba, Tharcisse Kayira and Jackson Sebikabu from Minembwe, Kizehe Karojo from Bijombo, Makindi Bitana from Bijojwe, and Siméon Mushonda from "Canzovu". The proposal was described as having national importance because it sought to reorganize political authority over a larger area, reduce the influence of customary structures, and secure control over economic networks. From 1997 onward, the question of territory became increasingly central in Banyamulenge political claims. In an interview conducted on 11 April 2001, Mwamba Rugendusa, former adviser to Governor Jean-Charles Magabe, recalled that at a reconciliation meeting between ethnic groups in Uvira Territory, Dugu Wa Mulenge reacted strongly when Bembe representatives declared that they would fight to recover their territory. At another meeting in Bukavu attended by figures such as Gaëtan Kakudji, Faustin Munene, Charles Magabe, Benjamin Serukiza, Hadès Mutware, and Venant Gatimbirizon, participants argued that the Banyamulenge lacked representation because they did not have their own administrative territory, and for this reason, they requested one. During the meeting, Banyamulenge representatives presented Interior Minister Gaëtan Kakudji with a map proposing the division of Fizi Territory, Mwenga Territory, and Uvira Territory. They justified the proposal by pointing to their limited representation in state administration and the administrative difficulties caused by the large size of Fizi Territory, which they described as larger than Rwanda.

=== Dissolution of Minembwe Territory and the 2020 commune dispute ===
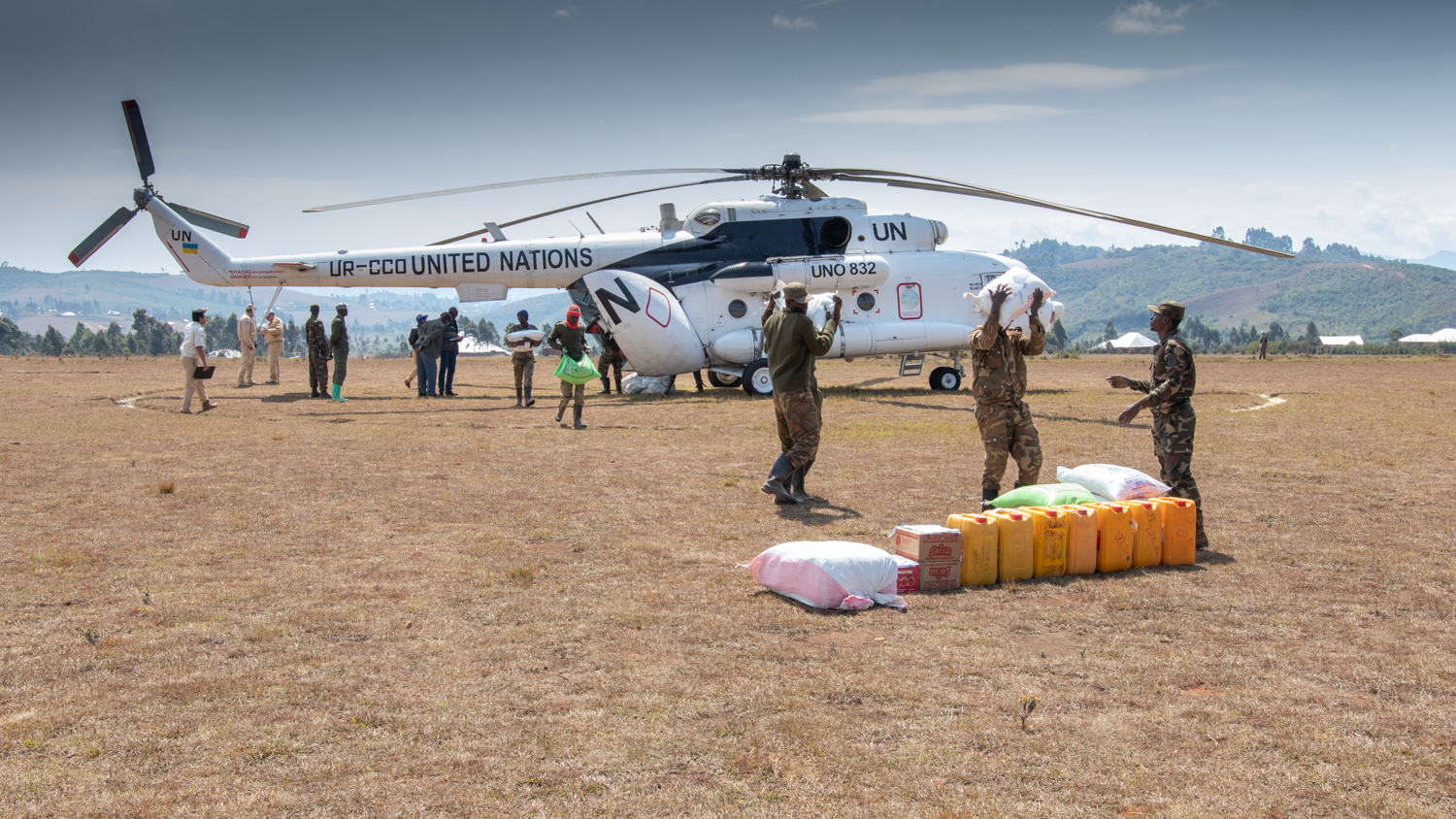
MONUSCO helicopter transporting rations to the 12th Brigade troops stationed in Minembwe

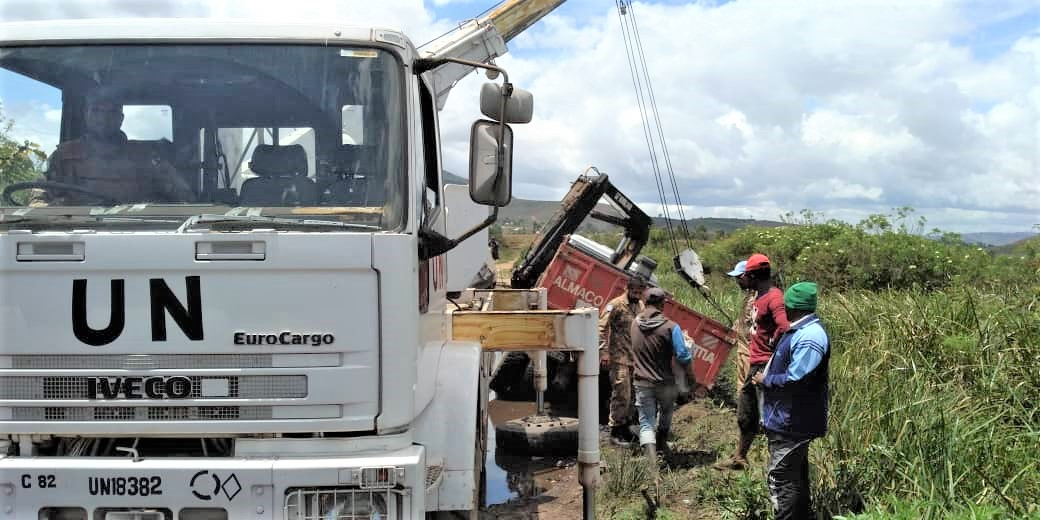
Members of MONUSCO's Pakistani Battalion assisting in the extraction of a truck stuck in marshland on a main road in Minembwe

The territorial entity was later dissolved following the 2002 Sun City Accords. However, tensions remained because territory continued to be closely connected to ethnic identity and political authority. This concern appeared again in a letter sent on 3 March 2004 to Azarias Ruberwa, in which Banyamulenge representatives reminded Ruberwa that his political leadership would remain incomplete unless Minembwe Territory was officially recognized.

In 2013, Decree No. 13-029 attempted to establish Minembwe as a commune, but the decree was never effectively enforced. Meanwhile, insecurity in the region continued to worsen, with clashes involving Burundian and Rwandan rebel groups, Mayi-Mayi militias, and Banyamulenge self-defense forces, often leading to civilian casualties and displacement. In September 2020, Ruberwa visited Minembwe to officially announce the commune's creation, which provoked strong national criticism, with many opponents considering the measure part of a broader Rwandan-supported expansionist policy. Critics also questioned the legality of the process, citing concerns about low population size, disputed boundaries, and irregular administrative procedures. The growing belief that the Banyamulenge represented Rwandan geopolitical interests, sometimes described as a "fifth column", increased fears of foreign influence and possible territorial annexation. Political figures often linked these fears to earlier secessionist crises, such as the Katanga conflict of the 1960s, which transformed the Minembwe issue into a national political crisis. In May 2019, more than 140,000 people were displaced due to armed skirmishes in Minembwe. The appointment of Gad Mukiza, a Tutsi, as mayor on 28 September 2020, sparked opposition from other Congolese ethnic groups who contended that proper legal and administrative procedures were bypassed. In response to these tensions, President Félix Tshisekedi revoked the 2013 decree on 8 October 2020 and established a neutral scientific committee to reassess the matter. In October 2020, the United Nations reported that at least 15 people had been killed and dozens others were injured in clashes between the Banyamulenge and other ethnic groups in the area.

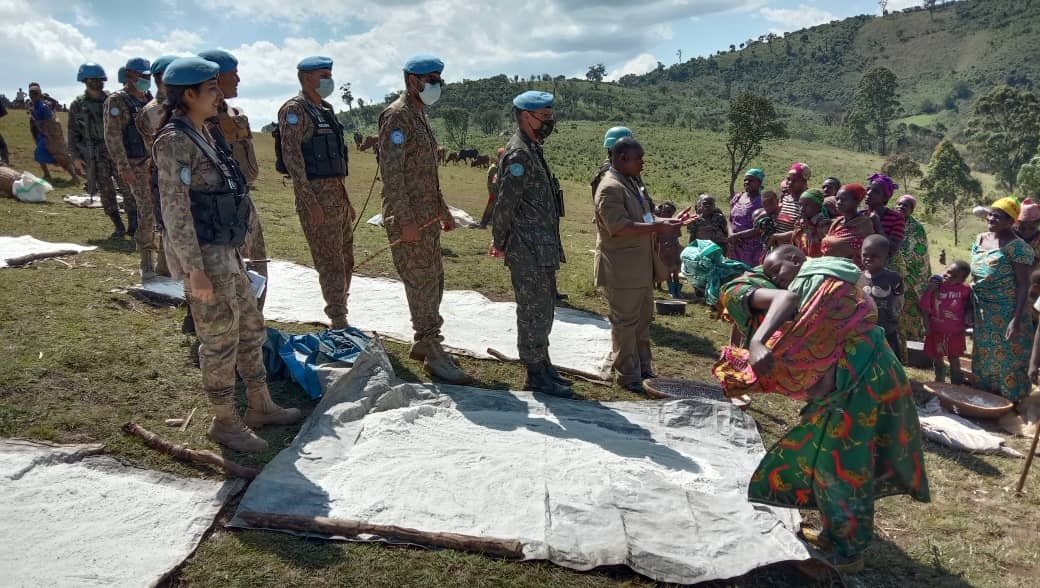
Displaced families seeking refuge in the Minembwe highlands

On 20 July 2021, Twirwaneho and allied Banyamulenge militias attacked Musika village in the southern Basimunyaka groupement of Lulenge. The attack resulted in the burning of fifteen houses and displaced civilians toward Runundu, Ilundu, Lumanya, and Kwamulima villages. Two elderly residents were burned to death inside their residence, numerous children were separated from their parents, and around one hundred cattle were looted. In May 2022, clashes between the Banyamulenge rebel group Gumino and the Mai-Mai Biloze Bishambuke caused nearly five deaths in the villages of Irumba and Ngandura, situated roughly 15 kilometers from Minembwe. In July 2022, Twirwaneho fighters killed four civilians in Minembwe. In August of the same year, the group reportedly abducted dozens of civilians and police officers in the Minembwe highlands. On 4 January 2023, the FARDC Deputy Chief of Staff responsible for operations, Jerome Chico Tshitambwe, appealed to the inhabitants of Minembwe to separate themselves from armed groups and encouraged militias to surrender their weapons and participate in the PDDRC-S program.
