= Corneille Nangaa =

Congolese politician and rebel leader

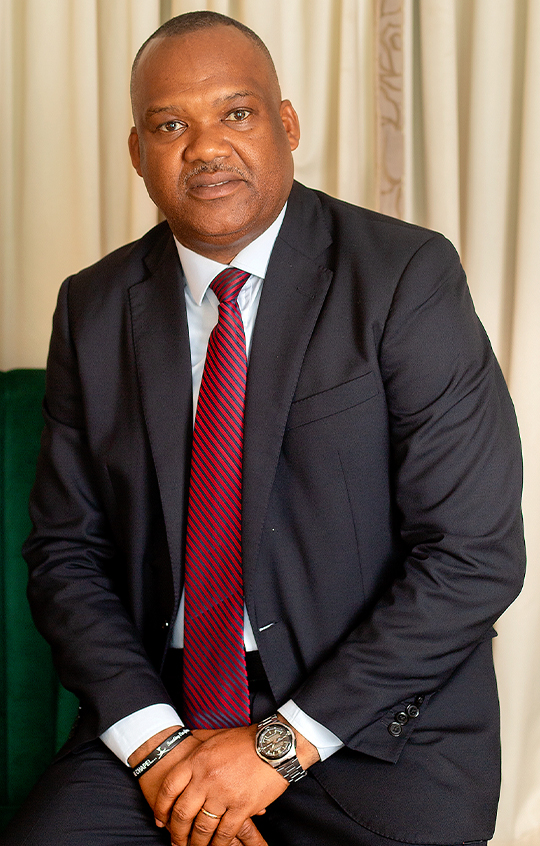
- Nangaa in 2023

Leader of the Congo River Alliance
- In office 15 December 2023 – 14 October 2026
- Preceded by: Office established
- Succeeded by: Office abolished

President of the Independent National Electoral Commission
- In office 2015–2021
- Preceded by: Apollinaire Malu Malu
- Succeeded by: Denis Kadima

Personal details
- Born: 9 July 1970 (age 56) Bagbele, Orientale Province, Democratic Republic of the Congo
- Education: University of Kinshasa

Military service
- Branch/service: March 23 Movement
- Battles/wars: Kivu conflict; M23 offensive; 2025 Bukavu offensive; 2025 Uvira offensive; 2025 Walikale offensive

Corneille Nangaa Yubeluo (born 9 July 1970) is a Congolese politician and rebel leader. Since 2023, he has been the head of the Congo River Alliance, a coalition of rebel groups in the eastern Democratic Republic of the Congo that includes the March 23 Movement (M23).

He was previously the director of the DRC's Independent National Electoral Commission from 2015 to 2021. In that role, he oversaw elections in the country and certified Felix Tshisekedi as the winner of the contested 2018 general election. He later had a dispute with Tshisekedi over what happened in 2018, and in 2023 announced his opposition to the Tshisekedi government. He started a coalition of rebel groups in North Kivu and the eastern DRC known as the Alliance Fleuve Congo (AFC), which includes the M23 movement.

== Early life and education ==
Nangaa was born on 9 July 1970, in Bagbele, Orientale Province (now Haut-Uele Province), Democratic Republic of the Congo, along the border with Sudan (now South Sudan).

He graduated from the University of Kinshasa with a degree in economics and worked as an Africa specialist at several international organizations, including the United Nations Development Programme.

== Political career ==
In 2015, he was appointed the president of the Independent National Electoral Commission (CENI) by then-president of the Democratic Republic of the Congo, Joseph Kabila. In this role, he oversaw elections in the DRC and declared Felix Tshisekedi as the winner of the contested December 2018 general election.

He was sanctioned by the United States Treasury Department for "undermining DRC elections" in March 2019, including for having delayed the general election for two years, since Kabila's constitutional mandated expired in 2016.

Nangaa was replaced as the president of CENI in 2021. He later claimed, several months before the 2023 election, that while being the head of the Electoral Commission he orchestrated Tshisekedi's victory in 2018 because of a deal made between Tshisekedi and outgoing president Kabila, which Tshisekedi denies. At the same time, in December 2023, he announced the creation of the Alliance Fleuve Congo (AFC), or Congo River Alliance, at a meeting of rebel groups at the Kenyan capital Nairobi. It consisted of 17 political parties, two political groups, and several armed militias, the latter including the March 23 Movement. M23 is considered the military wing of the AFC.

A military court in Kinshasa sentenced Nangaa to death in absentia for treason, insurrection, and war crimes. He was again ordered arrested by a military court for failing to prevent acts of torture under his authority during the M23 campaign (2022–present) in February 2025.
