= Claudel Andre Lubaya =

Congolese politician

Member of the National Assembly
- Constituency: Kananga

Personal details
- Born: 27 February 1968 (age 58)
- Party: Union Democratic African
- Occupation: Politician

Claudel Andre Lubaya Aucun is a Congolese politician and Union for the Congolese Nation Member of the National Assembly of the Democratic Republic of the Congo.

He is the son of politician André-Guillaume Lubaya.
