= Bagbele =

Village in the Haut-Uele Province, Democratic Republic of the Congo

- Village
- Location of the DR Congo – South Sudan border
- Coordinates: 4°20′N 29°16′E
- Country: Democratic Republic of the Congo
- Province: Haut-Uélé
- Territory: Dungu
- Chiefdom: Wando

Bagbele is a village in the Haut-Uélé province of the Democratic Republic of the Congo. It is in the Wando Chiefdom, part of the Dungu Territory. It is located on the border with South Sudan, and may have been a waypoint for arms smuggling across the border in the 2000s.
