= Congo River Alliance =

Congolese rebel coalition and rival government

- Alliance Fleuve Congo
- Other name: AFC
- Founder: Corneille Nangaa
- Founded: 15 December 2023
- Dates active: 2023-2026
- Dissolved: 14 October 2026
- Merged into: Front for the Refoundation of the Nation
- Country: Democratic Republic of the Congo
- Active regions: North Kivu; South Kivu
- Wars: Kivu conflict

The Congo River Alliance (French: Alliance Fleuve Congo; AFC) was a Congolese rebel coalition and rival government led by former Independent National Electoral Commission President Corneille Nangaa. The coalition consists of armed opposition groups and political parties that seek to overthrow the internationally recognised government of the Democratic Republic of the Congo. The coalition's principal member is the March 23 Movement (M23), a Rwandan-backed rebel group which has been the target of economic sanctions by the United States and United Nations. The AFC was regarded to be the political wing of the March 23 Movement. The AFC was absorbed into the newly formed Front for the Refoundation of the Nation in October 2026.

== Background ==
Corneille Nangaa, the future leader of the group, previously served as the director of the DRC's Independent National Electoral Commission from 2015 to 2021. In that role, he oversaw elections in the country and certified Félix Tshisekedi as the winner of the disputed 2018 presidential election, despite numerous reports that Tshisekedi's main rival, Martin Fayulu, had won.

In February 2023, he announced the formation of a new political party, the Action for the Dignity of Congo and its People (ADCP), with a platform focused on transforming the DRC into a "business land." He planned to run candidates at all levels for the upcoming 2023 general election, including running for the presidency himself. He later engaged in a public dispute with Tshisekedi over the alleged backroom deals linked to the 2018 vote, and in August 2023, exiled himself from the country, believing his security was no longer guaranteed there.

== History ==
=== Formation of the AFC ===
On 15 December 2023, a few days before the 2023 elections, Nangaa signed an agreement in Nairobi, Kenya with M23 and nine other armed groups, forming a new political-military alliance at achieving "national unity and stability" in the DRC. Nangaa criticized the inability of the government to maintain authority, promising to restore stability and create a more suitable economic environment. Nangaa also denounced the "plundering of public property" and "misappropriation of funds".

M23 called the new alliance a platform for peace, while the ruling party called it a "kind of a rebellion". The Kenyan government distanced itself from Nangaa's actions but rejected the DRC's request to arrest the opposition figures on the basis of freedom of speech. Nangaa later announced that his platform comprised 17 political parties, two political groupings, and several armed groups.

=== Sanctions, ties with Kabila, and alignment with the M23 ===
On 25 July 2024, the U.S. Department of the Treasury's Office of Foreign Assets Control (OFAC) imposed sanctions on the Congo River Alliance.

On 6 August 2024, President Félix Tshisekedi accused former President Joseph Kabila of backing the Congo River Alliance.

On 8 August 2024, a DRC military court tried and sentenced Nangaa in absentia to the death penalty for war crimes, participation in an insurrection, and treason.

On 30 November 2024, the group rejected a ceasefire that was mediated by Angola under the African Union's mandate, accusing the Kinshasa government of violating the truce.

On 25 January 2025, the group called on "all members of the Armed Forces of the Democratic Republic of Congo (FARDC) present in Goma and its surroundings to lay down their weapons within 48 hours". One of its members, M23, recently captured Sake, a strategic town 27 kilometres from Goma, suggesting that the group might move imminently to capture the city.

After two days of fighting, on 27 January 2025, M23 claimed to have captured Goma, the capital of North Kivu. In an interview before the offensive on the city, Nangaa said, "Our objective is neither Goma nor Bukavu but Kinshasa, the source of all the problems."

The group took control of Bukavu, the capital of South Kivu, on 16 February 2025.

On 9 March 2025, the Front Commun de la Résistance (FCR)—a coalition of the FPP-AP and Mapenzi's Nduma Défense du Congo-Rénové (NDC-R) formally aligned with M23, AFC units, and joined the Congo River Alliance.

On 19 March 2025, the M23 movement took control of Walikale, but claimed to have withdrawn from the area three days later.

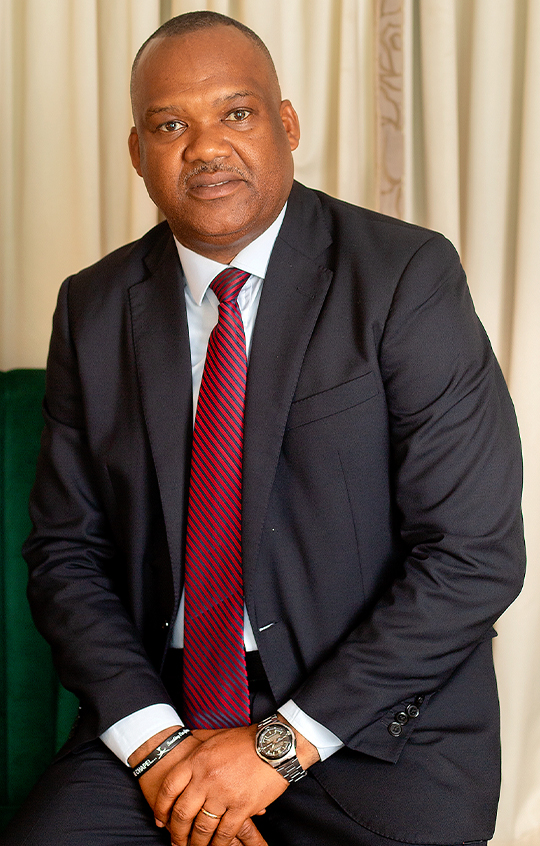
Corneille Nangaa in February 2023

=== Merger into the Front for the Refoundation of the Nation ===
On 12 October 2026, the AFC joined the Front for the Refoundation of the Nation (FRN), a rebel coalition led by former Congolese president Joseph Kabila. The AFC was formally dissolved on 14 October 2026, with its assets and privileges being assumed by the FRN.

== Members ==
Members of the Congo River Alliance include:

- March 23 Movement
- PARECO
- Kyahanda
- FPDC
- Movement of Republicans for the Dignity of Peoples–Twirwaneho
- Patriotic Resistance Front of Ituri
- Chini ya Kilima
- Zaïre-FPAC
- RED-Tabara
- National Forces of Liberation (FNL)
- Action for the Dignity of Congo and its People
- Nduma Defense of Congo-Renovated

== Rival administration ==
Congo River Alliance French: Alliance Fleuve Congo
- 2023–2026
- Emblem

- Territorial control of the AFC in April 2025
- Status: Unrecognized rival administration
- Capital: Goma
- Leader
  - 2023-2026: Corneille Nangaa
- Establishment: Kivu conflict
- History
  - Established: 15 December 2023
  - Dissolved: 14 October 2026

Area
  - Total: 34,000 km^{2} (13,000 sq mi)
Preceded by
Territory of the March 23 Movement (2022–2023)

The AFC controled around 34,000 square kilometers of territory in the North Kivu and South Kivu areas including the provincial capitals of Goma and Bukavu. Other towns controlled include Bunagana, Kiwanja, Kitchanga, Rubaya and Rutshuru, which the M23 already captured before the foundation of the Congo River Alliance. The AFC seeks to create an autonomous region in the DRC.

=== Provincial governors ===
The AFC had appointed the following as rival governors:

- North Kivu - Joseph Bahati Musanga (5 February 2025 – present)
- South Kivu - Emmanuel Birato (1 March 2025 – 4 June 2025), Patrick Busu Bwa Ngwi (?-present)

=== Judiciary ===
On August 12, AFC announced plans to create a judicial system in their territory. Bertrand Bisimwa, the civilian president and political leader of M23, and AFC leader Corneille Nangaa named 25 members to a commission that will set up courts and tribunals.

=== Economy ===
The Congo River Alliance advocated for tax cuts and for lower tariffs. However they began to charge a tax of 15% on the value of the coltan production and a four U.S. dollar per kilo levy on cassiterite. In July the M23 a group which is part of the Congo River Alliance had announced taxes like market stall taxes in their territories. Some months before the Democratic Republic of Congo central government imposed a entry taxes on M23 goods. When AFC seized Goma and Bukavu, banks shut down, according to the United Nations (UN) no banks operate in territory under AFC control.

=== Reaction ===
The United Nations Security Council through Resolution 2773 adopted in February 2025, called on M23 to stop all of its offensives and to reverse the creation of parallel state institutions.

== See also ==
- List of rebel groups that control territory
- Rival government
- New Zaire Government in Exile
