= Eben-Ezer University of Minembwe =

Private university in Minembwe, Democratic Republic of the Congo

- Université Eben-Ezer de Minembwe
- Motto: Vision, Science and Mission
- Type: Private
- Established: 2011; 15 years ago
- Affiliations: Christian
- President: Dr. Lazare R. Sebitereko
- Faculty: 17
- Undergraduates: 300
- Location: Minembwe, South Kivu, Democratic Republic of Congo; 3.9242°S 28.7090°E
- Campus: Rural
- Website: www.ueemi.org

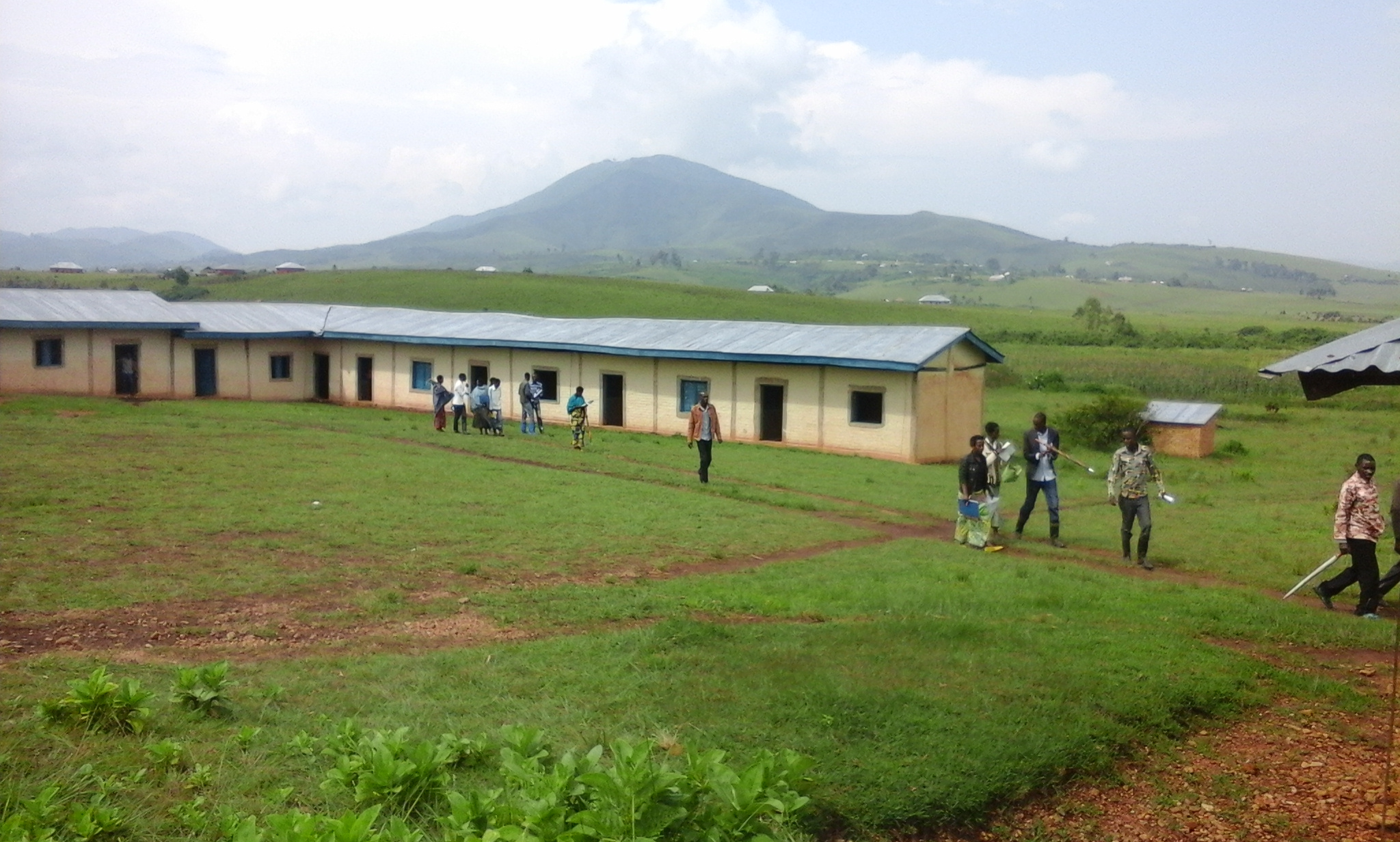
University students heading home at the end of the day at Eben-Ezer University of Minembwe

Eben-Ezer University of Minembwe was co-founded in 2011 and is led by Dr. Lazare R. Sebitereko. The university is the only university in the area and focuses on entrepreneurship, development and teaching skills. The universities main mission is sustainable community development and prioritizes in training the rural youth. The university has recently been partnering with Cornell University, who helps provide two courses at the college.

== Faculty ==
The university currently has 4 faculties:

- Theology
- Education sciences
- Health Sciences
- Agricultural and development sciences

== See also ==
- List of universities in the Democratic Republic of the Congo
- Education in the Democratic Republic of the Congo
