= MFP =

MFP may refer to:

== Politics ==
- Member of the Flemish Parliament

=== Political parties ===
- Marematlou Freedom Party, a political party in Lesotho
- Magyar Függetlenségi Párt or Hungarian Independence Party, a Hungarian political party after World War II
- Matabeleland Freedom Party, a separatist political party in Matabeleland, Zimbabwe
- Montenegrin Federalist Party, a political party representing Montenegrins in the Kingdom of Yugoslavia
- Move Forward Party, a center-left political party in Thailand

== Software and hardware ==
- Macromedia Flash Player, now known as Adobe Flash Player
- MyFitnessPal, a free app and website that tracks diet and exercise
- Multifunction printer, an office machine that incorporates the functionality of multiple devices in one

== Science, Medicine ==
- Membrane fusion protein, a protein which makes membranes combine
- Mean free path, in kinetic theory, a term describing the path of molecules, atoms or photons
- Sodium monofluorophosphate, an ingredient in toothpastes

== Art ==
- Mystery Flesh Pit National Park

=== Music ===
- Music for People (album), a 2000 album by the band VAST
- Music for Pleasure (record label), a record label from England

== Places ==
- Muzaffarpur Junction railway station (station code: MFP), a railway station in India
- Multifunction Polis, a proposed technology city in Australia

== Others ==
- Marinefährprahm, a World War II German landing craft
- Macassar Malay (ISO 639 code: mfp), a Malay trade language
- Main Force Patrol, an Australian Federal Police unit in the Mad Max movies
- Management Frame Protection, the name used by Cisco Systems to refer to IEEE 802.11w-2009
- Master Financial Professional, a designation offered by the American Academy of Financial Management
- Malay Film Productions, a defunct film studio in Singapore
- Mayors for Peace (MfP), an organisation promoting world peace
- Mechanical fuel pump, a common type of fuel pump
- Military Foot Police, a former corps of the British Army
- Minimum Foundation Program, the formula that determines the cost to educate students at public elementary and secondary schools in Louisiana
- Multifactor productivity, a measure of the change in output per unit of input in an economic system
- Music for People (organization), a non-profit organization dedicated to music-making and music improvisation as a means of self-expression
- Multifunction platform, a diesel generator for use in Africa
