= 2025 Uvira offensive =

M23 campaign in South Kivu, DR Congo

Uvira offensive
- Part of the M23 campaign
Date	February 16, 2025 – March 2025 (4 weeks); December 1, 2025 – December 10, 2025 (1 week and 2 days)
Location	South Kivu, Democratic Republic of the Congo
Result	M23 victory: M23 rebels capture Uvira; Displacement of 200,000 people; Rupture of 2025 Democratic Republic of the Congo-Rwanda peace agreement; Closure of Burundian border with DRC; M23 agrees to unilateral withdrawal
Territorial changes	M23 captures Uvira and several other towns

Belligerents
Congo River Alliance; March 23 Movement; Twirwaneho; RED-Tabara; Mai-Mai Rushaba (from March 2025); Rwanda (denied by Rwanda)	DR Congo; Burundi	(Democratic Republic of the Congo) Wazalendo

Commanders and leaders
Corneille Nangaa; Sultani Makenga; Emmanuel Birato Rwihimba (AFC-appointed Governor of South Kivu); Col. Rukunda Michel †	(Democratic Republic of the Congo) Félix Tshisekedi (Democratic Republic of the Congo) Jean-Jacques Purusi (Governor of South Kivu) (Democratic Republic of the Congo) Pacifique Masunzu (3rd Defense Region commander) (Democratic Republic of the Congo) Robert Yav Avul Ngola (33rd Military Region commander) (Burundi) Prime Niyongabo (FDNB chief of staff)	Unknown

Units involved
M23; RDF	FARDC; FDNB	Wazalendo militias

Strength
Unknown (Rwanda) 8,000 (alleged)	(Democratic Republic of the Congo) Unknown (Burundi) 18,000	Unknown
- At least 413 killed, 83 wounded, and 200,000 displaced (December 2025)

The 2025 Uvira offensive was a military operation conducted by March 23 Movement (M23) rebels in the eastern Democratic Republic of the Congo (DRC), centered around their advance toward Uvira located at the northern end of Lake Tanganyika. The military campaign followed the rebels' capture of Bukavu, the provincial capital of South Kivu, and occurred concurrently with advances towards Butembo in the neighboring North Kivu province.

The initial offensive slowed down in March and the front lines remained largely frozen until 1 December 2025. During a new offensive, M23 quickly advanced on Uvira along the Ruzizi River and National Road 5 as government defenses crumbled. M23 fighters entered the city, the provisional capital of South Kivu since the fall of Bukavu, on 9 December. Around 200,000 people were displaced by the renewed fighting in the region, including 20,000 that crossed the nearby border and reached Bujumbura, Burundi, on 9 December. M23 announced it was in full control of Uvira on 10 December.

== Background ==
Uvira, situated along Lake Tanganyika approximately 25 kilometers from Bujumbura, Burundi, serves as South Kivu's second-largest urban center. The city's strategic location near the Burundian border makes it a crucial point for regional security and refugee movements. Prior to the clashes, the city had received an influx of displaced officials and military personnel following the March 23 Movement (M23)'s capture of Bukavu. The withdrawal of leadership and security forces led to widespread disorder and armed confrontations with allied militia groups in Bukavu.

Burundi reported the arrival of approximately 10,000 refugees between 14–16 February 2025. These displaced persons were initially accommodated in temporary facilities within Burundi's Cibitoke and Bubanza provinces, pending relocation away from the border region in accordance with Burundian regulations. Burundian authorities implemented measures to distinguish between civilian refugees and military personnel among the arrivals.

== Offensive ==
=== Strategic withdrawal from Bukavu and FARDC–Wazalendo clashes ===
The Armed Forces of the Democratic Republic of the Congo (FARDC) strategically withdrew from Bukavu starting on 14 February 2025, aiming to establish defensive positions outside the city while minimizing civilian casualties. However, this plan faced opposition from allied militia groups, particularly the Wazalendo, who advocated for maintaining defensive positions within the city. The withdrawal precipitated violent confrontations between retreating FARDC forces and Wazalendo militia groups along the N5 highway south of Bukavu. Senior military sources reported widespread demoralization among troops following repeated operational failures and territorial losses. Attempts to establish defensive positions were further complicated by instances of soldiers abandoning their positions and engaging in looting during the strategic withdrawal.

From 15–17 February 2025, during the withdrawal and during M23 advances, armed confrontations erupted between FARDC forces and Wazalendo fighters, resulting in twelve fatalities among both military personnel and civilians. The conflict reportedly originated from the Wazalendo's attempt to acquire military equipment from FARDC soldiers who had retreated from Bukavu. When FARDC refused to relinquish their armaments, the situation escalated into armed violence.

Some sources claimed that on 17 February, FARDC senior officers in the region, including the 3rd Defense Region commander Lt. Gen. Pacifique Masunzu, 33rd Military Region commander Maj. Gen. Robert Yav Avul Ngola, and Sokola II operation commander in North and South Kivu, Brig. Gen. Andre Ehonza Uketi, left the Bukavu area and made their way to Uvira. The governor of South Kivu, Jean-Jacques Purusi, and his vice governor, were in Uvira when the fighting between FARDC and Wazalendo broke out, and crossed the border into Burundi. This created a disorganized command structure for the Congolese military in the days after the M23 capture of Bukavu.

These clashes, occurring in settlements including Kamanyola, Sange, and Uvira, emerged when Wazalendo fighters attempted to prevent FARDC personnel from retreating or deserting. The situation was exacerbated by incidents of military equipment being seized and redistributed by militia forces.

=== First M23 offensive and FARDC counterattack ===
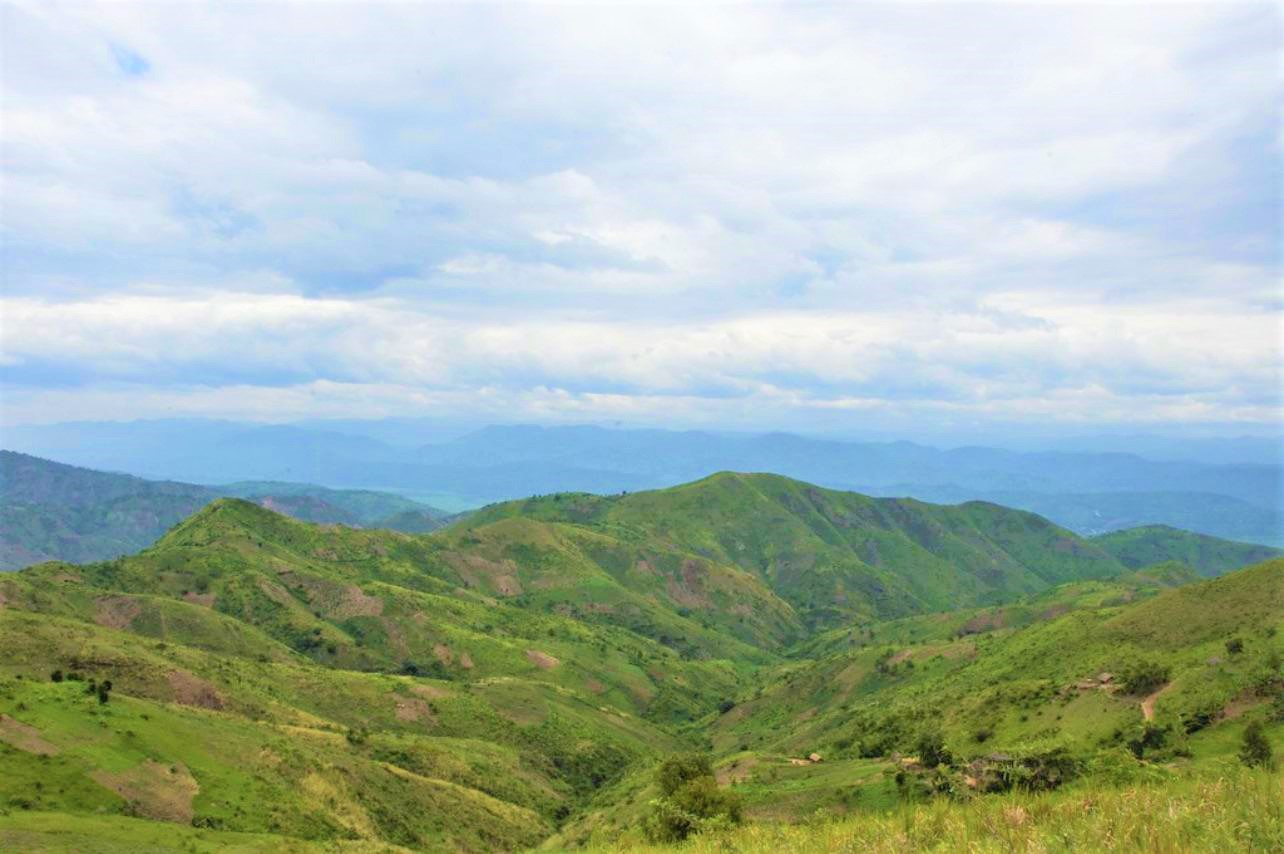
Kamanyola links Uvira in the south.

By 18 February, M23 forces secured Kamanyola, a strategic location situated 25 kilometers south of Bukavu, after overwhelming the disorganized FARDC defensive positions. The capture of Kamanyola established a launching point for potential further advancement toward Uvira, located 75 kilometers to the south. Social media documentation appeared to show some communities, particularly in the Panzi region south of Bukavu, welcoming advancing M23 forces.

On 19 February, Médecins Sans Frontières reported that combat occurred along stretches of the N5 highway from Bukavu to Uvira, leading to dozens of injuries. Many FARDC soldiers took control of boats so they could flee across Lake Tanganyika. Guns were fired while citizens tried to get onto the boats. A prison in Uvira was broken into, freeing 228 FARDC soldiers who had been detained for desertion.

During M23 forces' advances, Burundi initiated the withdrawal of its National Defence Force (FDNB) from the eastern Democratic Republic of the Congo, ending a long-term military presence in the region. Multiple military vehicles crossed back into Burundi from South Kivu, though some troops remained temporarily stationed near the border region.

The Minembwe village was captured by an M23-aligned rebel group, the Twirwaneho, on 21 February after defeating government troops, and also caused the Burundian National Defence Force troops in the village to withdraw. The leader of the Twirwaneho was killed on 19 February in a FARDC drone strike. According to the UN, Twirwaneho and the Burundian group RED-Tabara became "proxies" of M23 and the Congo River Alliance in South Kivu. On 24 February, the military governor of South Kivu arrived in Uvira with 600 FARDC soldiers and police officers, having left Bukavu when it fell to M23. On 25 February, the FARDC launched an attack on the Twirwaneho rebels in an effort to retake Minembwe and its airstrip. The military claimed to have killed four rebel commanders in a drone strike. On the same day, the M23-aligned group captured the town of Mikenge to the north. It was reported on 26 February that Burundian troops in the DRC were joined by reinforcements from Burundi and advanced north with Congolese government forces along the RN5 road, and were within six miles of the M23 positions around Luvungi.

As of 1 March, M23 and groups aligned with it were present in six of the eight territories of South Kivu. M23 is also supported in the province by Burundian fighters from the RED-Tabara group. Combat involving them and Congolese government forces, the Wazalendo militias and the FARDC, was reported in the Walungu Territory and the Mwenga Territory. In the latter, fighting continued outside of Mikenge town. On 3 March, the South Kivu provincial government was officially reestablished in Uvira by vice-governor Jean-Jacques Elakano. The governor, Purusi, had gone to Kinshasa, where he was received by President Félix Tshisekedi. On that same day pro-Congolese government militias began an advance in Mikenge, which was held by Twirwaneho and RED-Tabara rebels, and they captured it on 5 March. On 10 March, the FARDC and its allied militias launched ground and air attacks, including with aircraft from the Congolese Air Force, against M23 positions around Minembwe.

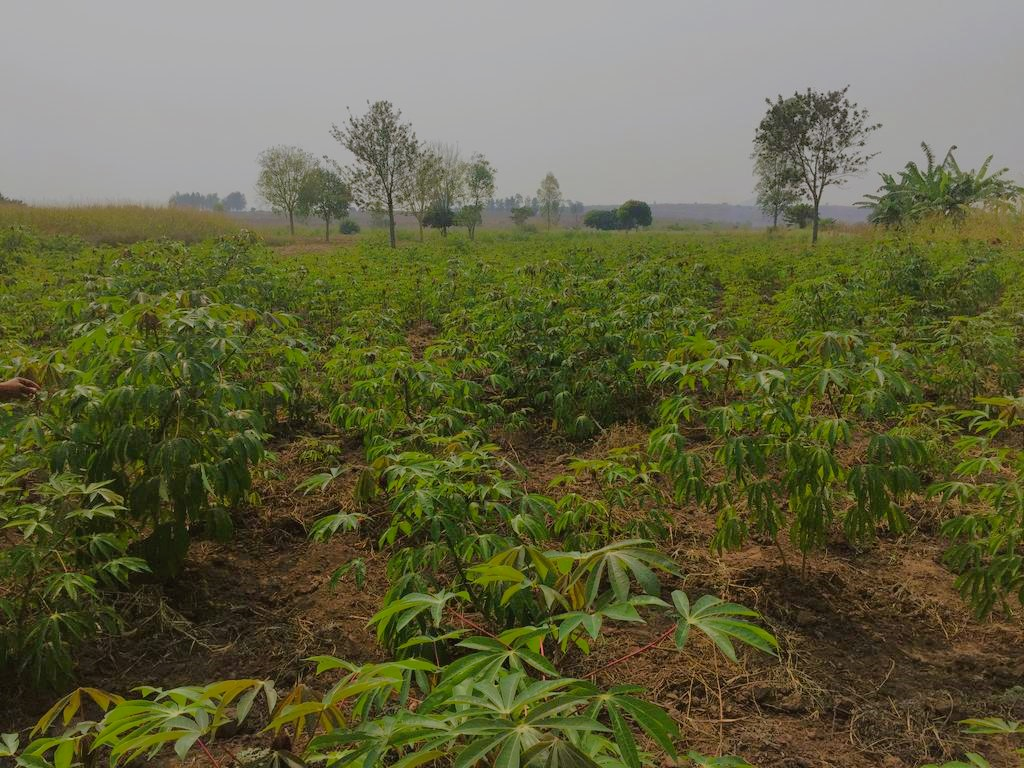
Katogota, approximately 60 km south of Bukavu, is situated near the villages of Kamonyi and Rusagara, close to the Rwanda and Burundi border regions.

On 12 March, M23 captured at least six villages in the Walungu Territory and the Uvira Territory after advancing about 25 miles (40 km) south towards Uvira. The group's movement was to the west of National Route 5, where the FARDC and Burundian FDNB troops have taken positions. This brings M23 forces to about 20 miles (32 km) away from Uvira. The captured villages included Rurambo and Kigarama in the Bafuliiru Chiefdom, where a Mai-Mai Wazalendo militia group, Mai-Mai Rushaba, switched sides from the government to M23. There were reports of fighting between them and pro-government Wazalendo. In April 2025, Twirwaneho reinforcements were reported in Kamanyola, Katogota, Nyangezi, Luhwindja, and Kaziba, including convoys crossing the Rwanda–DRC border, which allowed M23 and the Rwandan Defence Force (RDF) to consolidate control over key transit routes, particularly Kaziba, Katogota, and the Tubimbi–Luhwinja corridor, and to expand operations from the Ruzizi Plain into the High Plateaus. Other advances in September–October toward Walungu Territory and Shabunda Territory, culminating in the capture of Nzibira, Luntukulu, Chulwe, Lubimbe, and positions along RP503, suggested an effort to secure logistical nodes linking Walungu Territory, Shabunda Territory, and Mwenga Territory, as well as airstrips and mineral trading centers. During this period, M23 and the RDF also sustained besieged enclaves held by MRDP-Twirwaneho in the High Plateaus by deploying additional troops despite pressure from FARDC, FDNB, and Wazalendo forces. After M23 reinforcements arrived in Minembwe in March 2025 under Lieutenant Colonel Jaffet Gakufe, a subsequent contingent led by Lieutenant Colonel Oscar Ndabagaza faced resistance while crossing hostile areas and reached Mikenge in late August.

=== Expansion into mineral-rich areas ===
On 21 September, M23 seized Nzibira, a strategic mineral trading hub in Walungu Territory and a transit point for cassiterite and coltan from Shabunda Territory, including production from mining areas around Nzovu. As a result of this expansion, territories under M23 control accounted for approximately half of South Kivu's cassiterite and coltan output and more than two-thirds of its wolframite production. While most artisanal and semi-mechanized gold mining in South Kivu remained concentrated in FARDC- and Wazalendo-controlled areas of Shabunda Territory, Mwenga Territory, and Fizi Territory, United Nations experts reported that M23-held zones included three major gold operations: a large artisanal site at Luhihi in Kabare Territory, the Twangiza mine in Mwenga Territory, and a semi-mechanized operation near Karhembo in Walungu Territory. Mining at Luhihi expanded rapidly following the January 2025 discovery of rich deposits at the Lomera site, with satellite imagery confirming the growth of a new mining settlement and the development of hundreds of active shafts; more than 5,000 artisanal miners were reportedly active during the first half of 2025. After assuming control in mid-February, M23 established de facto authority over local mining, replacing state services with an M23-run "mining office", imposing a production tax equivalent to 30 percent of the mineral's sale price, and introducing monitoring systems to assess ore quality and regulate transport to processing facilities, alongside additional levies on mining activities. On 30 August, M23 suspended operations at Lomera amid tensions with the mining community linked to rapid, unregulated expansion and rent-seeking practices, stating that activities would resume following the registration of artisanal miners; subsequent delays fueled speculation about a potential shift toward semi-mechanized exploitation.

=== Second M23 offensive and capture of Uvira ===
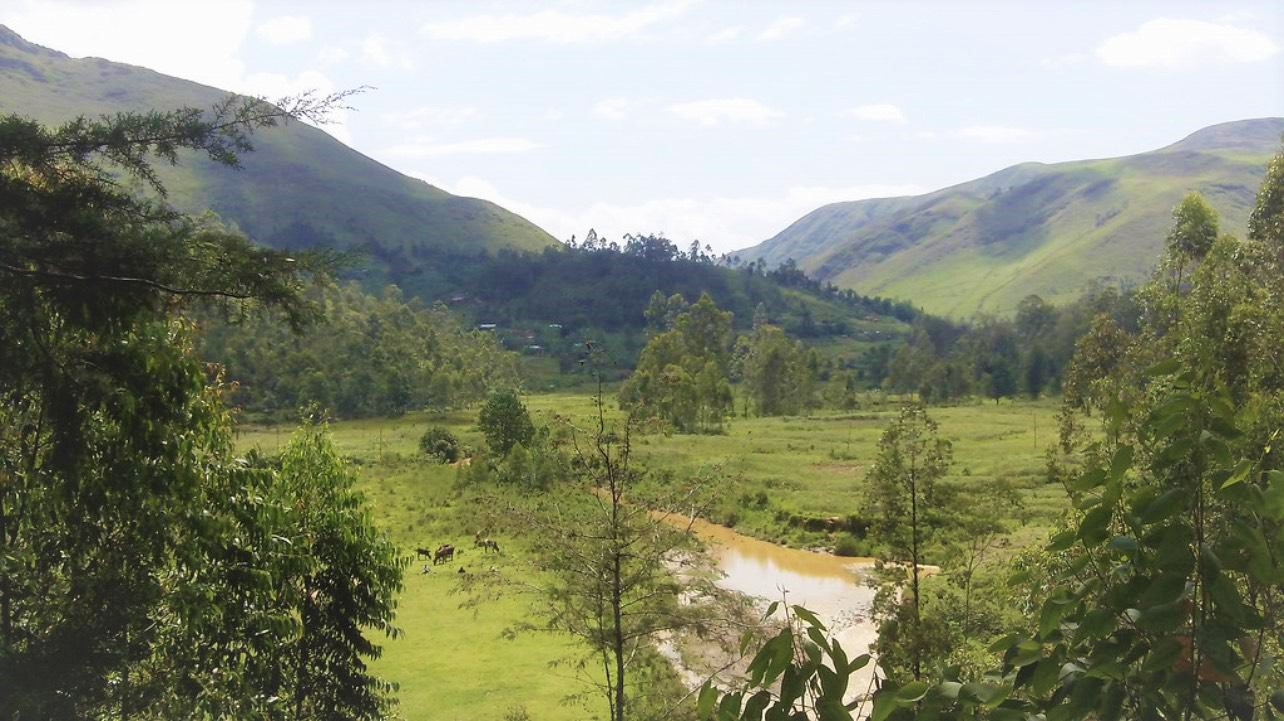
Kaziba Chiefdom was among the areas of Walungu Territory and Uvira Territory affected by M23 attacks on 1 December.

On 1 December, M23 launched an offensive on FARDC, Wazalendo, and Burundian FDNB positions along National Road 5 and near the Ruzizi River, which separates Burundi and the DRC, targeting Katogota, Lubarika, and Kaziba, in the Walungu and Uvira territories. The attack was launched from the group's forward position at Kamanyola, where it had remained since the front line mostly froze in March. M23 prepared for the offensive by gathering hundreds of troops and military equipment near the front. Burundi's foreign minister alleged that Rwandan soldiers entered the DRC as early as 28 November to reinforce M23 positions and take part in the offensive. Thousands of civilians fled the area along RN5 while clashes went on between M23 and government forces. Artillery strikes were fired, and the FARDC also used drones and fighter jets. Burundi blamed M23 for several projectiles that landed on its side of the border on 5 December. Fighting reached Luvungi, a key forward base for the Congolese military on 4 December, and it was taken by M23 between 5–7 December. Government troops retreated south from there to Luberizi. Burundian troops began withdrawing from their positions in the Ruzizi Plain after reportedly taking significant casualties, including their commander in the DRC being killed by an M23 drone strike. M23 also claimed to have captured several Burundian soldiers. Infighting among FARDC soldiers and Wazalendo militia members reportedly occurred on 7–8 December.

As government defenses collapsed, M23 captured Luberizi and several other villages along RN5 while advancing towards the town of Sange. On 8 December, M23 captured Sange from FARDC, Wazalendo, and Burundian troops, placing the group only 25 kilometers from Uvira. The chief of staff of the FDNB, General Prime Niyongabo, ordered remaining Burundian forces back into their country to defend its border. During the offensive up to this point, M23 had taken control of the towns of Katogota, Luvungi, Lubarika, Mitimbili, Bwegera, and Mutarule. Congolese and Burundian soldiers were reportedly fleeing "en masse" from Uvira on 8 December. The UN Group of Experts on the DRC noted that M23's military campaigns, alongside its parallel administrative structures, reflect a deliberate effort to create autonomous zones outside state control, complete with administrative, judicial, fiscal, and security frameworks to consolidate authority and function as an alternative government. The experts highlighted that M23 has intensified recruitment, military training, coordinated troop movements, and operations across North and South Kivu, aided by close collaboration with the Rwandan army, which has enabled the group to expand its territorial and political influence. On 9 December, fighters reportedly entered Uvira late in the day, as heavy weapon detonations triggered widespread panic that forced businesses to close and residents to stay indoors, even though the city remained officially under government control. Governor Jean-Jacques Purusi Sadiki denied claims of rebel occupation, calling them "totally unfounded", and urged calm, while Radio Okapi noted that the M23 frequently uses disinformation to amplify fears of rebel advances.

Human Rights Watch also reported that thousands of Rwandan soldiers, including special forces, crossed into eastern DRC to support the M23. HRW noted that Rwandan and M23 forces entered the city after pushing out Congolese, Burundian, and allied Wazalendo forces using attack drones, heavy artillery, and other advanced weapons, an offensive that caused significant civilian casualties and displacement, with at least dozens of civilians killed or injured. By 10 December, the situation had stabilized, with Uvira confirmed under FARDC and Wazalendo authority and no evidence of M23 presence. FARDC concentrated security efforts on Kalundu Port, south of Uvira, while some residents continued fleeing toward Burundi. However, by 11:30 a.m., Uvira ultimately fell without resistance to M23. Eyewitnesses reported rebel fighters openly circulating through the city's main thoroughfares, while others advanced toward Kavinvira at the Burundian border. The takeover occurred without any confrontation, as FARDC had already retreated the previous day toward Swima, Makobola 1, Makobola 2, and Baraka in Fizi Territory. South Kivu's provincial authorities issued no official statement.

== Assessment ==
The fall of Uvira represented the loss of the FARDC's last major foothold in South Kivu, and cut off the border with Burundi, which was captured and closed by M23. Uvira was also the last major defensible position for government forces before Kalemie, the capital of Tanganyika Province, 285 miles to the south along RN5. It could be used by the group to launch an offensive towards Kalemie, or to support its advance into South Kivu's Mwenga and Shabunda territories to the west. Beyond the latter is Kindu, the capital of Maniema Province and a major FARDC base. However, to pose an existential threat to the DRC's government, the group would have to advance 500 miles south to reach the country's economic engine in the Katanga region, or 1,000 miles west to reach the national capital Kinshasa. M23 indicated that it will consolidate its control over Uvira and begin efforts to build an administration. More than 80 militia groups associated with the Wazalendo were based out of the city, and there are reported to be pockets of FARDC, Wazalendo, and FDNB remaining in the highlands above it.

The defeat of the FARDC, despite being supported by the FDNB and the Wazalendo militias, has been attributed to repeated purges, a "largely incompetent" high command, and long-existing major structural and logistical problems. The army's original reform plan, adopted in the years after the Second Congo War, was abandoned in 2015 during the Joseph Kabila administration, and Félix Tshisekedi did not make any substantial effort to reform the army. In 2025, "the Congolese soldier remains generally malnourished, poorly paid, and poorly equipped," without a clear command structure or logistical support. FARDC units are not rotated from the front line and experience high attrition. The few well-trained infantry battalions are not utilized effectively.

== Casualties and humanitarian impact ==
Escalation of violence and looting on 15 February in Uvira resulted in at least eighteen direct fatalities. Several fatalities occurred during attempted crossings of the Ruzizi River, including several children who drowned while attempting to reach safety in Burundi. In December 2025, United Nations and media sources reported that the second offensive, which involved the use of attack drones, large-caliber artillery, and other weaponry, resulted in at least 74 civilian deaths and 83 people wounded, with drone-dropped munitions striking residential areas and killing civilians who were fleeing the fighting or sheltering in their homes, including children. In Sange, a series of explosions caused at least 36 deaths, including civilians, with the blasts attributed to drone strikes and internal clashes between the FARDC and Wazalendo. A video filmed on 7 December showed more than 20 bodies lying near a main intersection, most in civilian clothing and some appearing to be children, while a civil society source reported that a single explosion killed a family of five, including children aged 13 and 15; additional videos recorded on 9 December showed volunteers digging graves near the site. On 9 December, radio journalist Janvier Lwesho Nyakirigo and his brother were killed when an explosion struck their home in Kiliba. The following day in Kasenga, M23 fighters shot dead two 25-year-old men in civilian clothing after accusing them of being Wazalendo, and later executed a 57-year-old man who refused to hand over his phone. Between 11–12 December, M23 fighters reportedly continued executing young men and suspected Wazalendo members, including apparently unarmed civilians, with residents and media describing numerous bodies in areas such as Kavimvira.

The 15 February killings triggered a massive displacement of local populations, particularly between Kamanyola and Sange, where about 70 percent of residents abandoned their homes. Roughly 25,000 internally displaced persons had already sought refuge in Uvira prior to the February escalations, with the actual number likely exceeding official estimates, as security conditions prevented comprehensive assessments. By 18 February, between 10,000 and 15,000 Congolese civilians fled to Burundi. Multiple humanitarian aid organizations were forced to evacuate their personnel. After the fall of Sange on 8 December, thousands of refugees fled from the area to nearby Fizi Territory, the Tanganyika Province, or across the border into Burundi. Among them were also hundreds of troops. Some FARDC soldiers and Wazalendo militiamen entered Burundi, where they were disarmed. The United Nations reported that roughly 200,000 people were displaced, including more than 30,000 who crossed into Bujumbura, Burundi, where refugees faced acute shortages after food aid in South Kivu was suspended by the World Food Programme. On 23 April 2026, around 470 Congolese refugees residing in Busuma camp were voluntarily repatriated to South Kivu through the Kavimvira border post in an operation jointly organized by the Burundian government and the United Nations High Commissioner for Refugees (UNHCR). The UN also stated that at least 33,000 refugees had returned to the DRC from Burundi by March 2026.

== Responses ==
=== Domestic ===
Armed clashes between FARDC and Wazalendo forces led to a widespread shutdown of civilian activities in Uvira. Educational institutions and commercial establishments ceased operations, while vehicular and pedestrian movement effectively came to standstill. Local governance structures were significantly impacted, with reports indicating that administrative leadership had relocated to either Kalemie or Bujumbura. A general hospital in Uviru reported receiving dozens of injuries from troops and civilians.

President Félix Tshisekedi, speaking at the Munich Security Conference, criticized the international community's limited response to Rwanda's alleged involvement, and accused former president Joseph Kabila of supporting opposing forces.

According to Burundian media, Lieutenant General Pacifique Masunzu, who was responsible for FARDC forces in the eastern DRC, was arrested on 2 November 2025, and taken to Kinshasa. The government did not make any official statement or comment on the reports. In the months leading up to that, 28 other generals had been arrested as the FARDC failed to stop the rebel advance in the east, and were accused of collusion with M23. It was also speculated that Masunzu was an ally of former president Joseph Kabila.

One of M23's leaders, Bertrand Bisimwa, said on 9 December 2025 that the group was still committed to the peace talks in Doha, Qatar, and that their recent actions near Uvira are a "counterattack".

=== International ===
The offensive prompted international diplomatic reactions. On 18 February, Foreign Office of the United Kingdom summoned Rwanda's ambassador in London. The office issued a statement condemning the territorial gains as violations of Congolese sovereignty and demanding the withdrawal of Rwandan Defence Force personnel from Congolese territory. On the same day, the United Nations' High Commissioner for Human Rights Volker Türk accused M23 of summarily killing children, attacking hospitals, and raiding and warehouses containing humanitarian aid. UN Secretary-General António Guterres urged against further regional escalation.

The African Union expressed concern about potential "balkanization" of the DRC, and called for M23's immediate withdrawal. France's Foreign Ministry demanded the withdrawal of both M23 and Rwandan forces, threatening additional multilateral sanctions against both parties.

On 6 December 2025, the Congolese military spokesman accused the RDF of increasing artillery strikes in South Kivu, and described it as Rwanda sabotaging the recently-signed Washington Accords. Rwandan Foreign Minister Olivier Nduhungirehe denied the allegation and called it "ridiculous" on 7 December. On 8 December, the foreign ministry of Burundi accused Rwanda of having 8,000 troops in South Kivu. Tshisekedi also accused Rwanda of violating the peace agreement, which was denied by Nduhungirehe. On 9 December, the United States and the European Union issued a joint statement which "urges the M23 and the Rwanda Defense Force (RDF) to immediately halt their offensive operations in eastern DRC, in particular in South Kivu, and calls on the RDF to withdraw from eastern DRC." The statement called on M23 to abide by the commitments made in the July 2025 declaration of principles. The US and EU also expressed concern for civilians.
