= 2025 Butembo offensive =

M23 campaign in North Kivu, DR Congo

Butembo offensive
- Part of the M23 campaign
Date	16 February — 2 May 2025 (1 year, 6 months and 6 days)
Location	North Kivu, Democratic Republic of the Congo
Status	Congolese and Ugandan victory: M23 captures several settlements but fails to take Butembo.

Belligerents
Congo River Alliance; March 23 Movement; Rwanda (Congolese claim)	DR Congo; Uganda

Commanders and leaders
Corneille Nangaa; Sultani Makenga	Evariste Somo (Military governor of North Kivu)

Units involved
M23 forces	FARDC; UPDF; Wazalendo

Strength
Unknown	(Uganda) 4,000-5,000 troops

Casualties and losses
Unknown	6-10 Wazalendo militiamen killed (friendly fire)

The 2025 Butembo offensive was a military operation conducted by March 23 Movement rebels in the eastern Democratic Republic of the Congo (DRC), with the goal of advancing towards and capturing the city of Butembo, 130 miles north of Goma. The military campaign followed the M23 capture of Bukavu, the provincial capital of South Kivu, occurring concurrently with advances towards Uvira in the neighboring South Kivu province.

== Background ==
After the M23's seizure of Bukavu, the provincial capital of South Kivu province, the M23 began attacks towards Butembo, the third largest city in North Kivu.

In light of the recent M23 offensives, and due to increasing attacks by the Allied Democratic Forces (ADF) militia on communities in the area, Uganda sent troops into the eastern DRC and took control of the city of Bunia, capital of the Ituri province. It is located north of Butembo. Their entry into the country was approved by the Congolese government.

== Offensive ==
At around 4:00 am on February 18, M23 and the RDF renewed offensives towards Lubero, a town in the region and a gateway to Butembo. M23 and RDF forces launched multiple attacks on entrenched FARDC positions on the strategic highlands of Vutsorovya, Alimbongo, Tchulo, and Mambasa, which are adjacent to National Road No.2, which is on route to Lubero and Butembo. Following these clashes, deserters of the FARDC have been reported looting Lubero, with civilians reporting bursts of gunfire and looting at the central market.

M23 captured the town of Kipese on February 20 while flanking FARDC positions along the RN2 road and in the capital of the Lubero Territory. On February 23, the FARDC stopped the M23 advance south of Lubero and east of the RN2 road, and prevented them from capturing Kasinjwe with the assistance of pro-government militias. On February 27 fighting broke out between M23 and government forces in Vunyakondomi village, located roughly half way between Kipese and Kasinjwe, as M23 continued with its attempt to flank the FARDC positions around Lubero.

An FARDC military court sentenced to death 55 soldiers in Lubero on February 28 for desertion and committing violent crimes, while several others were given prison sentences.

M23 moved westward and captured the village of Kasugho, located southwest of Lubero, from FARDC and pro-government militias on March 2. Ten members of the Wazalendo militia in the city of Butembo were reported killed on March 4 during infighting among two factions. The Ugandan People's Defence Force blocked M23 from advancing in the direction of Lubero from the town of Kagheri, and they withdrew to Kasugho.

From April 28, M23 advanced on several villages along the shore of Lake Edward, capturing Lunyasenge and multiple other villages on May 2 after fighting with FARDC and Wazalendo. M23 fighters reached the area by boat.

== Reactions ==
The United States has called on Rwanda to withdraw its forces from the DRC and sanctioned a M23 spokesperson as part of their pressure campaign.

The United Nations under-secretary-general for peacekeeping operations, Jean-Pierre Lacroix, visited the city of Beni on 1 March, where he met with military governor, Maj. Gen. Evariste Somo. They spoke about the "catastrophic consequences" of the M23 uprising on the humanitarian situation in the Kivu region and the need to obtain a ceasefire in accordance with United Nations Security Council Resolution 2773. Somo noted that the UN's MONUSCO mission is an important strategic partner of the DRC and expressed willingness to work to with it to alleviate the humanitarian and security situation.
