= Trevor Roberts =

Trevor Roberts is the name of:

- Trevor Roberts (footballer) (1942–1972), Welsh footballer
- Trevor Roberts, 2nd Baron Clwyd (1900–1987), Welsh peer
- Trevor Roberts, creator of Mystery Flesh Pit National Park
