= Nothing Without Women =

Feminist organization in the DR of the Congo

Nothing Without Women (Rien sans les Femmes) is a feminist organization established in the Democratic Republic of the Congo in 2015.

Nothing Without Women was formed in March 2015 as a coalition of international NGOs and local women's groups in eastern Democratic Republic of the Congo. The group had two aims: to ensure that the Parity Act was passed into law, and to revise electoral law to ensure that women candidates must be included on all electoral lists. The group collected over 200,000 signatures. It organized marches in Bukavu and Uvira in South Kivu, and Goma in North Kivu. Over 6,000 people joined the march in Bukavu. As a result, the Parity Act was successfully passed in August 2015.

By 2017 Nothing Without Women had grown to incorporate over 160 women's rights organisations from across the country. Group campaigns were easily recognizable by their use of vividly coloured patterned cloth, worn as headscarves, dresses, skirts or bags.

In August 2018 the group's spokesperson Solange Lwashiga Furaha expressed concern that only 12% of candidates for the 2018 general election were women:

The fact that there is less than 15 per cent of women is a significant issue. Most of society in DRC are still reticent about women being able to vote. There is lack of resources within the electoral campaigns, there is lack of resources to encourage voters to go out and vote for women, and there are also problems surrounding the voting machines.
