= Anodyne (disambiguation) =

An anodyne is an archaic term for a painkiller drug.

Anodyne may also refer to:

- Anodyne (album), by Uncle Tupelo
- Anodyne (band), American hardcore band
- Anodyne (video game), a 2013 independent video game
- Anodyne corporation, fictional company in the Mystery Flesh Pit National Park science fiction/horror project
- Anodyne morphism
- Anodyne Records, American record label
- "Anodyne Sea", track and single from the album The Powerless Rise
