= Solange Lwashiga Furaha =

Human and women's rights activist

- Education: L'Institut supérieur pédagogique de Bukavu
- Occupations: Human and women's rights activist

Solange Lwashiga Furaha is a human and women's rights activist from the Democratic Republic of the Congo and the executive secretary of the South Kivu Congolese Women's Caucus for Peace (Caucus des Femmes Congolaises du Sud-Kivu pour la Paix).

== Early life ==
Solange Lwashiga Furaha was educated at L'Institut supérieur pédagogique de Bukavu, a teacher training college in Bukavu, from where she earned a bachelor's degree in pedagogy in the Department of African Culture.

Furaha was a secondary school teacher for over ten years before she became a member of the South Kivu Congolese Women's Caucus for Peace (Caucus des Femmes Congolaises du Sud-Kivu pour la Paix). The organisation has been one of International Alert's DRC partners since 2003.

Furaha is now the executive secretary of the South Kivu Congolese Women's Caucus for Peace.

In her role as an active member of the International Campaign to Stop Rape and Gender Violence, Furaha attended 2013's African Union Summit and demanded action from the Congolese government to stop rape in conflict. She remains involved in urging African leaders to focus on dealing with violence against women in the Congo.

In February 2014, Furaha took part in Beauty in the Middle: Women of Congo Speak Out, when the International Campaign to Stop Rape and Gender Violence in Conflict travelled to the east of her country with photographer Pete Muller and the filmmakers Jon Bougher and Kohl Threlkeld, to record the women working in the grassroots of activism.

Furaha is the national contact point for Rien sans les femmes, a coalition of Congolese women's rights organizations.

Furaha believes that only by ensuring that women are included in all peace talks will DR Congo ever find peace.

== Personal life ==
Furaha lives in the city of Bukavu, in the South Kivu province of the Democratic Republic of the Congo.
