= Douce Namwezi N'Ibamba =

Congolese journalist

- Born: 11 February 1989 (age 37); Bukavu, Zaire
- Education: Université officielle de Bukavu
- Occupations: Social entrepreneur; activist; journalist
- Employer: Uwezo Afrika

Douce Namwezi N'Ibamba (born 11 February 1989) is a journalist, radio producer and social entrepreneur from the Democratic Republic of the Congo (DRC), who empowers women through education and training, with a particular emphasis on gender equality and menstrual hygiene. She is also the president of the board of the cultural space called, Espace Culturel Kwetu Art.

== Biography ==
Namwezi was born on 11 February 1989, in Bukavu in South Kivu, Zaire. Her parents are both nurses. She is one of eight children. When she was eight years old the family had to flee from their home and were refugees for a time. She studied at the Alfajiri Jesuit School and later graduated with a degree in International Relations from the Université officielle de Bukavu (fr). From a young age, Namwezi knew that she wanted to be a journalist, but was told by many people that it was not a job for women – gender discrimination is rife in the DRC.

Namwezi was determined and began producing radio programs at the age of 16 when she joined the Association des Femmes des Media du Sud Kivu (AFEM) of the Democratic Republic of Congo. At the time, the DRC was at war and Namwezi reported stories of former child soldiers and mass rape. After 10 years with the AFEM, she was promoted to coordinator.

In 2016, Namwezi worked as program manager at MAMA Radio, a women's radio station focused solely on promoting gender equality. In 2018 she left MAMA Radio to found the Uwezo Afrika Initiative, a non-profit company focused on fighting taboos around menstruation through education and awareness raising around sexual hygiene. This is achieved through journalism, job training and social entrepreneurship to achieve women's empowerment. They also disseminate sexual health and menstrual hygiene kits to women in the DRC. These include reusable and washable menstrual pads.

== Awards ==
- BBC's 100 Women list, 2020.
- Courageous Action Award from the Centre for Nonviolence and Peace Studies of the University of Rhode Island, 2016.
- "New Strategies for Empowering Women" citation from UN WOMEN and the World Congress of Global Partnership for Young Women, 2012.

== Personal life ==
As of 2022 Namwezi lived in Bukavu, with her husband and three children. Her husband is Placide Nyenyezi Ntole, a lawyer at the Court of Appeal in Bukavu.
