= Kadutu =

Coordinates: 2°30′56″S 28°51′09″E

Kadutu is a commune in Bukavu, South Kivu, Democratic Republic of the Congo.

Kadutu was one of the worst affected places during the Bukavu floods of 2022.
