= 2022 Bukavu floods =

Flooding in the Democratic Republic of the Congo in 2022

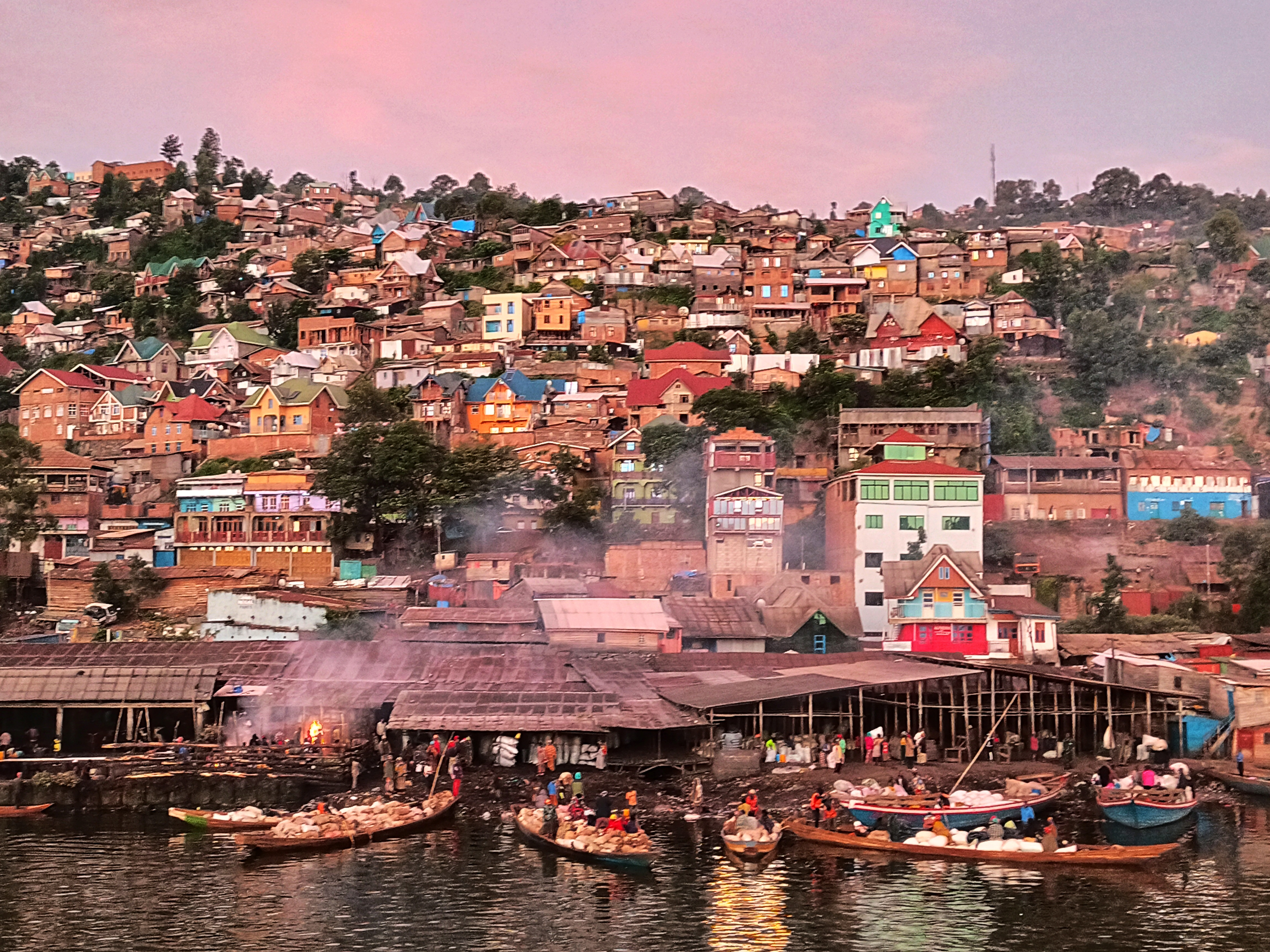
- Bukavu
- Date: 22 February 2022–16 March 2022
- Location: Bukavu, South Kivu, Democratic Republic of the Congo
- Deaths: 16

In early 2022, heavy rain caused large floods to hit the city of Bukavu, South Kivu, Democratic Republic of the Congo.

== Events ==
On 22 February 2022, six people including four children died after heavy rain caused flooding.

On 16 March, flooding struck in Bukavu City and surrounding areas of South Kivu Province, on the shores of Lake Kivu and close to the border with Rwanda. Local media reported that homes, roads and vehicles were damaged. Powerful flood waters swept away cars and dumped them into Lake Kivu. One of the worst affected areas was the commune of Kadutu. 10 people were killed and hundreds of homes were destroyed.
