= Cor Akim =

Congolese musician (born 1992)

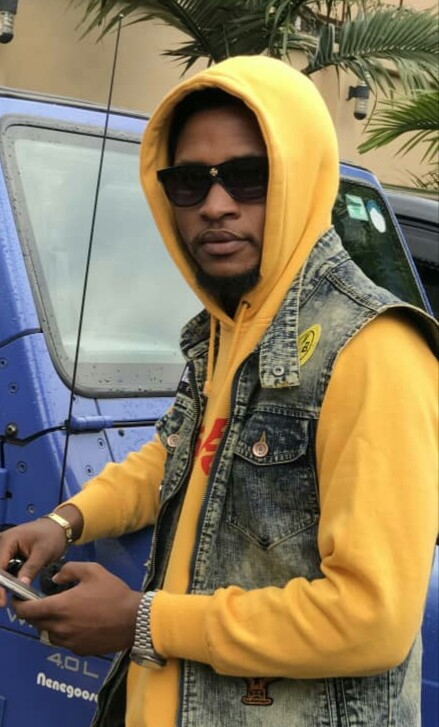
- Cor Akim

Background information
- Also known as: Le Prince Akim
- Born: Corneille Akilimali Bufole; 4 August 1992 (age 33); Bukavu, South Kivu, Zaire
- Genres: Pop; R&B; dancehall; urban pop; dance-pop; Afropop; Gospel
- Occupations: Singer; Songwriter; Pianist; Composer
- Instruments: Vocals, piano
- Years active: 2014–present
- Label: MakSpeakers

Corneille Akilimali Bufole (4 August 1992), better known as Cor Akim, is a Congolese singer, songwriter, pianist and worship leader, born in Bukavu, capital of South Kivu Province in eastern Democratic Republic of Congo and based in Nairobi in Kenya.

== Biography ==
Cor Akim was born on 4 August 1992 in Bukavu, South Kivu in Zaire. After having accompanied Lokua Kanza on stage during a campaign against sexual violence in February 2014, organized by the global activist movement V-Day, Cor Akim decided to record his first album "Homme de rêve", featured songs like Sorry really and Mwasi in 2016 which revealed him to the public in the both provinces of North and South Kivu.

In 2018, he dropped the song Mon Vote, which is about the 2018 presidential election in the Democratic Republic of Congo. This song is said to be the cause of his abduction during the electoral campaign the night of 8-9 December 2018 after a karaoke evening where he was invited. Ever since, Akim relocated to Kenya due to security issues and shifted to gospel music with his first song "Glory" released in July 2019, followed by "Abba" in 2020 and "Mkuu" on 1 August 2022.

== Discography ==
=== Album studio ===
- 2016: The Greatest
- 2014: Hommes de rêves

=== Singles ===
- 2018: Mon vote
- 2018: Tu peux compter sur moi
- 2017: Un de plus grands
- 2017: Kiuno chako
- 2016: Mwasi
- 2016: Sorry Really
- 2016: Ma femme
- 2016: Mama
- 2016: Mea culpa
- 2016: Tuijenge Congo
- 2016: Je suis Kivu
- 2015: Christmas Wish
- 2019: Te rencontrer
- 2019: Et si tu pouvais
- 2019: Glory
- 2020: Abba
- 2022: Mkuu

=== Collaborations ===
- 2017: Nipe – Big Denty ft. Cor Akim
- 2015: Umoja Bondeni – Voldie Mapenzi ft. Cor Akim, Kinjaah
- 2015: You and I – Kinjaah ft. Cor Akim

== Awards ==
- 2012: Best male pianist in South Kivu, which earned him his first international appearance in a publication of the RNW (Radio Netherland Worldwide), under his former name, that of Corneille Akim.
- 2016: Kivu Top5: Sorry Really Best song in Kivu at the RTNK (Radio TV Ngoma ya Kivu).
