= Multifunction platform =

Multifunction Platform (MFP) is a concept and a structure developed by UNDP and deployed in a number of West African countries, and Tanzania and Zambia. The idea has been to place an MFP in a village which, driven by a diesel engine, powers devices such as pumps and grain mills and generators. The UNDP has produced a number of reports on this project in Mali. There are few independent analyses of the development impact of the concept of the multifunctional platform, but an article in the journal Energy Policy provide a more nuanced view of programme achievements than impact assessments made public at earlier stages of the project.

The primary impact of the MFP has been on women's work (on reducing daily drudgery and opening up new opportunities in life) and the UNDP's deployment has been to women's organisations, with part local funding and part local grant.

In places where Jatropha is grown, a device, powered by the MFP, can crush the Jatropha seed. The oil produced is suitable for running the diesel engine, allowing the MFP to produce fuel for its own operation. The company Mali Biocarburant has carried out a pilot with in a number of villages in Mali. Also, the Mali Folke Centre has reported on its success in this field. Between 1999 and 2004, 500 MFPs were distributed in Mali.

More recently, the FACT Foundation has implemented a pilot programme in which biogas is used for co-fuelling MFP diesel engines. In five villages in Mali, biogas systems were installed and connected to the MFP diesel engines. First results look promising, although further work is required to improve the management of the biogas systems.

Volunteers from Engineers Without Borders have been involved with assessment of some MFP projects.

Whereas the UNDP's projects have involved substantial injection of foreign expert advice, a low budget self-initiated approach was in recent times taken in Kiliba, DRC at Farm of Hope, a project of Fondation Chirezi. However, that project failed to materialise.
