= Jeannette Kavira Mapera =

- Born: 8 April 1963
- Occupations: Minister of Culture and Arts in the Democratic Republic of the Congo

Jeannette Kavira Mapera (born 8 April 1963) is the current Minister of Culture and Arts in the Democratic Republic of the Congo. She is a member of the Federalist Christian Democracy-Convention of Federalists for Christian Democracy (DCF-COFEDEC).

== Biography ==
Kavira was born in the eastern city of Bukavu on April 8, 1963. She attended the University of Kinshasa and graduated with a degree in Economics and International Economics.

In the 2006 general election, Kavira was elected to the National Assembly as a delegate of Lubero territory in North Kivu province.

She also served briefly as the Deputy Managing Director of Cohydro, a Congolese hydrocarbon company.

She took office as Minister of Culture and Arts on 23 February 2010, succeeding Ezra Kambale, the previous Minister.
