= Bagira =

Coordinates: 2.4713°S 28.8276°E

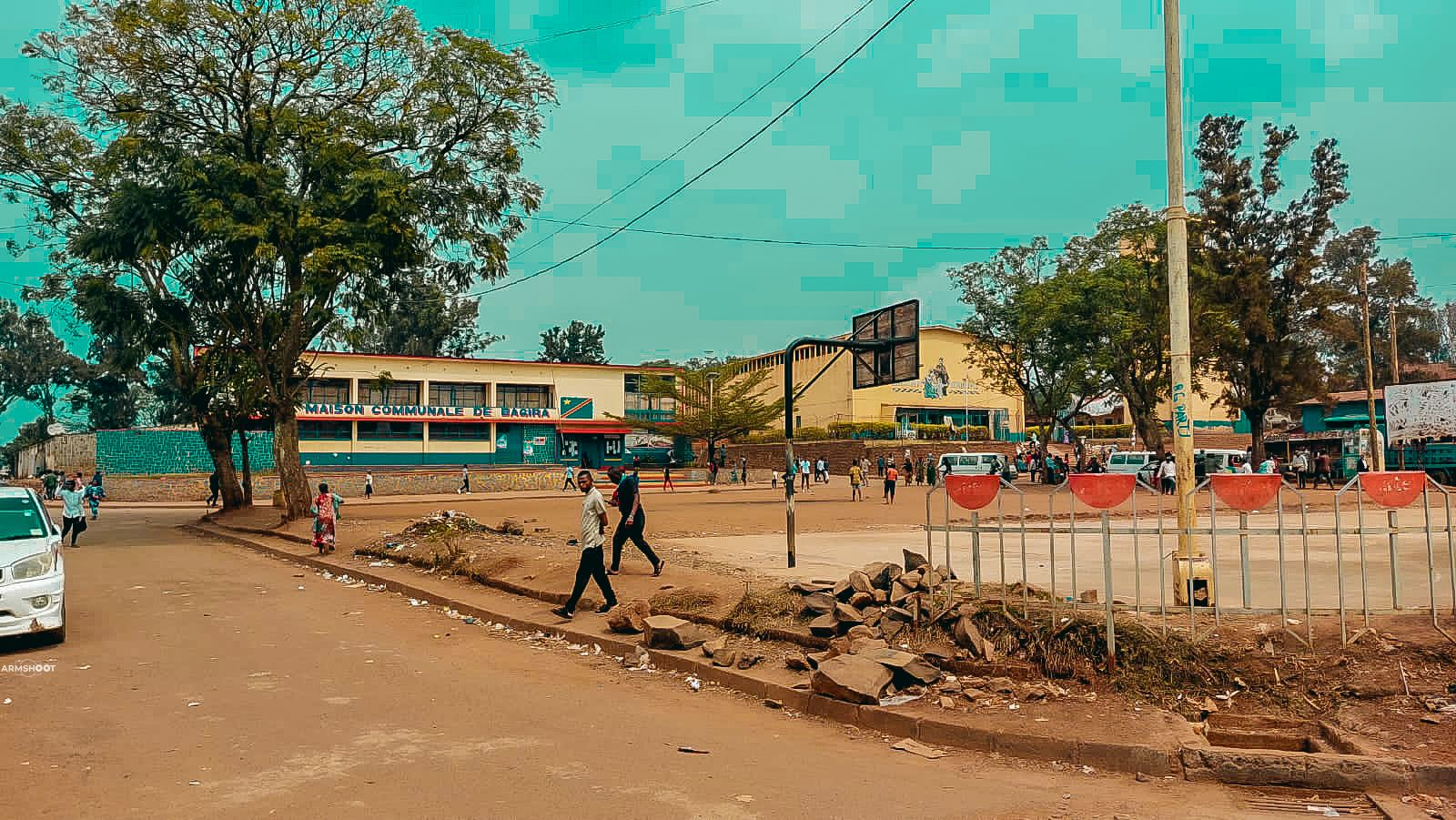
A communal house in Bagira

Bagira is one of the communes in Bukavu, South Kivu in the Democratic Republic of the Congo. Thousands of displaced people arrived there in the early 2000s as a result of the conflict (Congo wars) in the eastern Democratic Republic of the Congo, and it was stated that it was "not uncommon" at the time for "twenty or more people there to share one small house".

== International relations ==
=== Twin towns and sister cities ===
Bagira is twinned with:

- Jemeppe-sur-Sambre, Belgium
