= 2025 Bukavu offensive =

M23 campaign in South Kivu, DR Congo

Bukavu offensive
- Part of the M23 campaign
Date	5 February – 16 February 2025; (1 week and 4 days)
Location	South Kivu, Democratic Republic of the Congo
Result	M23 victory: M23 rebels capture Bukavu; Withdrawal of Burundian forces from eastern DRC

Belligerents
Congo River Alliance: March 23 Movement; Rwanda (Congolese claim)	DR Congo; Burundi

Commanders and leaders
Corneille Nangaa; Sultani Makenga	(Democratic Republic of the Congo) Felix Tshisekedi; (Democratic Republic of the Congo) Jean-Jacques Purusi (Governor of South Kivu); (Democratic Republic of the Congo) Jackson Kamba (defected)

Units involved
M23 forces	FARDC; Congolese National Police

Casualties and losses
Unknown	2300+ Congolese National Police defected
- 100+ killed; 1,000+ displaced

The 2025 Bukavu offensive was a military operation conducted by M23 rebels in the eastern Democratic Republic of the Congo (DRC), centered around their advance toward Bukavu, the provincial capital of South Kivu. This military campaign began in February 2025, following the group's successful capture of Goma in the neighboring North Kivu province, and concluded with the M23 rebels’ successful capture of Bukavu just over a week later.

== Background ==
The M23's expansion into South Kivu occurred in the aftermath of their capture of Goma, North Kivu's capital, in January 2025. The deputy head of MONUSCO, Vivian van de Perre, said on January 28 that the Angolan-mediated peace process needed to be restarted to "avert the looming threat of a third Congo war." The African Union Peace and Security Council held an emergency meeting on January 28, where it focused on the need to obtain a ceasefire. The M23 announced a humanitarian ceasefire on February 3, 2025, citing concerns for aid delivery and displaced populations. However, both the Congolese government and United Nations sources reported continued military operations, with the government characterizing the ceasefire announcement as "false communication."

The M23-led rebel alliance, through their spokesperson Lawrence Kanyuka, justified potential military action by citing the need to protect civilians from what they described as ongoing violence and pillaging in Bukavu. Their statement on social media platform Twitter/X warned of intervention if the reported attacks on civilians continued.

== Offensive ==
On February 5, 2025, M23 forces captured the strategic mining town of Nyabibwe, positioned halfway between Goma and Bukavu. United Nations officials confirmed rebel forces had advanced to within 50 kilometres (31 miles) of Bukavu, while maintaining control over Goma's transportation infrastructure, including all exit routes and the city's airport. Approximately 10,000 Burundian troops were deployed in South Kivu to support Congolese forces. On February 9, refugees departing from a displacement camp west of Goma claimed that they were ordered to leave by a M23 colonel who had entered the camp. Rebel forces temporarily halted their advance following the call for a ceasefire made by the leaders of the East African Community (EAC) and the Southern African Development Community (SADC) at the exceptional summit held in Tanzania on February 8.

The offensive resumed with an attack taking place at the dawn of February 11, when M23 forces struck near the village of Ihusi after advancing along the Bukavu-Goma road between the village and Muhongoza. This location held strategic significance due to its proximity to critical infrastructure, positioned approximately 40 kilometres (25 miles) from the Kavumu Airport and 70 kilometres (43 miles) from Bukavu. The assault marked the end of a brief two-day pause in military operations. At the time, the Congolese military was reportedly utilizing the airport as a primary logistics hub. Local observers reported significant artillery exchanges along the frontline, with heavy weapons fire heard throughout the area. UN observers reported Rwandan troop movements into South Kivu.

Several reports of misconduct were reported the Congolese armed forces amid the offensive. A military tribunal in Bukavu commenced proceedings against 84 defendants, including both military personnel and civilians, accused of multiple serious offenses. The charges stemmed from incidents that occurred when the accused allegedly abandoned their positions during combat operations in Karehe territory, with evidence of crimes occurring in Kabare, Katana, Murhesa, Mululu, Mudaka, Miti, and Bukavu. In Kavumu, several soldiers reportedly entered a bar-restaurant, conducted armed robbery, and fatally shot seven civilians. The defendants were also charged with causing public disorder and unauthorized weapons discharges.

On February 13, M23 forces captured Kalehe Centre— the primary commercial center of Kalehe Territory— and Ihusi. Several civilian casualties were reported, with many residents fleeing en masse to several directions, including to Idjwi and other islands in Lake Kivu.

On February 14, M23 forces surrounded and claimed control of Kavumu Airport, located approximately 30 kilometres (19 miles) from Bukavu. Local witnesses reported observing government forces retreating from the area during the confrontation. M23 spokesperson Lawrence Kanyuka justified the airport's seizure as a necessary measure to "eliminate the threat at the source," claiming the facility posed a danger to civilian populations.

Shortly following this, M23 rebels initiated their advance into Bukavu through the city's Bagira and Kazingu zones, progressing toward the city center. Local residents documented the rebels' movement, with video footage showing their march toward the Bagira area. The advancement was accompanied by reports of gunfire in various parts of the city, according to Jean Samy, vice-president of the civil society in South Kivu.

By February 15, widespread looting engulfed Bukavu as mobs of youth ransacked businesses, government offices, and shops, while many residents sought refuge indoors. Some struggled to escape M23 rebels, while women feared venturing outside due to the risk of sexual violence. The World Food Programme's Bukavu depot, storing 6,800 metric tons of humanitarian food supply, was looted. The civil disorder combined with reports of gunfire throughout the city and lack of security forces led to many civilians sheltering in place to avoid danger, resulting in many streets being emptied. Several injuries were reported as a result of the riots, with local residents claiming that Congolese troops were taking part in looting and arson of the city. Seventy tied-up bodies were reported in a church located in Mayba, a northern suburb of Bukavu. Media shared online reportedly showed young teenagers using firearms to pillage areas and extort civilians. It was later reported that M23 executed a significant number of children during the occupation, though the precise number of casualties remained unverified.

On February 16, the DRC government reported that Bukavu had fallen to occupying M23 rebels, who set up positions at the regional governor's office. While certain groups greeted them with cheers, protests erupted across the city, particularly in the vicinity of the Governorate, as residents hesitantly left their homes in response to the occupation. M23 troops encountered minimal resistance from the Congolese military, with reports of FARDC personnel evacuating alongside civilians. Addressing a gathered crowd outside the Governorate, M23 leader Bernard Maheshe Byamungu vowed to "clean up the disorder left over from the old regime" and accused the Congolese government of abandoning them to a jungle-like existence. Some members of the audience voiced support for M23, urging the group to advance toward Kinshasa. Meanwhile, a significant civilian exodus from Bukavu took place, and by the following day, Burundian authorities reported the arrival of approximately 10,000 Congolese refugees. Many crossed into Burundi through the Gatumba border post, while others traversed the Ruzizi River into Bubanza and Cibitoke provinces.

== Reactions ==
=== Domestic ===
Authorities in Bukavu began implementing emergency measures in anticipation of potential M23 advances on the city. Authorities initiated preventive actions, including the closure of educational institutions on February 7. The threat of an imminent attack also prompted widespread civilian responses, with residents evacuating the area and commercial establishments suspending operations, including banks and shops.

Videos posted to social media appeared to show civilians of Kabamba and Katana cheering M23 soldiers as they spoke to crowds while in the process of advancing south. After the capture of the city, the DRC government urged residents to "stay at home and not expose themselves to avoid being targeted by the occupying forces".

=== International ===
The United Nations and several Western nations maintained that Rwanda provided support and armament to the M23 rebels during the offensive. These allegations were consistently denied by Rwandan government officials. Prime Minister of the DRC Judith Suminwa demanded the withdrawal of Rwandan troops from DRC territory.

Secretary-General of the United Nations António Guterres urged against further escalation caused by conflict in South Kivu, warning that further conflict could "push the entire region over the precipice".
