= Fondation Chirezi =

Fondation Chirezi (FOCHI) is a local non-governmental organisation established in the African Great Lakes Region by Floribert Kazingufu Kasirusiru (Flory Zozo). The core objective of FOCHI is to build a campaign for a non-killing society in the Great Lakes Region - eastern parts of the Democratic Republic of the Congo (DRC) which has suffered both the Second Congo War and terrible waves of genocide in both Rwanda and Burundi.

"Since the early 1990s the African Great Lakes region – defined here as the Democratic Republic of Congo (DRC), Burundi, Rwanda, Uganda and Tanzania – has been convulsed by genocide, civil wars, inter-state conflict and flawed democratic transitions. With UN-sponsored peace processes underway in DRC and Burundi and projects of state and societal reconstruction apparently advancing in Rwanda and Uganda, there are hopes that the epoch of violence and exploitation in the African Great Lakes region is finally drawing to an end."

FOCHI is a local non-governmental initiative with activities including conduct of seminars for ministers of religion and teachers alike, with an objective to create awareness and shift entrenched attitudes. FOCHI, with priority concern for women and children, has built several local projects. The first project is named Farm of Hope School for orphans and children of single parent families at Kiliba, DRC, a border crossing town on the Ruzizi River, near Bujumbura (Burundi's largest city and former capital). The second one is a Women's Trauma and Care Centre in Bukavu, the capital of Sud-Kivu Province in the DRC, managed by Women Against Violence. The situation of women in and around Bukavu has become perilous in the period of the Second Congo War and its aftermath.

In July 2007, three communities working under the FOCHI umbrella - Kiliba Farm of Hope School, the Bukavu Women's Trauma and Care Centre, and Nyangezi (seeking community radio for youth) formed a Self-Empowering Network (SEN) to strengthen their approach to development and mutual help to the country.
