= Bukavu =

Provincial capital of South Kivu Province, Democratic Republic of the Congo

Bukavu: Mji wa Bukavu (Swahili); Omungini gw'eBukavu (Shi)
- Provincial capital and city
- Ville de Bukavu
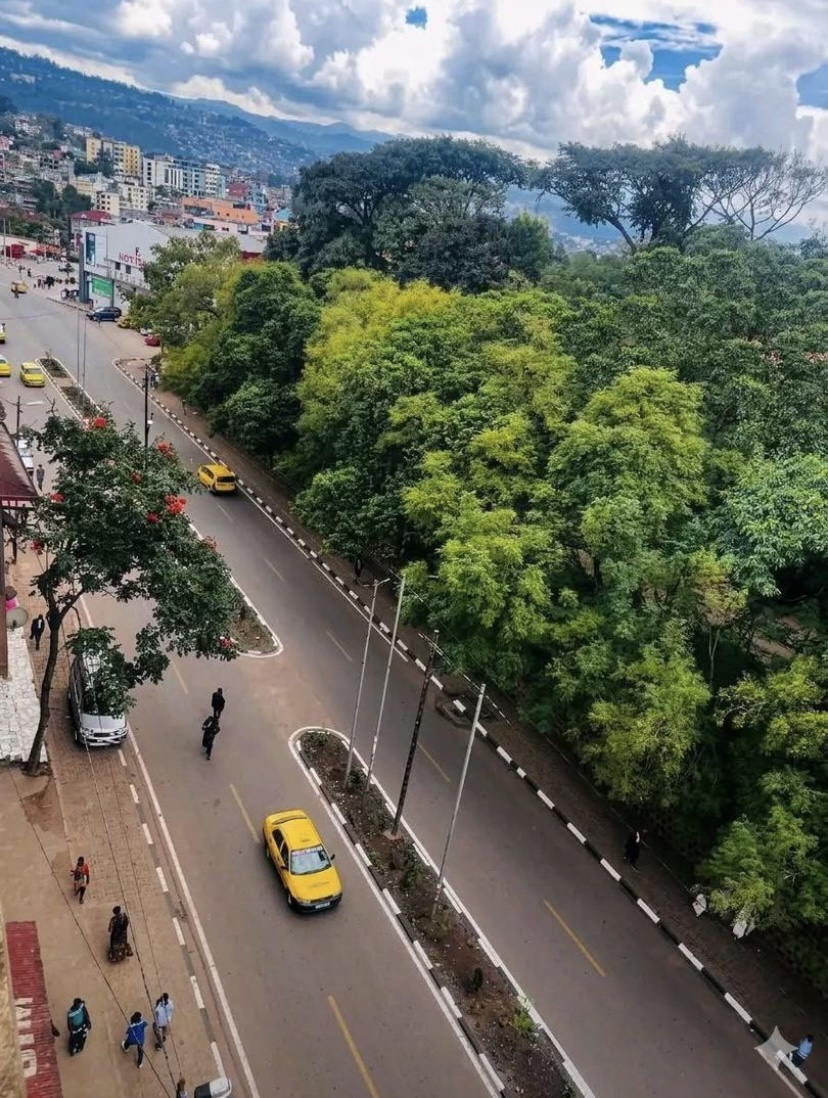
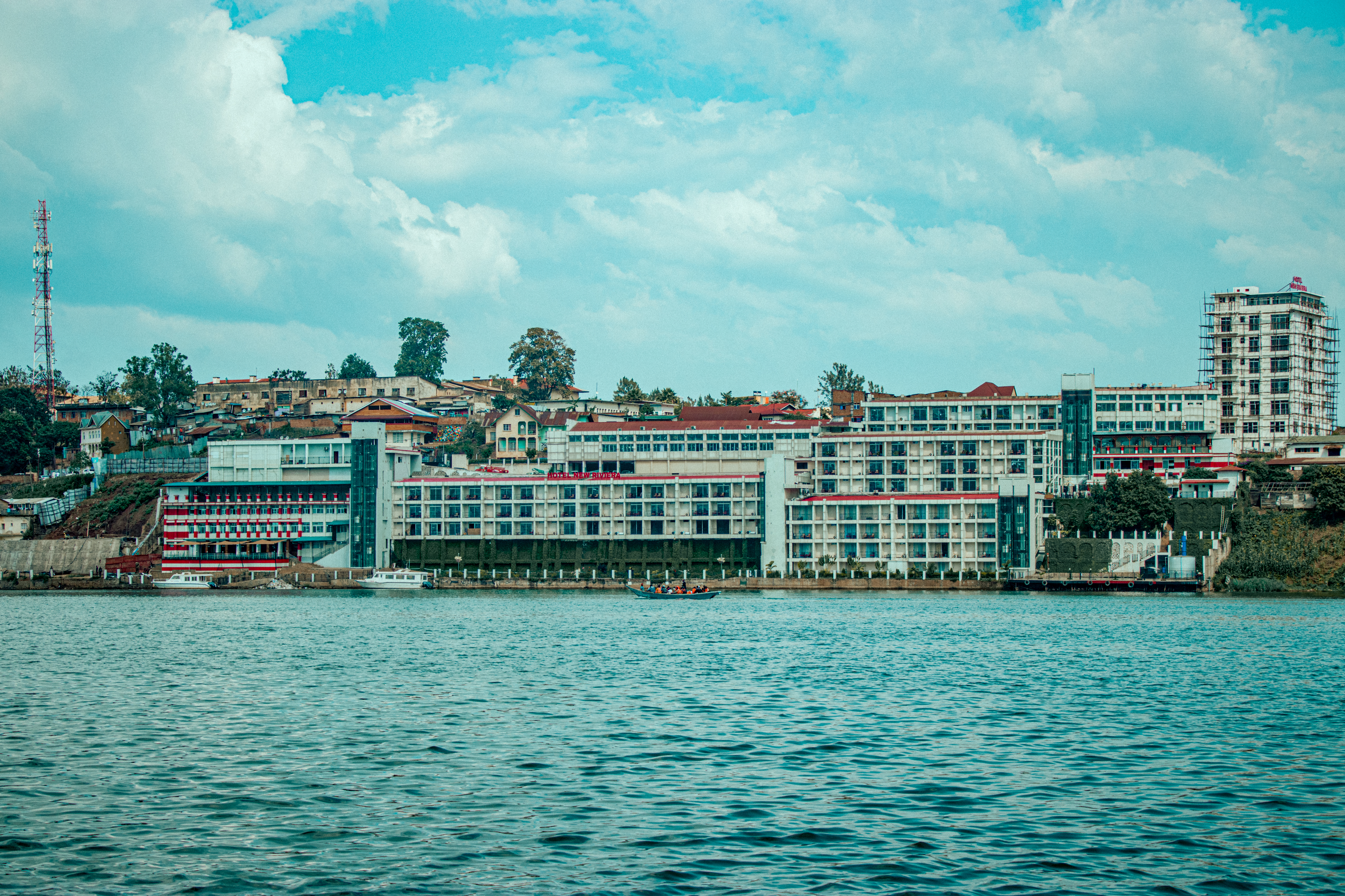
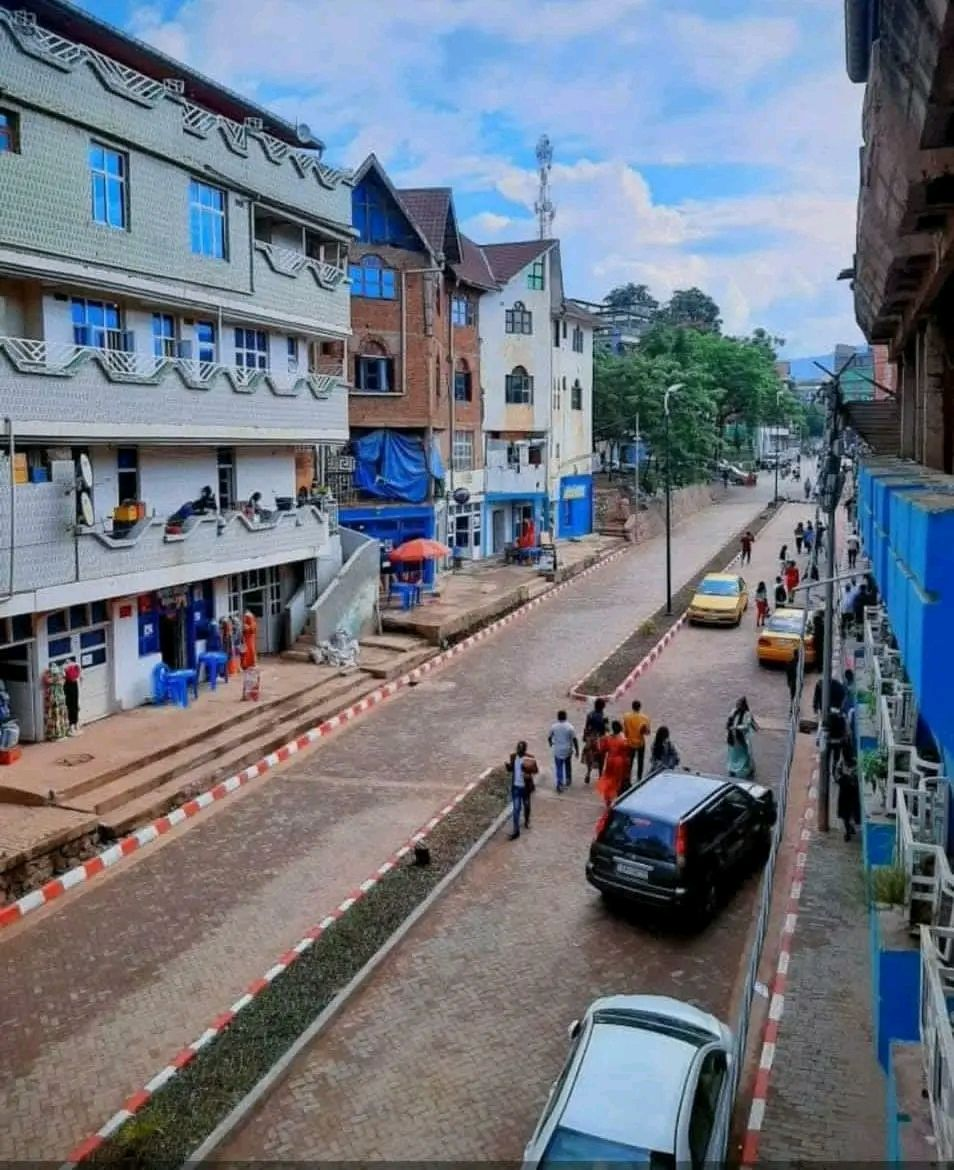
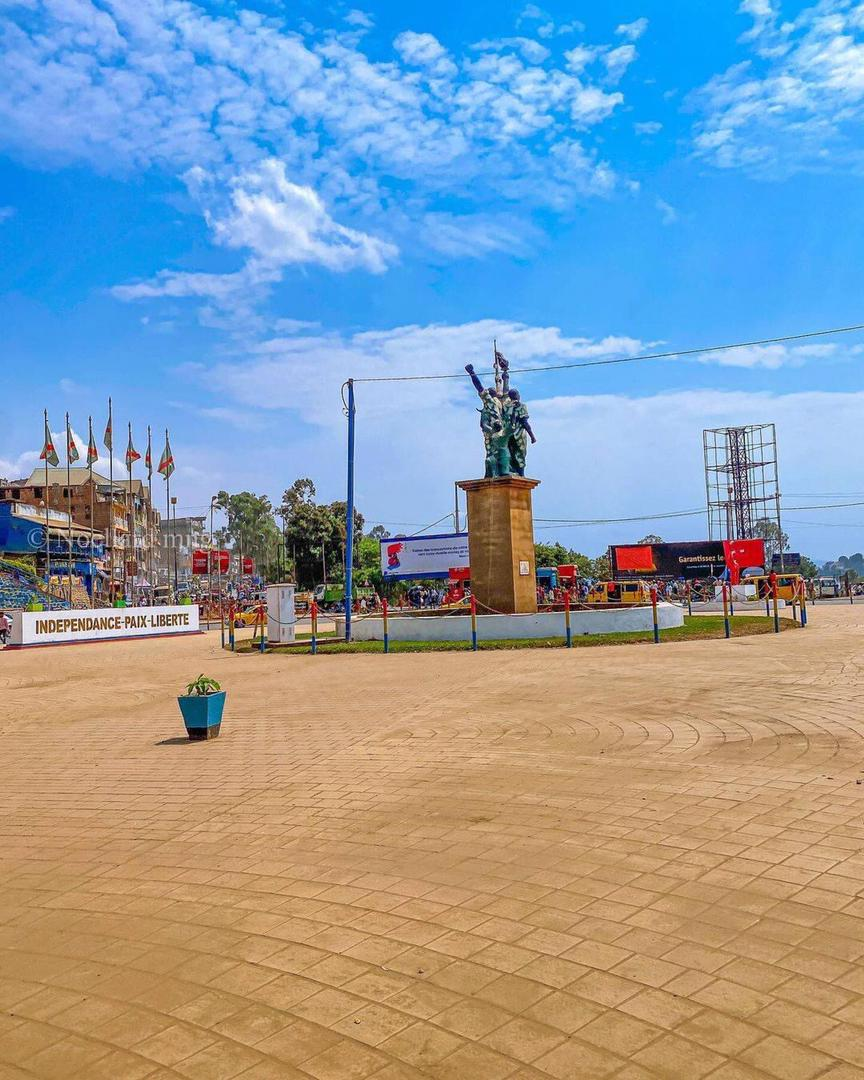
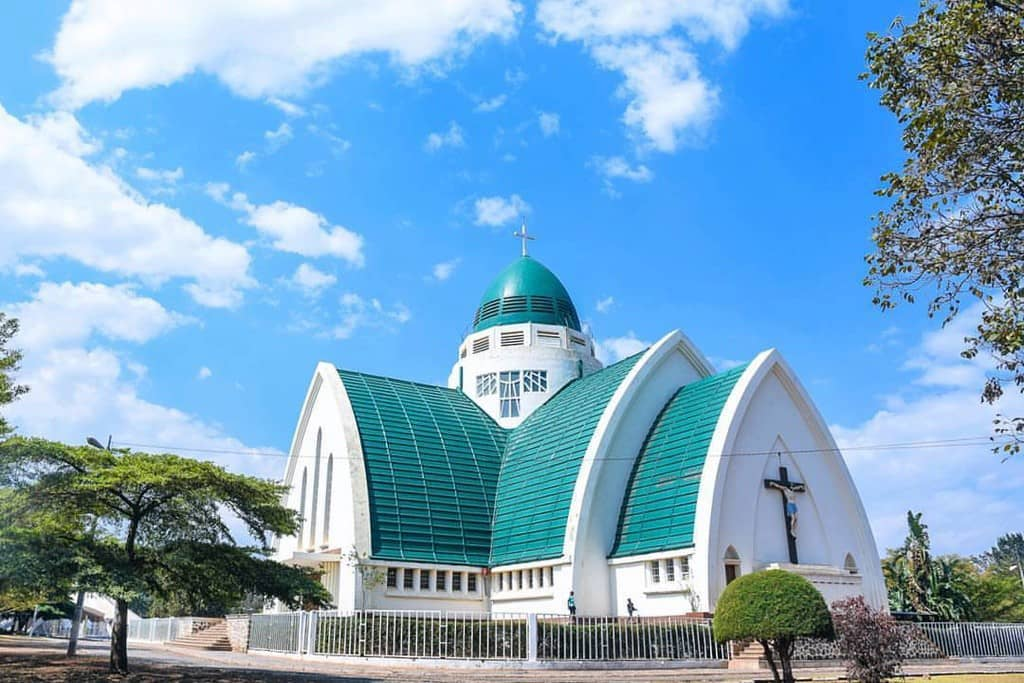
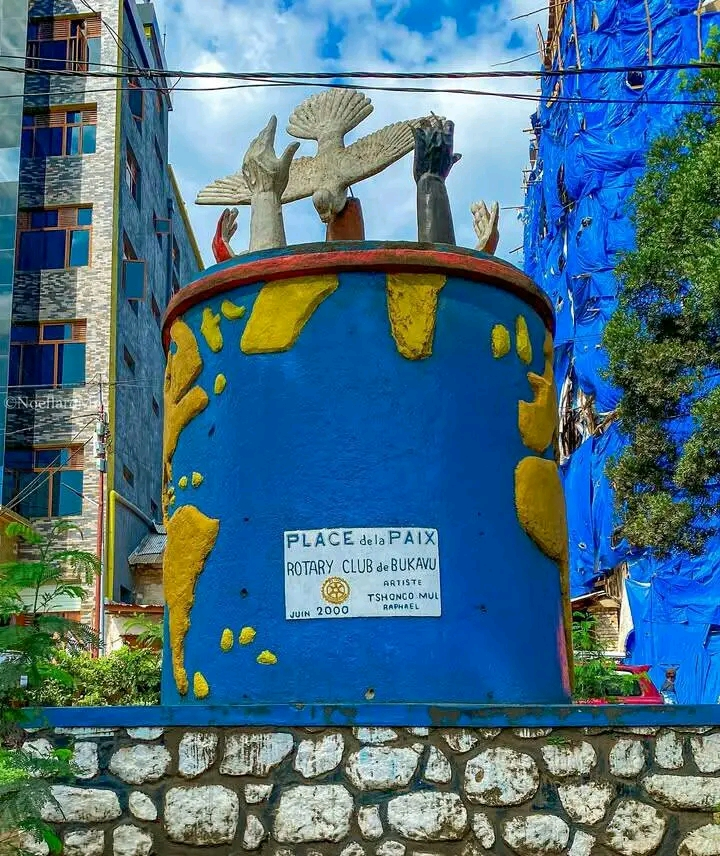
- View of Bukavu Hôtel New Riviera Neighbourhood in Bukavu Place de l‘independance Our Lady of Peace Cathedral Momunent Place de la Paix
- Interactive map of Bukavu
- Location in the Democratic Republic of the Congo
- Coordinates: 2°30′22″S 28°51′39″E
- Country: DR Congo
- Province: South Kivu
- Control: Congo River Alliance
- Founded: 1901
- City status: 1958
- Communes: Bagira, Ibanda, Kadutu

Government
  - Mayor: Zénon Karumba
- Elevation: 1,498 m (4,915 ft)

Population (2016)
  - City: 870,954
  - Density: 19,355/km^{2} (50,130/sq mi)
  - Urban: 1,133,000
  - Ethnicities: Bashi; Bavira; Babembe; Barega
- Time zone: UTC+2 (Central Africa Time)
- Climate: Cwb,Aw

Bukavu is a city in eastern Democratic Republic of the Congo (DRC), lying at the extreme south-western edge of Lake Kivu, west of Cyangugu in Rwanda, and separated from it by the outlet of the Ruzizi River. It is the capital of the South Kivu Province and as of 2012 it had an estimated population of 806,940.

In 2021 it has an estimated urban population of 1,133,000.

== History ==
Bukavu is part of the ancient territory of Bushi Kingdom, an ethnic group of South-Kivu. It was governed by a "Muluzi" Nyalukemba, when the first Arabs arrived. They were traders and often trafficked in enslaved Africans; they were influential in much of Africa.

Near the end of the 19th century, Europeans entered Bushi, and the Congo Free State attempted to colonize the large territory. 'Muluzi' or 'Baluzi' in the plural means 'the nobleman' or 'nobility' to Shi. Before the Europeans came in Bushi Kingdom, Bukavu was called "Rusozi". The name Bukavu comes from the transformation of word 'bu 'nkafu ' (farm of cows) in Mashi, the language of Bashi.

Bukavu was established in 1901 by the Congo Free State which became the Belgian Congo in 1908. Originally named Bukavu, it was named "Costermansville" (in French) or "Costermansstad" (in Dutch) in 1927, after Vice Governor-General Paul Costermans. In 1953, the name was changed back to Bukavu. It had a prominent European population under colonial rule. They were attracted by the subtropical climate (Lake Kivu is 1,500 metres above sea level) and scenic location (Bukavu is built on five peninsulas and has been described as "a green hand, dipped in the lake"). Many colonial villas have gardens sloping down to the lakeshore.

By contrast, the main residential district for ordinary people, Kadutu, climbs up the hillside inland. The surrounding hills reach a height of 2,000 metres. Formerly an administrative centre for the whole of the Kivu region, the town lost some of its status as a result of the growth of Goma and the late 20th century wars that erupted in the Congo following the 1994 Rwandan Genocide.

Following those massacres, Hutu refugees and many members of the former Hutu-led government fled Rwanda, contributing to the Great Lakes refugee crisis. The refugee camps around Goma and Bukavu became a center of Hutu insurgency from the camps against the new Watutsi government of Rwanda.

In November 1996, at the start of the First Congo War, Rwandan government forces attacked the Hutu camps and forces of the Zaire government, which had allowed the insurgency. The Rwandan government supported rebels in Zaire led by Laurent Kabila, who overthrew the Kinshasa government with their help. Later, the Rwandan government fell out with the rebels, which lead to the Second Congo War. Rwanda supported the rebel Rally for Congolese Democracy (RCD) against Kabila. Bukavu and the rest of Sud-Kivu was the site of sporadic fighting between rebels and government forces and their proxies, including the Mayi-Mayi, especially in 1998 and 2004.

On 3 June 2004, protestors in several Congolese cities took to the streets to demonstrate against the United Nations for failing to prevent Bukavu from falling to Rwandan-backed RCD forces led by General Laurent Nkunda. About 16,000 women were raped on a single weekend after Nkunda told his troops "This city is yours for three days." Nkunda was later persuaded to fall in line with the peace accords which ended the war and re-integrate his troops with the Congolese government forces. In September 2007 he rebelled again and started attacking government troops north of Goma.

During the 2015 South Kivu earthquake, at least one policeman was killed.

The city was damaged by the 2022 Bukavu floods.

On 14 February 2025, the city was entered by M23 rebels as part of an ongoing military campaign. The group took full control over the city on 16 February.

On 28 February 2025, an explosion occurred at a rally that killed 13 people and wounded several others. The Congolese government blamed the M23 rebels for the explosions.

== Geography ==
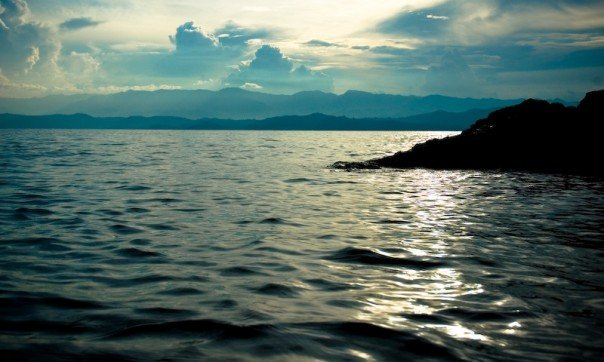
Lake Kivu in Bukavu

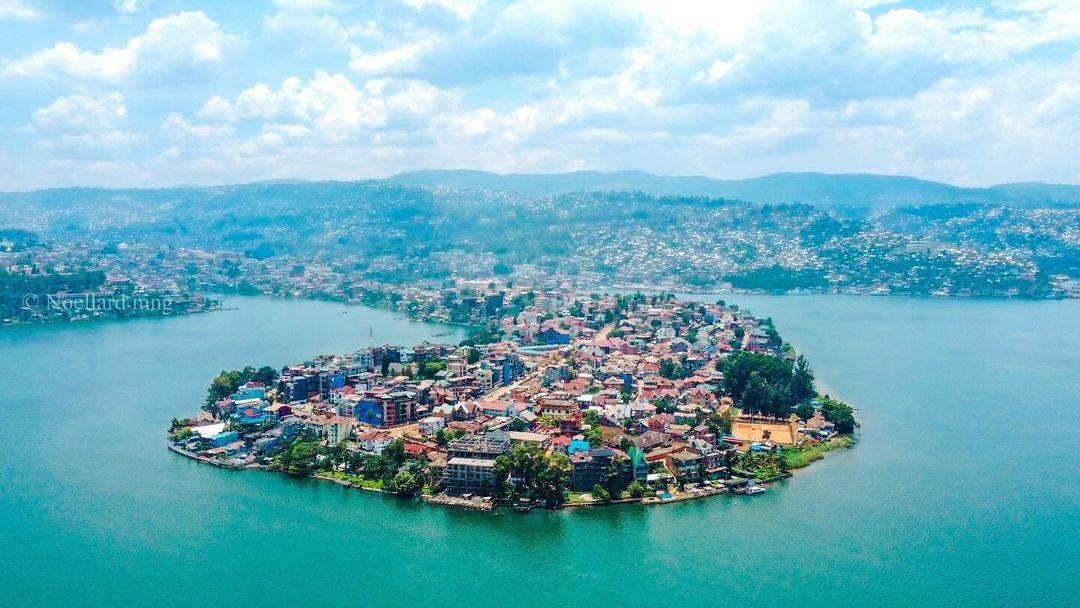
Lake Kivu view

Although not threatened by volcanoes as Goma is, Bukavu is equally in danger from a potential limnic eruption from Lake Kivu, in which vast quantities of dissolved carbon dioxide and methane could explode from the lake and threaten the lives of the 2 million people who live near the lake.

== Climate ==
Köppen-Geiger climate classification system classifies Bukavu's climate as tropical savanna (Aw), although it is milder than most climates of its type due to high altitude. Bukavu sees very warm days and pleasant nights year round.

Climate data for Bukavu (1952–1959)
Month	Jan	Feb	Mar	Apr	May	Jun	Jul	Aug	Sep	Oct	Nov	Dec	Year
Record high °C (°F)	29.0 (84.2)	30.1 (86.2)	29.1 (84.4)	28.5 (83.3)	27.7 (81.9)	28.6 (83.5)	29.2 (84.6)	31.4 (88.5)	31.8 (89.2)	30.2 (86.4)	28.7 (83.7)	28.4 (83.1)	31.8 (89.2)
Mean daily maximum °C (°F)	25.4 (77.7)	25.3 (77.5)	25.3 (77.5)	24.9 (76.8)	24.9 (76.8)	25.4 (77.7)	26.1 (79.0)	27.1 (80.8)	26.5 (79.7)	25.4 (77.7)	24.8 (76.6)	24.7 (76.5)	25.5 (77.9)
Daily mean °C (°F)	20.4 (68.7)	20.4 (68.7)	20.4 (68.7)	20.2 (68.4)	20.3 (68.5)	20.1 (68.2)	20.0 (68.0)	20.9 (69.6)	21.0 (69.8)	20.5 (68.9)	20.1 (68.2)	20.4 (68.7)	20.4 (68.7)
Mean daily minimum °C (°F)	15.4 (59.7)	15.4 (59.7)	15.4 (59.7)	15.6 (60.1)	15.7 (60.3)	14.8 (58.6)	13.8 (56.8)	14.7 (58.5)	15.4 (59.7)	15.6 (60.1)	15.4 (59.7)	15.4 (59.7)	15.2 (59.4)
Record low °C (°F)	12.4 (54.3)	13.2 (55.8)	12.7 (54.9)	12.7 (54.9)	13.2 (55.8)	13.2 (55.8)	12.4 (54.3)	10.7 (51.3)	12.2 (54.0)	13.3 (55.9)	13.2 (55.8)	13.1 (55.6)	10.7 (51.3)
Average precipitation mm (inches)	118 (4.6)	132 (5.2)	183 (7.2)	148 (5.8)	74 (2.9)	20 (0.8)	13 (0.5)	56 (2.2)	103 (4.1)	144 (5.7)	179 (7.0)	147 (5.8)	1,317 (51.8)
Average precipitation days (≥ 0.1 mm)	20	19	24	24	14	5	3	4	14	19	24	23	193
Average relative humidity (%)	83	84	85	86	86	81	75	68	74	80	83	84	81
Mean monthly sunshine hours	151.9	135.6	148.8	147.0	161.2	216.0	241.8	223.2	180.0	155.0	135.0	130.2	2,025.7
Percentage possible sunshine	40	40	40	41	44	61	66	60	50	41	37	35	46
Source: DWD

== Architecture ==
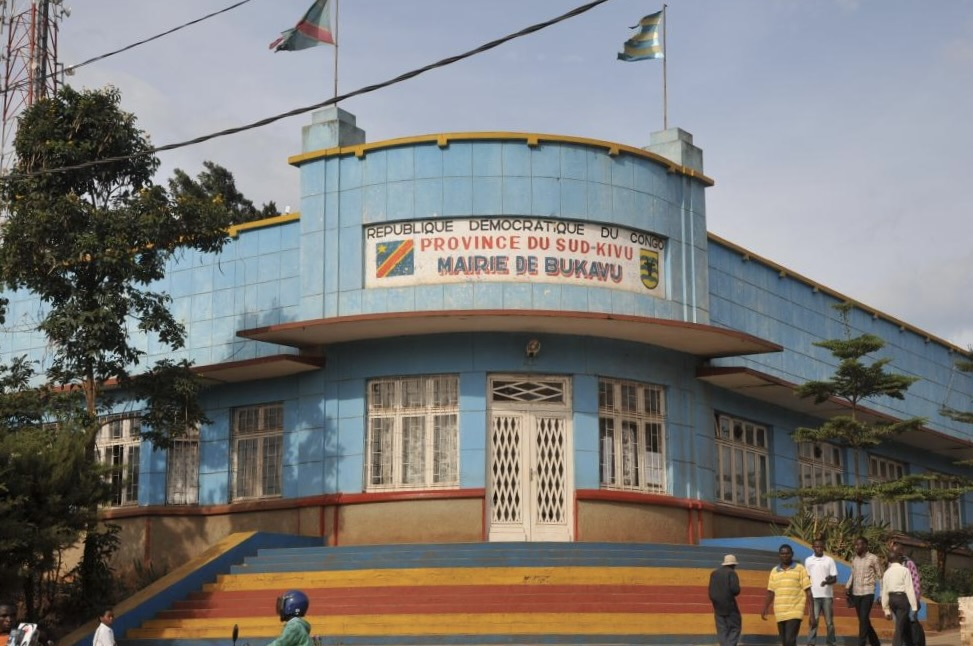
City hall, an art deco building, in 2013

The city has over 100 art deco buildings which were constructed during Belgian colonial rule and proposals have been made to preserve these so that the city can be a tourist attraction for architecture enthusiasts.

== Transport ==
Bukavu is an important transport hub and gateway to eastern DR Congo, but as a result of the wars the road network has deteriorated and highways to Goma, Kisangani and other towns have not been fully restored. As with Goma, close proximity to the paved road network of East Africa and the functioning eastern section of the Trans-African Highway to Mombasa may allow a faster recovery than other Congolese towns. Bukavu's proximity to the Lake Tanganyika ports of Bujumbura and Kalundu-Uvira give it an additional advantage, with access on the lake to the railheads of Kigoma (linked to Dar es Salaam) and Kalemie (rail link to Katanga, in need of rehabilitation). Isolation, largely due to bad road infrastructure, has been found to be an important determinant of wealth and/or development in South Kivu.

Bukavu has numerous lakeside wharves and boat transport is used extensively in the Congolese waters of the lake in the absence of well maintained roads.

Kavumu Airport (ICAO code: FZMA, IATA code: BKY) located about 30 kilometres north is the domestic airport for Bukavu. This airport has not been renovated for many years.

== Education ==
There are many schools and universities present in Bukavu. The city also is known to be one that gives good education in D. R. Congo.

Université Catholique de Bukavu, Université Évangélique en Afrique. The Official University of Bukavu was founded in 1993.

== Parks ==
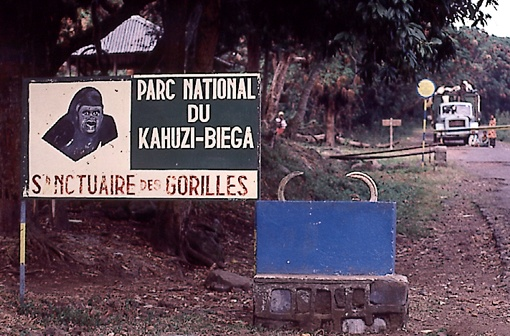
Entrance to Kahuzi-Biéga National Park

Kahuzi-Biéga National Park, a World Heritage Site and one of two homes of the eastern lowland gorilla, is close to the city and can be reached from the road to Kavumu. The park headquarters at Tshivanga is located 31 km from Bukavu.

== Places of worship ==
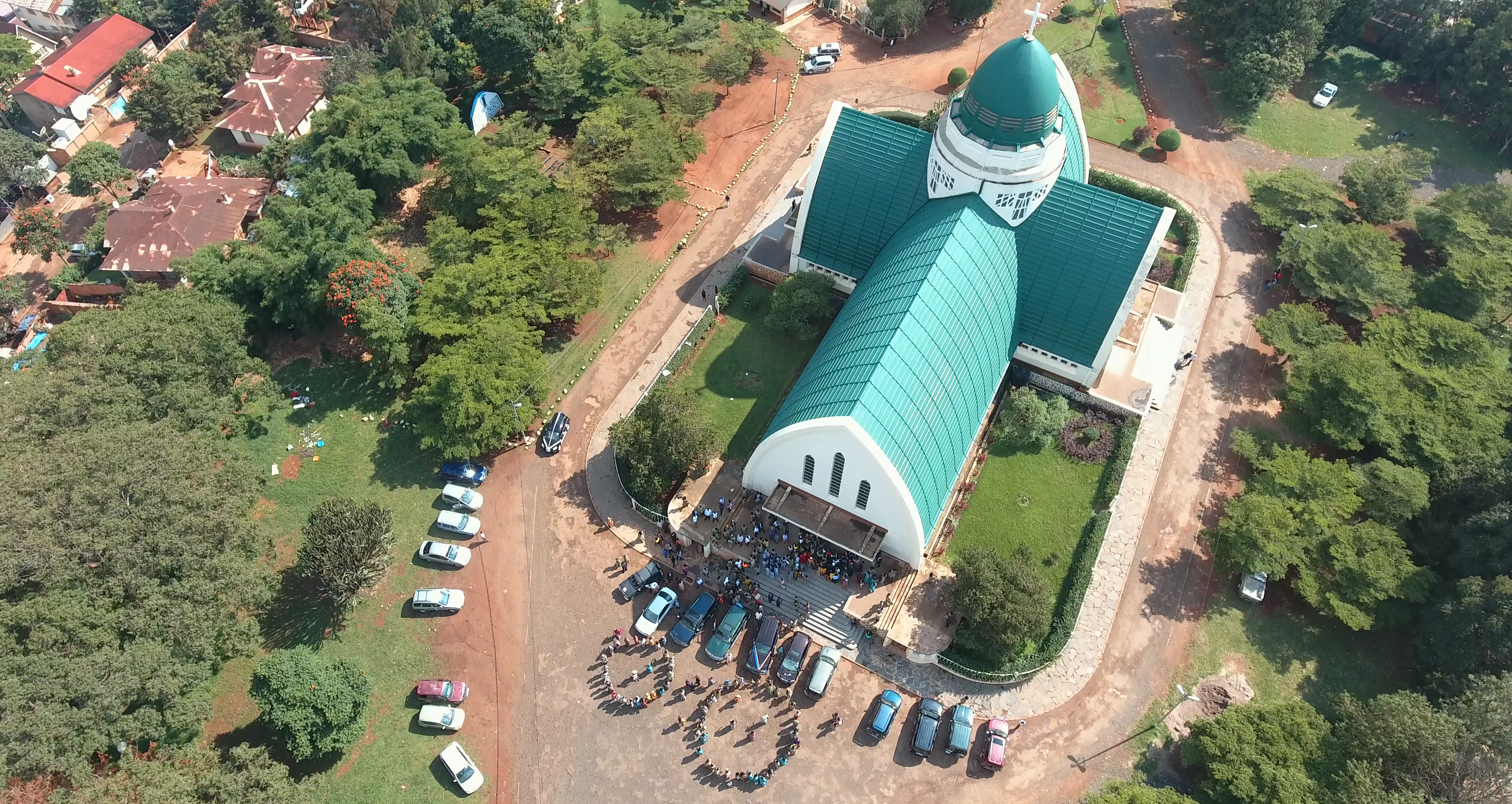
Our Lady of Peace Cathedral in 2017

Among the places of worship, they are predominantly Christian churches and temples: Roman Catholic Archdiocese of Bukavu (Catholic Church), Kimbanguist Church, Baptist Community of Congo (Baptist World Alliance), Baptist Community of the Congo River (Baptist World Alliance), Assemblies of God, Province of the Anglican Church of the Congo (Anglican Communion), Presbyterian Community in Congo (World Communion of Reformed Churches). The city also counts a few mosques.

== Medical care ==
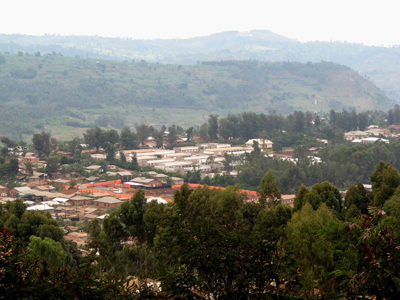
Panzi Hospital

The city is home to the Panzi Hospital. Founded by the Swedish Pentecostal Mission in 1921, its director Denis Mukwege operates on women who survive sexual violence, and is one of two doctors in the eastern Congo qualified to perform a reconstructive surgery.

Panzi Hospital is a teaching hospital of the Evangelical University in Africa. Bukavu is also home to the Catholic University of Bukavu's School of Medicine and General Reference teaching hospital. The pharmaceutical factory Pharmakina owned by a German immigrant and a French immigrant produces the antimalarial drug quinine and the generic AIDS medicament Afri-vir. Pharmakina also runs an AIDS diagnostic and treatment center. With 740 employees and about 1000 free-lance workers. After Great Lake Plantations SARL, which is Congo's only modern tea manufacturing company, Pharmakina is the largest employer in town.

== Social issues ==
Women continue to face major problems of violence in the wake of war in the eastern DRC. Fondation Chirezi in August 2007 launched a project based in Bukavu for women's trauma healing and care.

Another NGO launched a program to help women affected by Violence in Panzi next to Fondation Panzi called V-Day.

After the repeated wars in the east of the Democratic Republic of Congo, the number of people wounded by the war and living with disabilities has increased considerably. A national non-profit association called Congo Handicap was created in 2004 in Bukavu to support people living with disabilities. It provides comprehensive care for this segment of the population, including people living with disabilities who were raped during the war.

== Notable residents ==
- Caddy Adzuba
- Cor Akim
- Alexis Brimeyer
- Jean-Marie Bulambo Kilosho
- Marcellin Cishambo
- Amini Cishugi
- Vital Kamerhe
- Jeannette Kavira Mapera
- Solange Lusiku Nsimire
- Solange Lwashiga Furaha
- Yolande Mabika
- Saïd Makasi
- Léon Mamboleo
- François-Xavier Maroy
- Popole Misenga
- Louis Muderhwa
- Denis Mukwege
- Francine Muyumba
- Douce Namwezi N'Ibamba
- Mwezé Ngangura
- Kakengwa Pikinini
- Raoul Shungu
- Stephanos of Tallinn
- Jean van de Velde (director)
- Topistar Di Congo
- Claude Bizibuye Nyamugabo
