= Mystery Flesh Pit National Park =

Fictional location and internet project

- Created by: Trevor Roberts
- Genre: Speculative evolution, alternate history, décollage, cosmic horror

In-universe information
- Other name: Permian Basin Superorganism Immanis Colosseus (scientific name)
- Type: National park; Roadside attraction (formerly)
- Location: Texas, United States

The Mystery Flesh Pit National Park is an ongoing science fiction/horror project by artist Trevor Roberts that blends multimedia illustrations, writings and immersive world building. The story revolves around the fictional Mystery Flesh Pit, a colossal, ancient superorganism discovered beneath the town of Gumption, Texas, during an oil excavation. The pit was then transformed into a tourism destination and harvested for raw materials, until a catastrophic disaster in 2007 forced its closure. The project is a satire of corporate greed: the disaster which closed the park occurred due to cost-cutting on vital safety features, and ultimately the bigger hubris was building a theme park inside the superorganism in the first place even though it was never fully explored or understood.

== Development ==
Trevor Roberts is an architect, a career which developed his taste in art. In 2019, while in the break room of an architecture firm, the idea for the project began when he photographed a rotting cantaloupe. After editing this into a photo of an open mine in South Africa, the result reminded him of a Works Progress Administration (WPA) National Park poster. Roberts posted his work to a subreddit, where it was well received, and he began to build a story around the image, which developed into the Mystery Flesh Pit National Park.

== Format and multimedia elements ==
Roberts has since posted fictional letters, diagrams, posters, and advertisements that emulate the style of National Park Service publications. The artworks are in a realistic style, which plays into the grotesque nature of a living superorganism being utilized as a national park.

The park operated for about thirty years before being shut down due to the events of the Fourth of July in 2007. During the evening celebrations, unseasonably rainy weather and an electrical fault caused the Permian Basin Superorganism to choke and 'swallow' the structures inside the park; subsequent attempts to subdue the Superorganism caused it to vomit. The incident was said to have taken the lives of over 750 people.

== Features of the Pit ==
=== Permian Basin Superorganism ===
The "flesh pit" is officially referred to as the "Permian Basin Superorganism" or "PBS" (scientific name Immanis colosseus). It is an ancient, vaguely echinoderm-like underground superorganism of such colossal size that it is measured on a geological scale. While the entrance is located near the town of Gumption, its biomass spans multiple counties in West Texas. Expeditions have only mapped it out to at least 100 to 150 kilometers in width and at least 20 kilometers in depth, but this may only be a fraction of its full extent. While it is dormant, perhaps in some form of hibernation, its biological processes are still very much active.

The age and origins of the superorganism are unknown. Geological evidence indicates it has been in its current location for at least several hundred thousand years, and possibly millions of years. Some speculate that it might be extraterrestrial in origin, but the evidence is contradictory. Space probes have discovered what might be massive fossils of similar organisms on the planet Venus, but it is unknown whether the species originated on other planets or perhaps originated on Earth and thereafter spread to other planets. It is biochemically compatible with terrestrial organisms.

There is widespread scientific speculation that it was aquatic in origin or at least spent a great deal of time in the ocean, given the large number of prehistoric seashells in its digestive tract and the presence of numerous endosymbionts and parasites that reside within its body which are descended from aquatic ancestors.

=== Internal ecosystem ===
The Permian Basin Superorganism is so large and has lived for so long that a unique ecosystem of troglobitic creatures has evolved within it, having been cut off from the rest of the world. The majority of the park's fauna include bizarre variations on familiar organisms such as arthropods, echinoderms, molluscs, cnidarians, worms, leading to speculation that the PBS was originally located in an aquatic environment. A few vertebrate species have wandered into the superorganism over the eons, one of the most notable examples of which is the "Amorphous Shame"—descended from common weasels, they became so dependent on parasitism of the superorganism's blood that almost all of their bodily features atrophied, leaving them little more than a sessile blob of organs (vaguely similar to liver flukes). Several creatures within the cave-like ecosystem can grow to massive size, such as the Abyssal Copepod, a 20 foot long, 300 pound crustacean with unusually human-shaped hands. Increasingly more bizarre fauna in the depths of the pit defy current scientific understanding.

=== Amalgamations ===
One of the most drastic properties of the Permian Basin Superorganism is that living creatures trapped within it will at times become horrifically fused together. This process is poorly understood, but involves accidental exposure to regenerative healing enzymes stored inside the PBS. Officially known as "Compound Surface Fauna", though commonly called "amalgamations", these mismatched masses of limbs can be made up of two or three, or in some cases several dozen, unfortunate creatures fused together. During the years the Mystery Flesh Pit National Park was active, multiple incidents of human amalgamations occurred, yet the park remained open to the public. The park made some experiments to surgically separate human amalgamations and keep victims on life-support, but this was largely for public relations and was later abandoned for not being cost-effective.

It is speculated that several of the unusual species within the PBS ecosystem may have originated as amalgamations which were biologically stable enough to live on their own.

=== National park ===
The "Mystery Flesh Pit National Park" was created within the superorganism by the Anodyne corporation, treating the living creature much like a natural cave system to attract tourists and adventure-seekers. Several "geo-biological" structures became popular hiking destinations during the park's existence, examples of which include the bronchial forests (the lungs) which housed primitive trails, the gastric seas (digestive tract) both gastric seas (lesser gastric sea & greater gastric sea housed its set of destinations. Inside the lesser gastric sea there was the gastric ferry terminal & Fredrick J. Agnich memorial dam while the greater gastric sea had the Intrapark Thermal Wellness Resort, the throat which housed the lower visitor center, a mall that connected to all of the main trailheads, and the "ballast pods", which contained a potent aphrodisiac and were operated by the park as hot springs).

== Reception and impact ==
A tabletop RPG has been developed in a partnership with Ganza Gaming. A book is also currently being created by Roberts. Once the book is published, which is set to contain expanded lore and art, Roberts says he will be done with the project. A video game based on Mystery Flesh Pit was in development, but the project was scrapped for numerous reasons, including fan feedback and creative differences.

== See also ==
- Constructed world
- Analog horror
- Roadside attraction – An influence on the aesthetic of the project
- Speculative evolution
