= Uvira =

City in South Kivu, DR Congo

Uvira Mji wa Uvira (Swahili)
- Ville d'Uvira
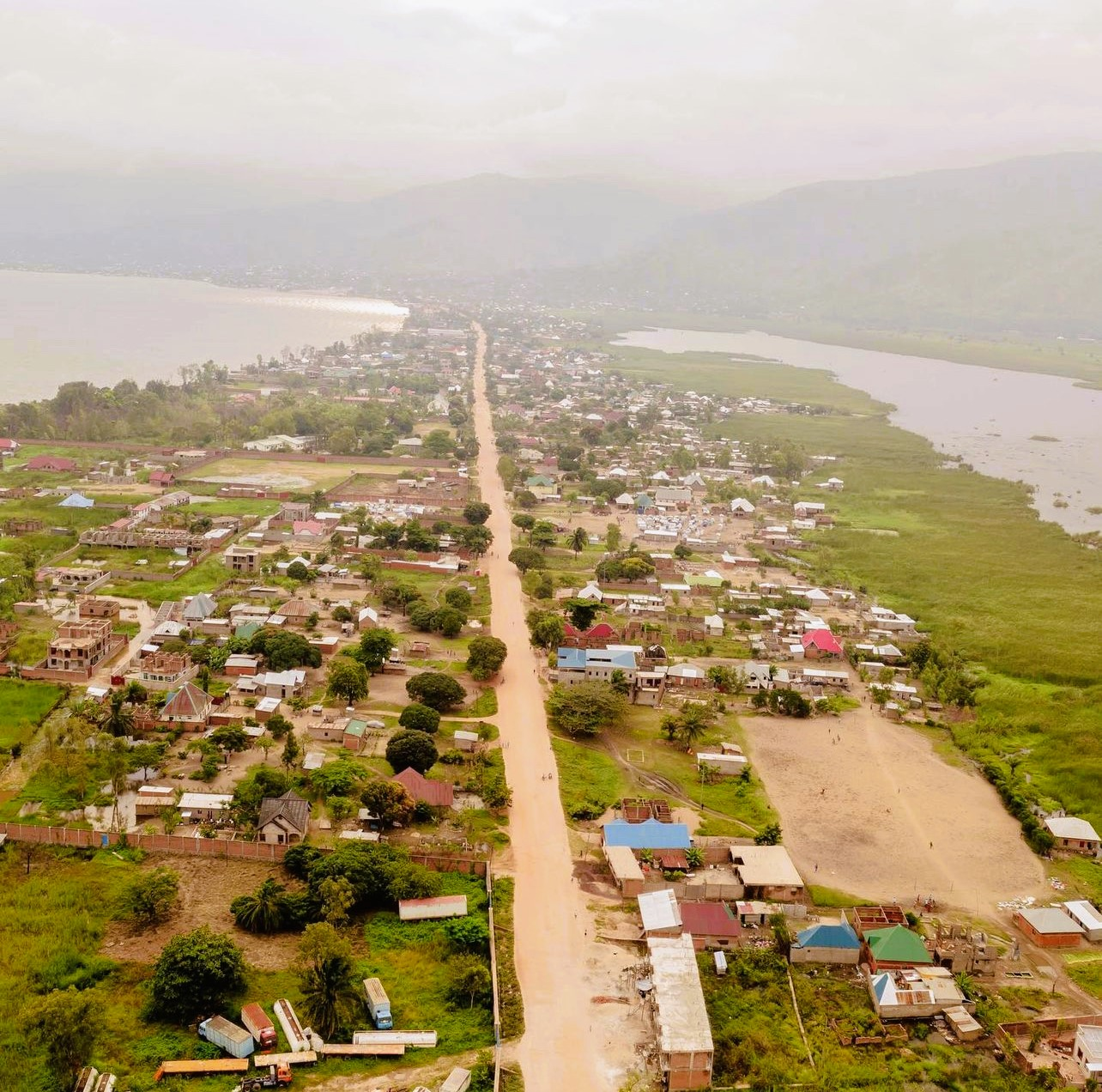

- Location within Democratic Republic of the Congo
- Coordinates: 3°22′12″S 29°08′24″E
- Country: Democratic Republic of the Congo
- Province: South Kivu
- Communes: Kalundu, Mulongwe, Kagando

Government
  - Mayor: Kiza Muhato
  - Interim mayor: Kifara Kapenda Kyk'y

Area
  - City: 207 km^{2} (80 sq mi)
- Elevation: 746 m (2,448 ft)

Population (2024 estimate)
  - Urban: 726,000

Uvira is a city in the South Kivu province of the eastern region of the Democratic Republic of the Congo. Covering approximately 207 square kilometers and with an estimated population of 726,000 as of 2024, it borders Bafuliru Chiefdom and Ruzizi Plain Chiefdom to the north, Bavira Chiefdom to the south, and Lake Tanganyika and the Ruzizi River to the east. These rivers form natural boundaries between the DRC and Burundi. Located in the Ruzizi Plain at a low altitude, the city lies between Burundi's Congo-Nile ridge and the Mitumba mountains.

Uvira is the central hub of the surrounding Uvira Territory, with an economy anchored in trade, fishing, agriculture, and livestock farming, while the port of Kalundu provides regional transport routes across Lake Tanganyika, connecting the city with Kalemie, Kigoma, Mpulungu, and Bujumbura. The city is also an important religious center and served as the episcopal seat of the Roman Catholic Diocese of Uvira, which is a suffragan of the Archdiocese of Bukavu.

Uvira has historically been shaped by waves of migration, Arab-Swahili commercial expansion, and Belgian colonial administration. From the early 1900s, it became a strategic garrison of the Congo Free State, serving as a northernmost entry point from the Indian Ocean via Lake Tanganyika and a base for monitoring German East Africa positions in Ruanda-Urundi and Tanzania mainland. It hosted up to 1,800 troops under Inspector Paul Costermans and became the site of a war council on 17 October 1900, which established the Ruzizi-Kivu Territory with Uvira as its headquarters. By a ministerial decree of 11 September 1911, Uvira became the seat of the Kivu Zone of the Stanleyville District; when Kivu was elevated to district status on 3 November 1913, Uvira briefly served as the district capital until the seat was moved to Rutshuru in 1914. It later gained city status through a presidential decree in 2018, making it the second officially recognized city in South Kivu after Bukavu. The city is divided into three communes: Kalundu, Mulongwe, and Kagando. Its population is ethnically diverse, with the Fuliiru forming the largest group, followed by the Vira and Bembe. Uvira and its surrounding areas have experienced conflict and repeated population displacement for nearly four decades.

== Etymology ==
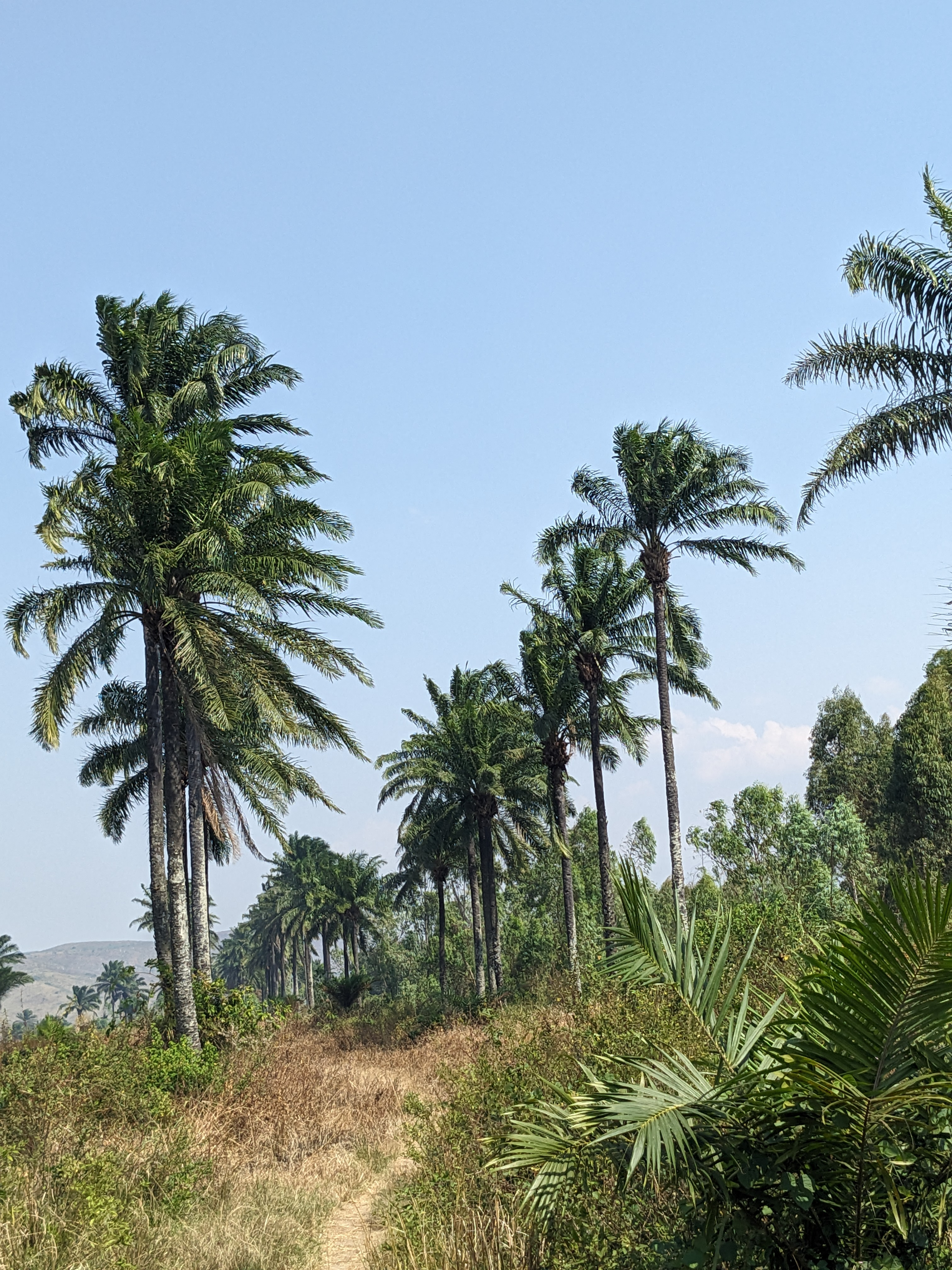
Oil palm trees in Uvira

Uvira was originally called Masanze, while the origin of its current name remains uncertain. Although some sources link the name to the Vira people, Congolese historian Jacques Depelchin instead suggests that the ethnonym Vira derives from the geographical name Uvira. He argues that Arab-Swahili traders introduced the name Uvira to refer to areas locally known as Nyamianda or Kabungulu. Depelchin also rejects the claim by some colonial administrators that Uvira derived from kivira, meaning "palm tree". He regards this explanation as symbolic or mythological rather than historical, although he acknowledges that local inhabitants may later have associated the name with palm trees because Arab-Swahili traders systematically planted palms in the region.

== Geography ==
Uvira is located at the northernmost tip of Lake Tanganyika. To the north are Kavimvira's hot springs and the Nyangara marshlands; to the south lies the Ruzizi River, forming a natural border with the Kalungwe groupement of the Bavira Chiefdom. Lake Tanganyika and Burundi border it to the east, while the Mitumba mountains rise to the west. Kalundu, a lake port located at the southern end of the city, serves as a connection point for boats heading to Kalemie in the Tanganyika province, Kigoma in Tanzania, Mpulungu in Zambia, and Bujumbura in Burundi. Located approximately 120 km from the provincial capital Bukavu, Uvira is accessible by road from Bukavu and Bujumbura and is 60 km from Fizi Territory. Lake Tanganyika supports thriving fishing and transportation industries.

=== Hydrology ===
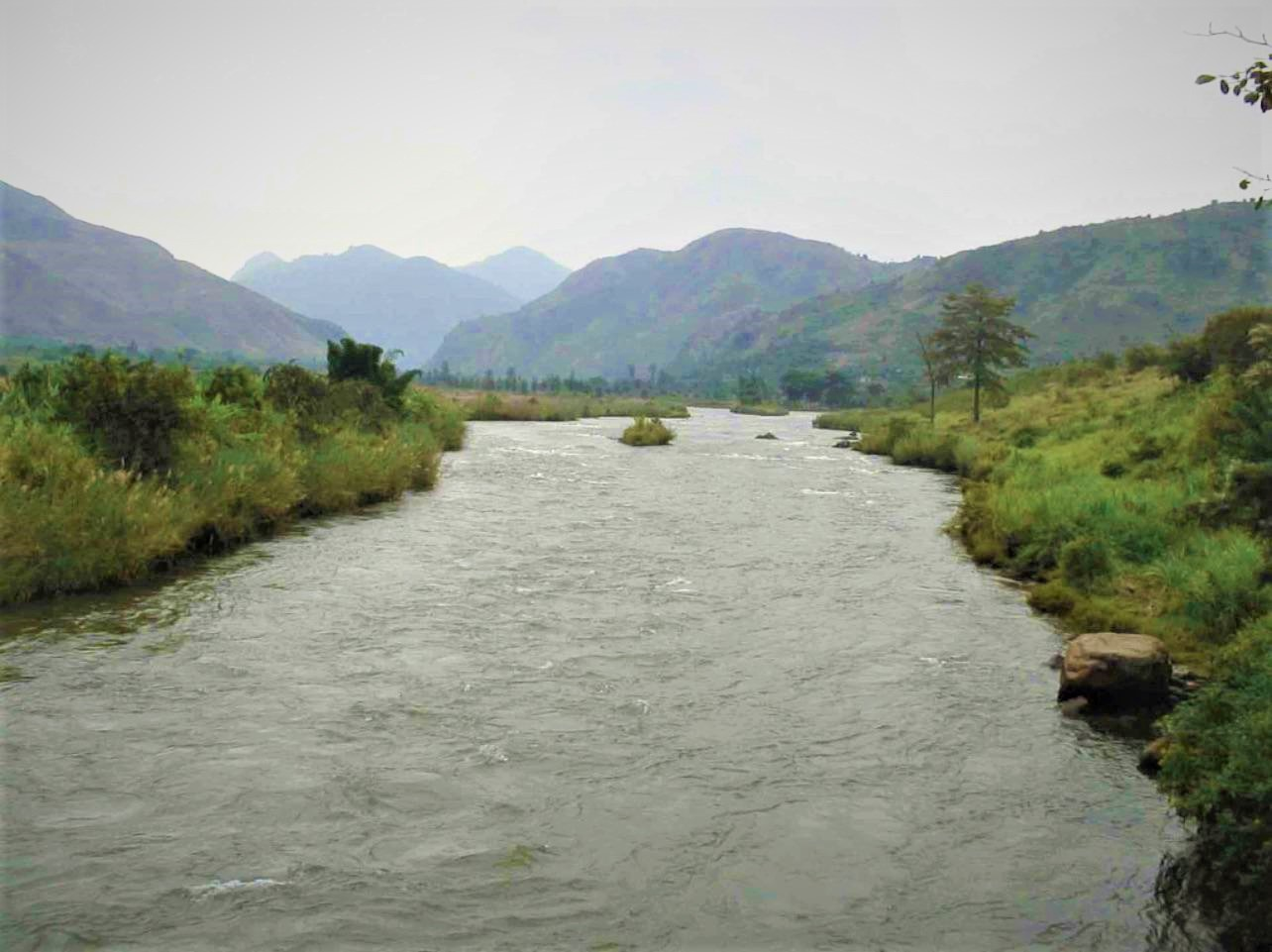
Ruzizi River

Uvira is characterized by the presence of several rivers and is rich in streams. The city is dominated by Lake Tanganyika, which borders it from the northeast and southeast. From the west, Uvira is crossed by various rivers, namely the Kamberulu River, Ruzizi River, Kakungwe River, Kibinda River, Kamanyola River, Kalimabenge River, Mulongwe River, and Kanvinvira River. The presence of Lake Tanganyika significantly influences the climate and weather patterns in the region, as large bodies of water have an impact on local temperatures and precipitation.

=== Vegetation ===
Uvira is home to marshlands and hydric meadows, dominated by macrophytes such as reeds that flourish in hydrosaturated environments. Grass-dominated savannas, serving as vital pastoral and agronomic reserves, are dominated by Imperata cylindrica, Hyparrhenia spp., Eragrostis spp., Urochloa eminii (Brachiaria ruziziensis or Congo grass), and Pennisetum spp. Scattered with Acacia kirkii in some wooded zones, these savannas are valuable for their forage and timber.

Drought-adapted xerophilous groves host species resilient to the arid microclimates of the region, while fragmented relics of forested areas persist as ecological vestiges in transitional zones. Extensive deforestation, exacerbated by conflict-induced socio-economic strain, has significantly depleted these once-prominent forests.

=== Geology and climate ===
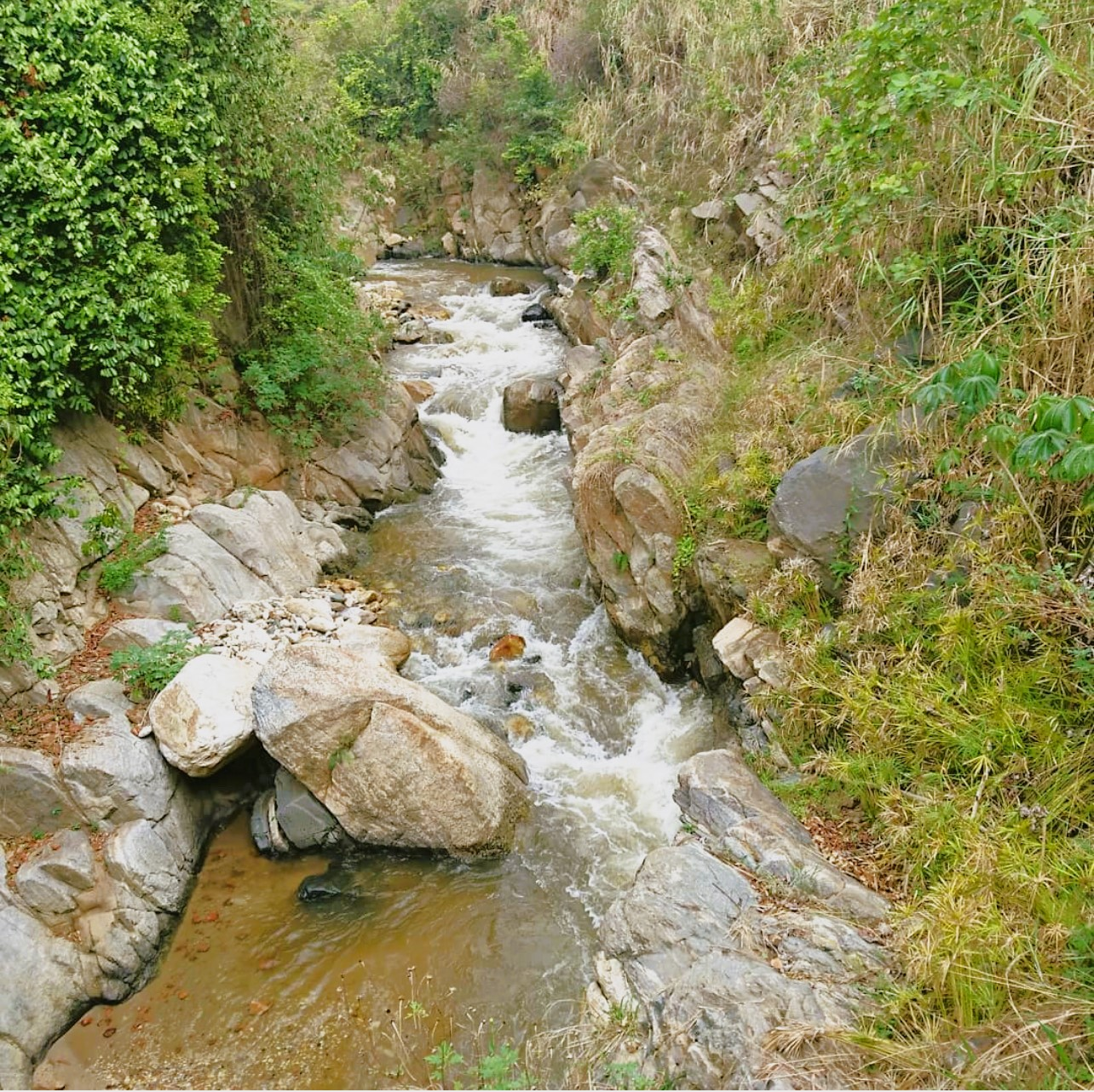
Mulongwe River

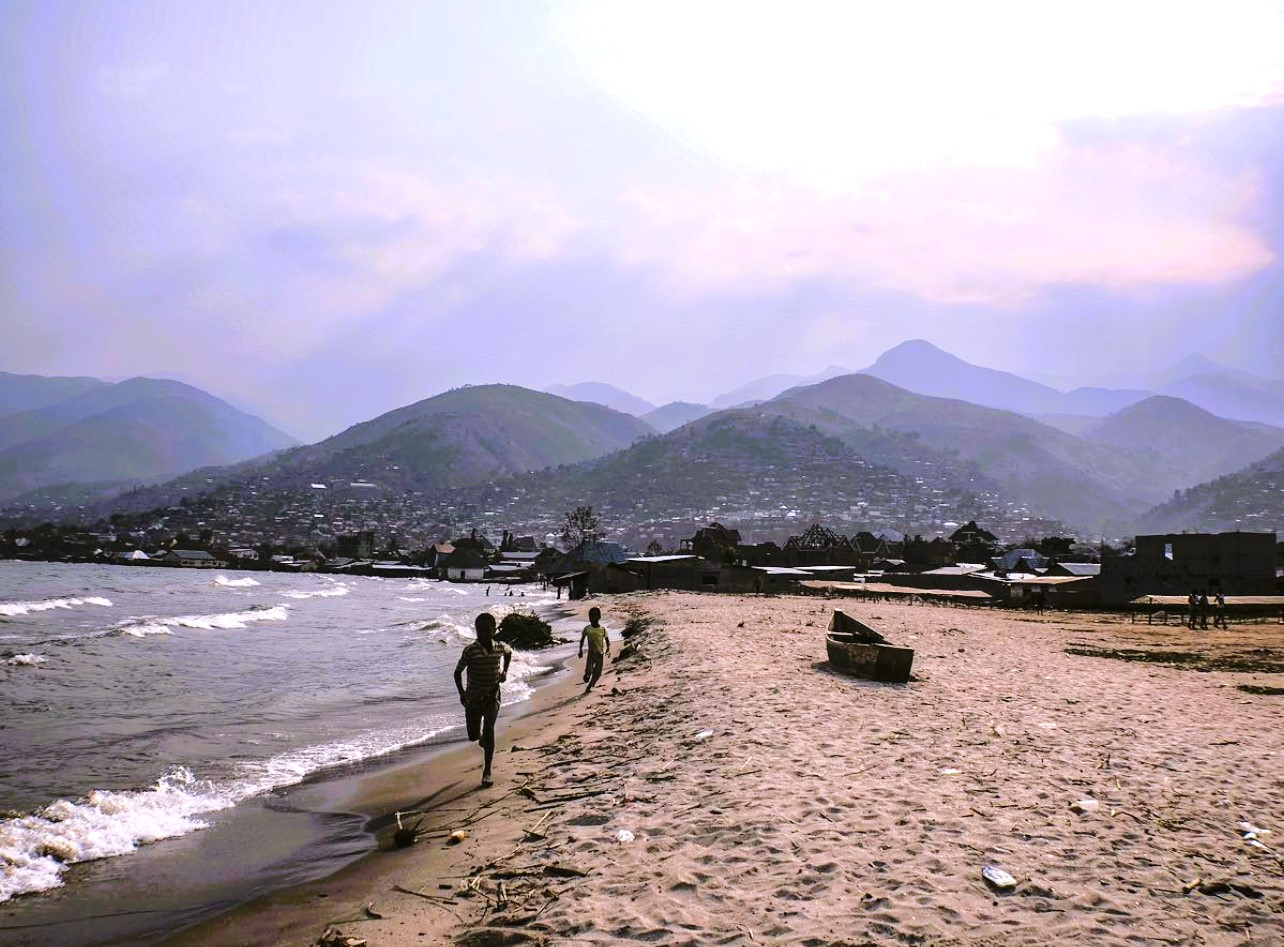
Lake Tanganyika in Uvira

Uvira lies geologically within the Ruzizi Plain, an integral part of the East African Rift's western branch, specifically within the Albertine Rift, a sub-region of the Great Rift Valley. This tectonically active region is characterized by a staircase-like formation of horsts and graben, along with faulting and volcanic activity. Uvira's geological substratum is composed of ancient Precambrian rock formations, such as gneisses, quartzites, and granites, as well as more recent Quaternary alluvial deposits. These formations have produced a diverse array of soil types, from clay-rich soils in hilly areas to sandy alluvium in the valley floor.

The city experiences a tropical climate with a clear division between wet and dry seasons. The wet season in Uvira typically occurs from January to mid-May and from mid-September to December, and a dry season spanning from June to September. Temperature variations align with the seasons and elevation, with lower temperatures in the high plateau (15° to 25°C) and moderate temperatures (20° to 30°C) in the Ruzizi Plain during the dry season.

=== Administrative history and divisions ===
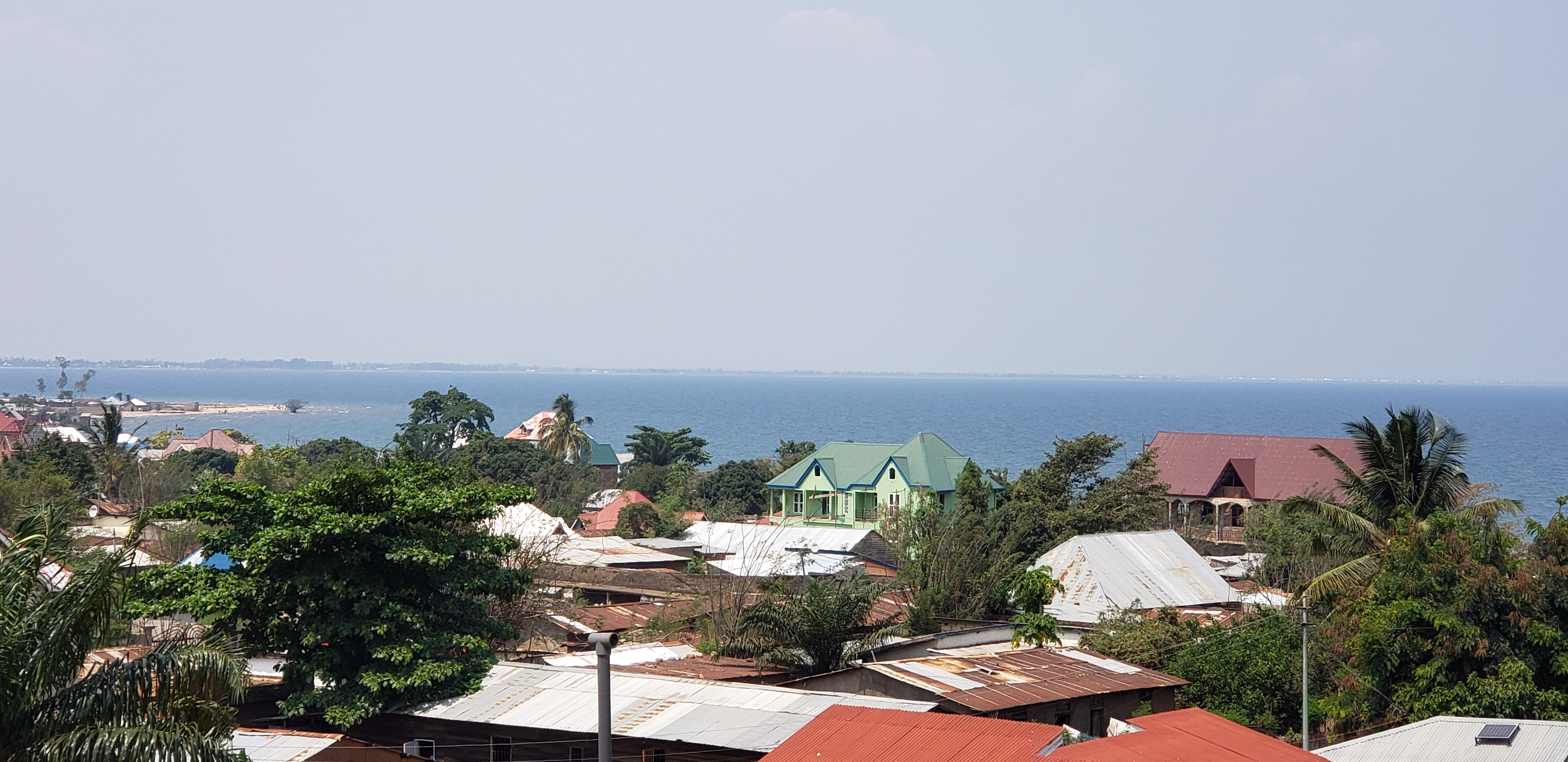
Houses in Uvira situated near Lake Tanganyika

Uvira's administrative framework is rooted in its historical development since 1911, which is molded by its strategic role. Initially attached to the Stanley Falls District, Kivu was reorganized in 1900 into the Territory of Ruzizi-Kivu (Territoire de Ruzizi-Kivu), and it extended from the Kamanyola to the Kihimbi River, with Uvira as its administrative center. On 17 October 1900, a war council was established at Uvira, dividing the territory into two administrative zones: Rutshuru–Beni and Uvira. By 1904, the Uvira zone comprised six sectors: Uvira, Luvungi, Baraka, Kalembelembe, Bobandana, and Nyalukemba (modern Bukavu).

A ministerial decree of 11 September 1911 redefined Kivu as a dependency of the Stanleyville District of Orientale Province. Uvira remained the administrative headquarters, but the territory was divided into three new sectors: Tanganyika (capital Uvira), Lake Edward (capital Beni), and Rutshuru. On 3 November 1913, Kivu was elevated to district rank within Orientale Province. At that time, the district comprised eight territories: Semliki (capital: Beni), "Kilofu" (capital: Masisi), Kivu (capital: Nyalukemba), Tanganyika (capital: Uvira), as well as Luofu, Rutshuru, Kwidjwi (Idjwi), and Kalembelembe. Before this, the decree of 2 May 1910 had consolidated Belgian control by formalizing the system of chefferies (chiefdoms). It created a dual judicial system, with one for the colonized and another for the colonizers. Chiefs and sub-chiefs retained authority only insofar as their rulings conformed to colonial regulations. While framed as preserving "customary law", the system turned chiefs into intermediaries of colonial power, responsible for tax collection, labor recruitment, and land redistribution. In practice, it created an institutional buffer between rulers and ruled. In 1914, the capital was transferred from Uvira to Rutshuru.

Uvira's administrative structure was refined on 18 August 1928 with the establishment of Uvira Territory, organized into three chiefdoms: Bafuliru, Bavira, and Barundi (Ruzizi Plain). Ordinance-Law No. 21/91, issued on 25 February 1938, defined Uvira Territory's boundaries and administrative structure, which included three chiefdoms (Bafuliiru, Bavira, and the Ruzizi Plain), three urban centers (Uvira, Kiliba, and Sange), and three administrative posts (Makobola, Luvungi, and Mulenge). This administrative configuration remained unaltered by Order No. 67-221, issued on 3 May 1967.

In recognition of its growing population and economic significance, a 2013 Prime Ministerial decree granted city status to Uvira. Leading up to the 2018 general elections, the government reaffirmed this designation. On 27 December 2018, President Joseph Kabila formalized Uvira's city status through a presidential decree, which was further strengthened by Decree No. 13/029 on 13 June 2019. This decree conferred city and municipal status to various agglomerations in South Kivu, making Uvira the province's second city after Bukavu. Kiza Muhato, a noted civil society figure, was appointed as mayor, with Kifara Kapenda Kiki serving as the deputy mayor.

The city consists of three communes:

- Kalundu
- Mulongwe
- Kagando

These communes are divided into 14 quartiers (neighborhoods). The 2014 civil status statistics for Uvira's quartiers:

Neighborhoods (quartiers)
1.	Kabindula
2.	Kakombe
3.	Kalundu
4.	Kasenga
5.	Kavimvira
6.	Kibondwe
7.	Kilibula
8.	Kimanga
9.	Mulongwe
10.	Nyamianda
11.	Rombe I
12.	Rombe II
13.	Rugenge
14.	Songo

== History ==
=== Early inhabitants and ethnic formation ===
Uvira has been inhabited by several different ethnic groups over time. Early accounts by Alfred Moeller de Laddersous mention that the initial inhabitants were the Bazoba, who subsisted mainly on fishing along Lake Tanganyika. They were later supplanted or joined by the Banyalenge (or Benelenge), who derived their name from their chief Lenghe (or Lenge), likely a 17th-century migrant from Maniema. In the course of time, the Banyalenge became known as the Bavira and grew to be the main ruling clan of the local ethnic group.

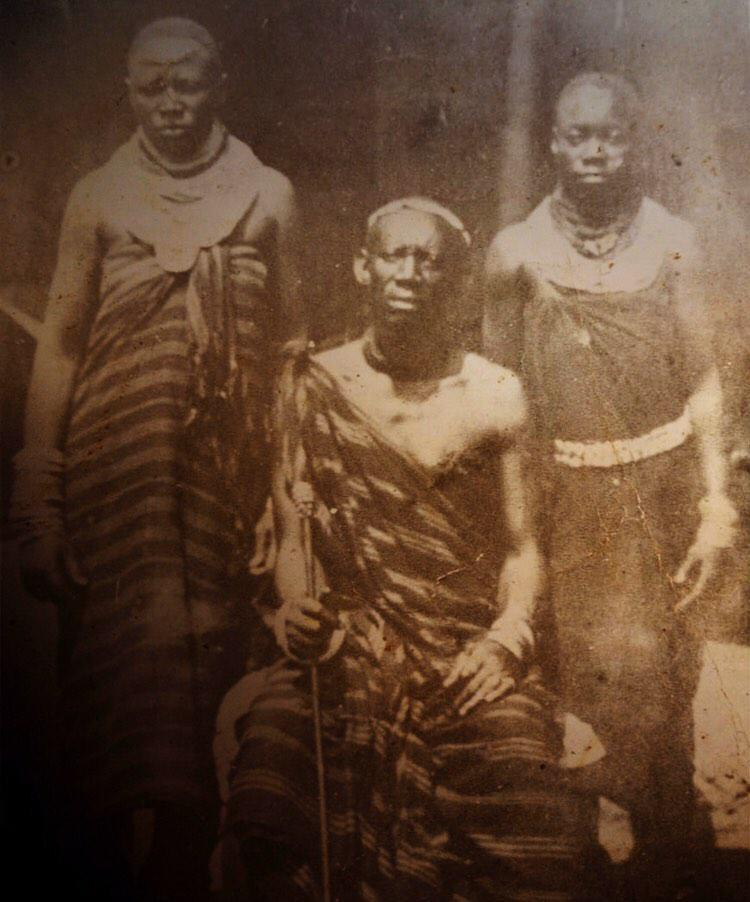
Mwami Nyamugira Mukogabwe II of Bafuliiru Chiefdom in Lemera, Belgian Congo, circa 1925

However, alternate historical accounts compiled by early European observers suggest that the entirety of the Uvira Territory, along with adjacent stretches of the western lakeshore extending northwards to Luvungi, was traditionally under the control of the Bahamba dynasty of the Fuliiru people. This dynasty was centered in Lemera, located in the northwestern portion of the Ruzizi Plain. Congolese historian Shimbi Kamba Katchelewa, cited in Charles Katembo Kakozi's 2005 study Facteurs socio-politiques explicatifs des conflits dans la région des Grands Lacs Africains: Étude du cas d'Uvira en RDC, suggests that the earliest Fuliiru settlers originated from Lwindi (present-day Lwindi Chiefdom) and established key settlements in Mulenge, Luvungi, and Lemera between the 10th and 14th centuries. These foundational communities laid the groundwork for the emergence of what became known as the "Hamba Kingdom", ruled by the Bahamba clan. Other scholars, including Kingwengwe Mupe and Bosco Muchukiwa Rukakiza, place the migration of the Fuliiru from Lwindi at a later date, around the 17th century.

Historian Bishikwabo Chubaka notes that during the initial settlement period, the region of Fuliiru was sparsely populated, and new groups were able to settle as long as they acknowledged the authority of Bahamba's mwami. The mwami's authority, however, was largely symbolic and most influential in areas near the royal court. Distant local chiefs often paid allegiance without significant subordination. One such subordinate, Lenghe, recognized as a subject of the mwami of Lwindi and considered an ancestral figure by many ruling Bavira dynasties, migrated to the northwestern coast of Lake Tanganyika. According to Bavira oral traditions, Lenghe settled in the area after pursuing a buffalo from Lwindi to Kabungulu, where he killed it. Attracted by the abundance of game, he chose to remain and requested additional followers from Chief Nalwindi, who sent experienced hunters from villages such as Muhinga, Nabaganda, Nakwinga, and Nyakabaka. After their arrival, this group acknowledged the authority of mwami Lwamwe Lwe Mbakwe, the third ruler of the Bahamba dynasty, who encouraged their settlement as a means of consolidating and expanding his realm. Over time, however, Lenghe and his followers developed distinct socio-economic practices, and in contrast to the primarily agrarian and pastoral Fuliiru of the interior, Lenghe's group assimilated fishing techniques from the Bazoba and integrated them into their livelihood. This signaled the gradual evolution of the Bavira into a separate polity. Chubaka observes that Lenghe eventually distanced himself from Bahamba authority, and acted independently in political and military affairs, most notably in launching a campaign against the neighboring Bembe, whom he displaced as far as the Sandja River, without prior consultation with his suzerain.

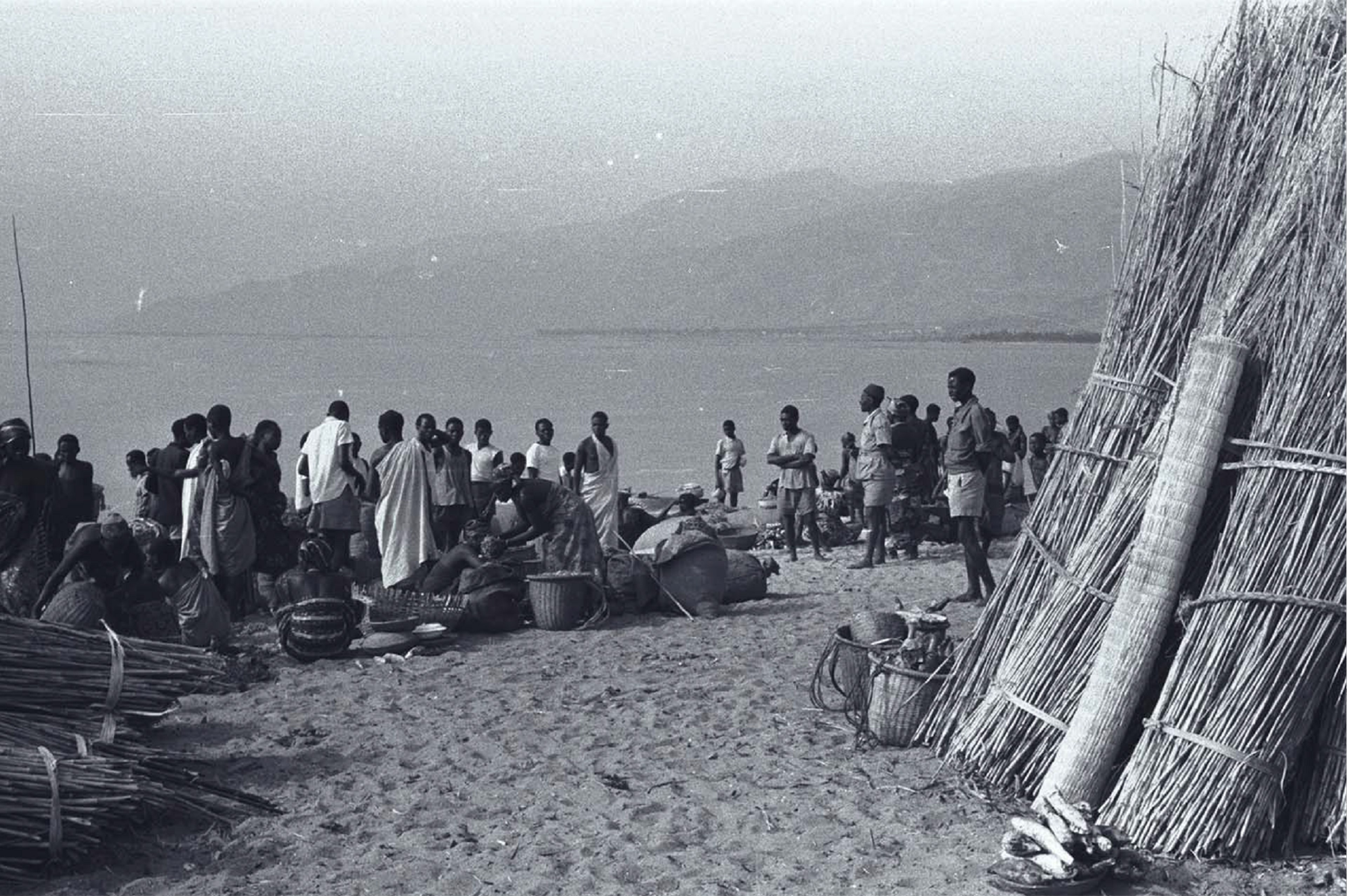
On the shores of Lake Tanganyika: Kilibula march in the Bavira Chiefdom in 1954.

It was within this context of shifting territorial dynamics that a group of Barundi migrants, originating from the left bank of the Ruzizi River, established themselves within "Bavira's Fuliiru territory". According to colonial administrators René Loons and Van der Ghote, this migration occurred around 1800, when a Burundian prince from the Nyakarama lineage, Ndorogwe, settled his people in areas such as Mwihongero near Kiliba, and at Kihebo in the Ruzizi delta, gradually expanding as far north as Sange. Historian Jacques Depelchin notes that many of these migrants were of Hutu ethnicity. Complementary accounts, such as those of E. Simons, a colonial administrator in Burundi, suggest that by approximately 1850, a vassal of the Burundian mwami Ntare II, named Rugendeza and affiliated with the Banyakahama lineage, was active along the shores of Lake Tanganyika and the Ruzizi River. Rugendeza is said to have fled Burundi due to burdensome salt levies imposed by the mwami. Following Rugendeza's death, allegedly by poisoning after openly opposing King Ntare II, his successor, Kinyoni, severed ties with the Burundian monarchy and relocated his community further north into the Ruzizi Plain, eventually settling in Luberizi.

The legal and political legitimacy of the Barundi settlement in Bafuliiru territory remains a subject of historical debate. While Governor Alfred Moeller de Laddersous argued that the Barundi received the land from the Bavira, Belgian ethnographer Georges Weis contended that the land was unoccupied and underutilized due to its swampy conditions. Weis' hypothesis is supported by the fact that these lands were generally avoided by the Bavira and the Bafuliiru, who preferred more arable or elevated terrain. During the mid-19th century, the region was increasingly drawn into the orbit of Arab-Swahili traders and slave raiders. Seeking to undermine existing traditional authority structures, Arab-Swahilis reportedly formed alliances with the Bavira and Barundi to weaken the position of the Fuliiru's mwami. These alliances allowed the Bavira and Barundi to also consolidate their autonomy from the Bahamba dynasty, a process that continued under Lenghe's son and successor, Namuratwa, who significantly expanded his father's domain. He consolidated Bavira's control over the Lake Tanganyika littoral, stretching his influence southward to the Sandja River, northward to Sange, and westward into the highlands separating the area from Bulega. Despite these territorial gains, the Bavira's political and administrative authority remained primarily concentrated along the lakeshore, which would eventually evolve into the urban center of Uvira.

=== Arab-Swahili slave trade ===
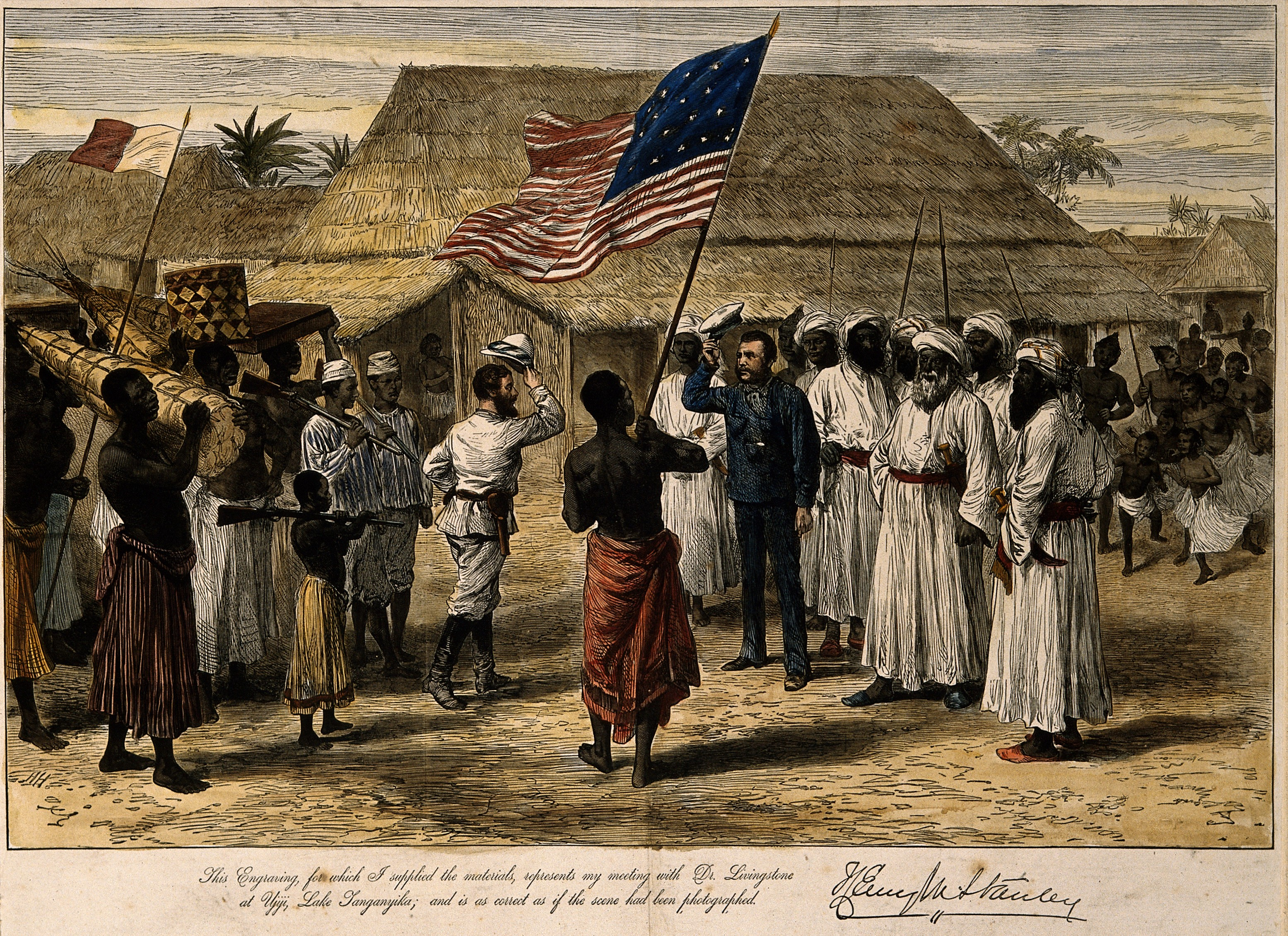
Henry Morton Stanley meets David Livingstone in 1871 at Ujiji, present-day Tanzania, a key hub in the 19th-century East African slave and ivory trade. During this period, early Arab-Swahili raids in the region targeted the Barundi of the Ruzizi Plain and the Bavira, seizing cattle and capturing men who were later sold at Ujiji.

Between the 1840s and 1890s, Burundi's shoreline served as an entrepôt for the slave traffic coming from the eastern part of the Congo Free State. These traders, who were interchangeably known as Bajiji, Ba-Arabu, or Ba-Swahili, worked closely with Muhammad bin Khalfan bin Khamis al-Barwani and his entourage. People locally called them Ba-Maliza, a collective derivation of Khalfan's nickname Ru-maliza, which means "the one who finishes off people". These traders were purveyors of exotic goods and intermediaries in international commerce, while on the other, they were feared as raiders whose activities could destabilize entire communities. In contrast to the more intense slave raids experienced in nearby regions such as Maniema to the west, Uvira did not endure the same scale of violence, but slavery was still prevalent, with Arab-Swahili traders primarily operating as warlords involved in the Indian Ocean slave trade. Early Arab-Swahili raids concentrated on seizing cattle from the Barundi of the Ruzizi Plain and from the Bavira, with men also captured and sold at Ujiji. Oral history suggests that descendants of enslaved Bavira remain in Dar es Salaam today. The bustle of Uvira's market became apparent during Richard Francis Burton's expedition in April 1858. Burton reported being "eagerly received" and met two Arab-Swahili merchants, "Médjib" and "Bakkari", envoys of "Seid-ben-Médjib", an Arab-Swahili merchant of Ujiji. The Bavira remembered this encounter for decades, as in 1933 A. T. Loons recorded that the first three Europeans to arrive in Uvira from Baraka were given nicknames by the locals: one "Kigoma", another "Mukerenge", and the third "Kituba". Musabwa, a Vira leader who later became chief, personally welcomed them on the lakeshore and exchanged gifts, including velvet cloth. Other European explorers reinforced this image with the Austrian explorer Oscar Baumann, who described the Arab-Swahili station at Uvira as "filled with slaves, most of them women and children", some shackled, others roaming. His writings, though, echoed the colonialist rhetoric of his era, which served as an appeal to European governments to intervene before the Congo Free State consolidated control.

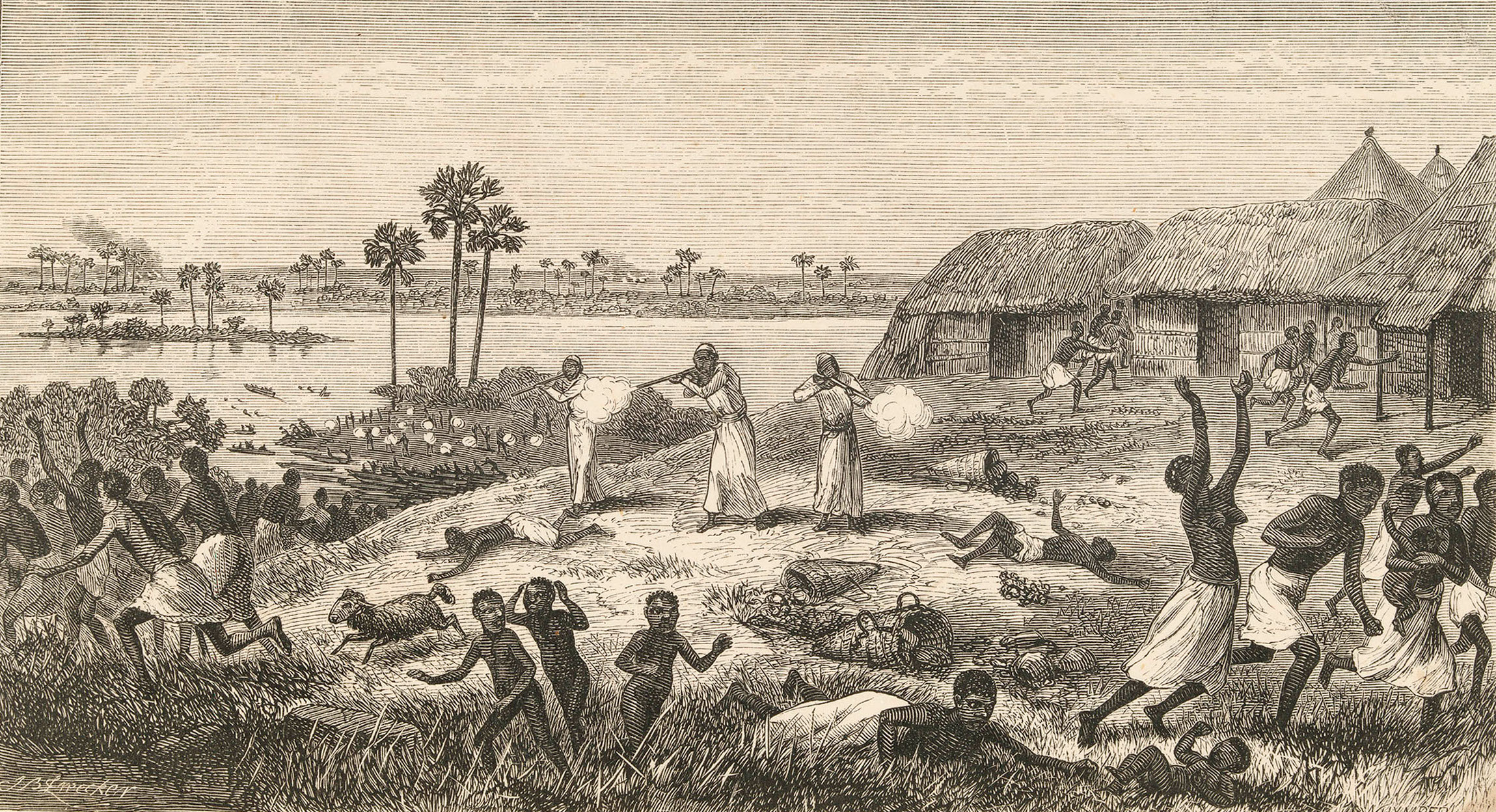
Three men of Dugumbé ben Habib raiding the market of Nyangwe on 15 July 1871

Arab-Swahili traders relied heavily on local intermediaries, often Bavira or Babembe, to supply captives. Oral testimonies suggest that the Fuliiru and Vira occasionally participated indirectly by traveling to neighboring areas, such as Bushi, under the guise of seeking marriage arrangements, but in practice, they sought out women and children to be sold into slavery. Historian Jacques Depelchin highlighted that Uvira functioned as "dépôt and a transit point" for caravans traveling northward through Kabare Territory and along the Lowa River to Kirundu, situated on the Congo River south of Kisangani. To support this traffic, the Arab-Swahili established warehouses at Kalundu, Mulongwe, Lubuga, and Sange, where goods and captives obtained in the hinterland were stored. They did not raid the Uvira hinterland directly as they employed middlemen "on location" and sought alliances with mwamis. As historian Bishikwabo Chubaka observed, it seems unlikely that Arab-Swahili merchants ventured beyond Uvira before 1870, largely out of fear of the interior populations. Burton himself, in 1858, described Uvira as the northernmost limit of Arab-Swahili advance at that time, and this impression was later corroborated by David Livingstone and Henry Morton Stanley in 1871, who confirmed that the northern Tanganyika littoral remained untouched by slave traders. Thereafter, with the rise of Rumaliza, they extended their reach into Kivu. Historian J. Marissal dates this expansion from 1872, and especially after 1886.

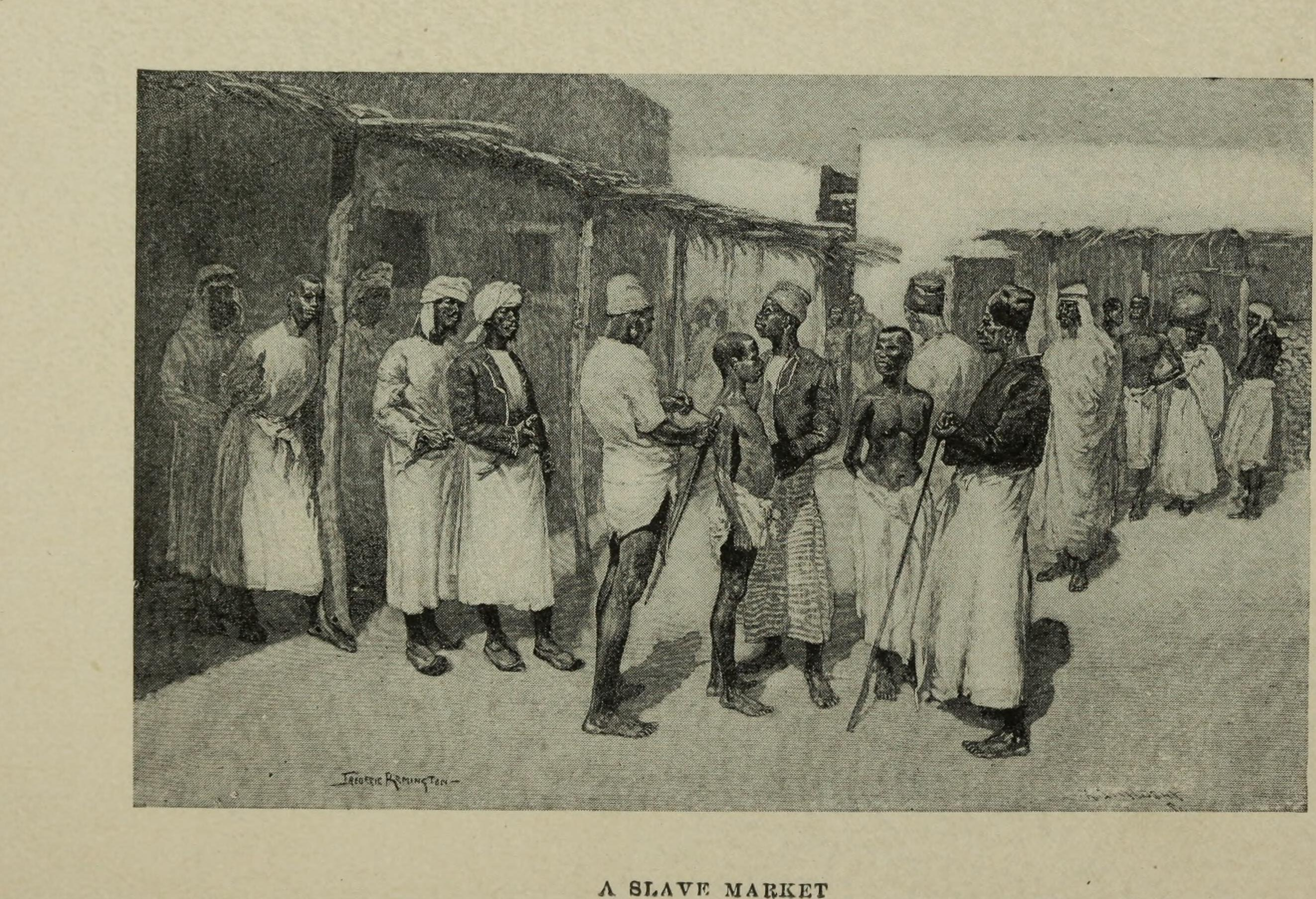
A 19th-century image showing an Arab-Swahili slave market, a typical scene in East and Central Africa during the height of the 19th-century slave trade. Slave raiders, often operating from bases in Ujiji, Unyanyembe, and Maniema, pushed deep into the Congo Basin, capturing men, women, and children to be sold along trade routes stretching to the Indian Ocean.

==== Rumaliza's expansion, famine, and disease ====
Rumaliza intensified incursions into the Bufuliiru, Bushi, and Rwanda between 1880 and 1894. At first, such relationships were cordial. Chiefs such as Musabwa (a Vira chief) were initially partners, but when tensions rose, the consequences were fatal as Musabwa was killed by Arab-Swahili traders around 1880, likely due to perceived hostility. Similarly, Nyamugira I, a Fuliiru chief, nearly shared the same fate but survived by retreating westward to Lwindi. However, they recalibrated their approach, and, rather than devastating the Bavira, they co-opted them as commercial intermediaries with neighboring Bafuliiru, Bashi, Banyarwanda, and even populations farther west in Maniema and Bulega. According to George Weis, this collaboration enabled the Bavira to avoid the demographic collapse observed in other regions, a claim supported by records indicating sustained population growth along Uvira's coastline. Chubaka adds that the Bavira, along with the Barundi of the Ruzizi Plain, increasingly collaborated with the traders, gradually distancing themselves from the authority of the mwami of Bufuliru, ceasing to pay tribute, and leveraging their alliances to assert greater local autonomy. Bavira and Barundi chiefs even served as guides for slave caravans, assisting in the pursuit of the fugitive mwami Nyamugira I. While the coastal populations showed varying degrees of cooperation, the interior regions fiercely resisted Arab-Swahili encroachment. Chiefs of Bashi and Bafuliiru remained firmly opposed to any contact with slave traders. Arab-Swahili forces and their allies were repeatedly compelled to retreat in the face of fierce resistance from the Bashi, Banyarwanda, and Barundi. As Chubaka noted, "Bushi were able to hold off the Swahili until the cruel famine of 1890, which ravaged South Kivu, opened the door to slavery there". During this severe drought (kikamu kikayu), the desperation for survival drove some families to sell relatives in exchange for food. Chubaka also records that Bavira families were compelled to exchange children and dependents with the Arab-Swahili under such conditions. By 1892, Rumaliza had extended Arab-Swahili influence as far as Kaziba Chiefdom, where the traders negotiated peace with mwami Cimanye I. Father Van der Burgt noted in his Dictionary that by 1897–8, there were a few discreet slave dealers in Uzige (in the region of Usumbura), Bangwana (Islamized people from Unyamwezi or the Congo basin), Basumbwa, Buvira, and Bayangayanga (peddlers from the southern part of Burundi, specialized in the trade of salt and iron). He added that a boy was worth two to four fundo or strings of beads, while a girl was worth twice as much (a fundo was valued at 0.30F at that time).

The Arab-Swahili era coincided with outbreaks of smallpox (karanda), leprosy (bandoro), sleeping sickness, and venereal disease. Inhabitants of Uvira later associated these calamities with the arrival of Arab-Swahili traders, whether justly or not. Oral testimonies suggest that these diseases caused more visible suffering than the raids themselves.

==== Economy ====
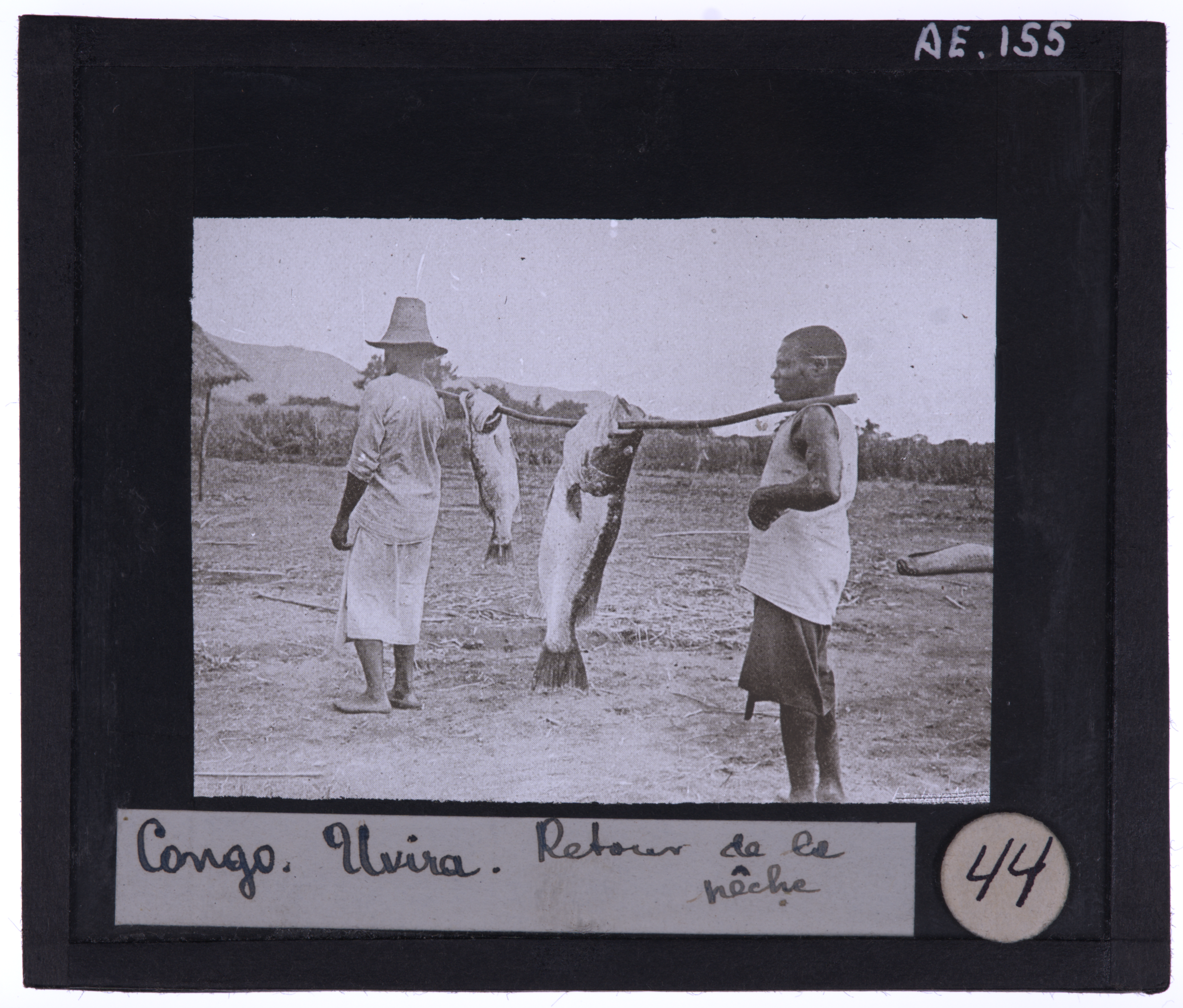
"Retour de la pêche" (Return from fishing) in Uvira, 1913.

The Arab-Swahili trade initially centered on slaves and ivory, but by the latter half of the 19th century, it diversified to include rubber, hides, and agricultural products. In return, traders offered beads, cloth, copper wire, and salt, which functioned as commodities and as forms of currency. Over time, the introduction of new crops such as rice, mangoes, cassava, and sugarcane altered local agricultural practices. The Fuliiru and Vira peoples were actively involved as suppliers, transporters, and middlemen in these exchanges, with the former acting as carriers of ivory and rubber, often sourced from regions to the west and north of Uvira, and transporting these goods to Arab-Swahili depots on Lake Tanganyika. The journeys, particularly to regions such as Itombwe, Bulega, and Maniema, were arduous and could take between six and twelve months, in contrast to the relatively shorter expeditions across the Ruzizi River to Rwanda and Burundi.

According to Richard Francis Burton:

The Uvira trade is important, the place is very busy because of the abundance and the low price of food: it is a large warehouse of slaves, ivory, clothing of bark and iron objects of the northern region of the lake, and in the travel season, it is rare that a day passes without several canoes coming there to fetch goods and food. Rice is not grown there, but sorghum and maize are bought there.

Trade expeditions in the region were organized as collective ventures that required significant coordination and resources. Wealthy traders typically led caravans consisting of 20 to 30 porters, providing food and logistical support, as well as exercising leadership. Accounts from the period describe how these groups would disperse to search for ivory or rubber, only to reconvene at predetermined times to begin their return journeys. These expeditions were fraught with risks, including frequent ambushes and occasional mass fatalities. Despite the ostensibly egalitarian nature of these collective trading ventures, decision-making authority was concentrated in the hands of the wealthiest traders, who controlled the selection of routes, schedules, and destinations. Arab-Swahili sponsorship played a crucial role in these operations, offering financial backing and military protection, thus positioning these traders as intermediaries within a larger, mercantile capitalist system.

The presence of Arab-Swahili traders in the region was characterized by a system of exploitation at multiple levels. The value of goods exchanged often failed to correspond to the value of the raw materials extracted, a dynamic later described by scholars as the "circular economy of underdevelopment". This system involved the export of raw materials at low prices, which were subsequently re-imported as expensive manufactured goods, increasing foreign merchants while draining the local economy. However, certain local specialists, particularly those involved in the hoe-to-cattle exchange system, were able to convert imported goods into sustainable capital. Unlike rubber or ivory, which were finite and risk-laden, cattle offered a self-reproducing form of wealth that thus girded social prestige and provided economic stability. Prominent figures like Fuliiru Mwami Katembo rose to prominence by avoiding overreliance on ivory and rubber, instead focusing on the more sustainable trade in hoes and cattle. By the turn of the 20th century, the depletion of ivory, rubber, and slave supplies, coupled with the increasing control exerted by Belgian colonial authorities, led to the decline of Arab-Swahili dominance in the Uvira's trade networks.

==== Socio-cultural transformation ====
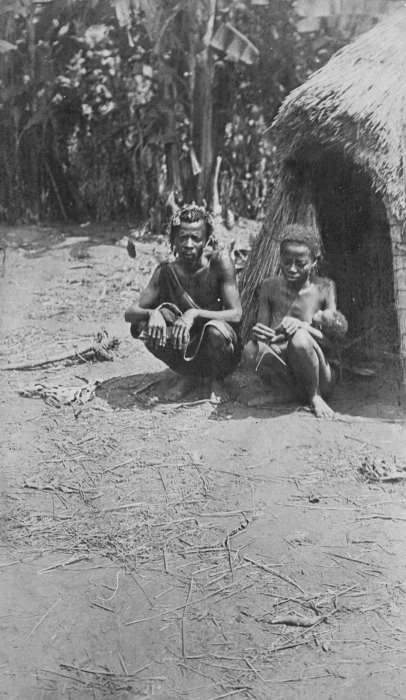
A Bavira family in front of their hut in Uvira, 1913. Photograph by P.F. Hubrecht.

The integration into Arab-Swahili commercial networks brought significant socio-cultural transformations to Uvira, as beneficiaries of trade increasingly sought to distinguish themselves through new behaviors and material culture. Affluent local elites began adopting distinctive attire such as the djellaba or kanzu, as the spread of Kiswahili and Islam became increasingly associated with notions of civility and prestige. Islamic conversion brought with it spiritual change and the adoption of new social norms, including male circumcision, female hygiene rituals, and the use of water for ablution in place of traditional means. The consumption of ritually impure animals, including pork, elephant, and various forms of wild game, was also abandoned. Islamic names like Shaban(i), Mariam(u), Ramadhan(i), and Massan(i) remain prevalent among contemporary Bavira families. These changes created new social hierarchies based not on lineage, but on cultural assimilation. People who embraced Arab-Swahili customs and Islam were often perceived as more "civilized", regardless of ethnic or ancestral background.

In many instances, local auxiliaries and intermediaries were indistinguishable from their Arab-Swahili counterparts in the public eye, as prestige became increasingly tied to participation in the trade economy and adherence to Islamic cultural norms. Wealthy merchants, regardless of origin, accumulated land, dependents, wives, and prestige goods that rivaled the power of traditional chiefs. Some chiefs, recognizing the shifting balance of power, aligned themselves with Arab-Swahili traders to retain or enhance their authority.

These political ramifications were particularly pronounced in Bufuliru, where coastal Bavira and Barundi deepened their collaboration with Arab-Swahili traders. Meanwhile, more interior Shi and Fuliiru chiefs remained staunchly resistant to external influence.

==== Anti-slavery campaign ====
In the late 19th century, Uvira and the wider Kivu region became a flashpoint between colonial forces and Arab-Swahili slave traders. The 1884–85 Berlin Conference had tasked European powers with eradicating slavery in their territories. For the Congo Free State (État Indépendant du Congo; EIC), this meant dismantling the Indian Ocean slave trade and the Arab-Swahili commercial system entrenched in Maniema and Tanganyika. King Leopold II initially approached the EIC as a commercial enterprise, preferring to negotiate with Arab-Swahili traders rather than expelling them. Force Publique actions, justified as efforts to liberate local populations from Arab-Swahili slavers, were in practice more focused on pacification and the consolidation of revenue. Depelchin noted that Arab-Swahilis in Uvira and Luvungi had developed extensive trade networks, which colonial authorities considered too valuable to dismantle. Although Belgian colonizers at first tolerated Arab-Swahili merchants for their role as intermediaries, they later branded them "parasites" and subversive, particularly because of their Islamic influence. In 1893, Francis Dhanis received the mission to destroy the strongholds of the Arab-Swahili traders in Kasongo, Nyangwe, Kabambare, and Lulindi. After the fall of Kasongo in April 1893 and Kabambare in January 1894, many slave traders regrouped further north in Uvira, on Lake Tanganyika's western shore.

From Kabambare, Commander Hubert Lothaire advanced toward Tanganyika and dispatched Constant Wauters at the head of a column to establish contact with the soldiers of the Belgian Anti-Slavery Society (Société antiesclavagiste de Belgique), commanded by Édouard Descamps. The junction of the two forces took place on 10 February 1894, some sixty kilometers from Kalemie. Their combined strength then marched northward in pursuit of Rumaliza, advancing so rapidly that the fugitives had no time to reorganize their defenses. Within only six weeks, Lothaire succeeded in clearing Arab-Swahili influence from the entire corridor between Kabambare and Uvira. On 17 March 1894, the allied forces arrived at Uvira, where they encountered the most formidable of the slave traders' strongholds: a fortified position known as "Bwana Soro", which was considered at the time a model fortress capable of resisting prolonged siege. Rumaliza and the remnants of his forces escaped across Lake Tanganyika into German East Africa. The Belgian authorities then integrated the established trade networks into their colonial administration to generate tax revenue. Uvira and Luvungi became important centers of commerce, employment, and protection for local mountain populations. The alliance between European colonizers and Arab-Swahili traders, however, was short-lived and dissolved around 1920 as colonial structures took full precedence.

=== Colonial period ===
Throughout the 19th century, several European explorers carried out expeditions to Uvira. In 1857–1858, Richard Francis Burton and John Hanning Speke embarked on a mission that brought them to Lake Tanganyika, while in 1871, Henry Morton Stanley joined David Livingstone at Ujiji, where they explored the mouth of the Ruzizi River. Following Uvira's capture in March 1894, the EIC sought to consolidate its authority in Kivu by establishing military and administrative outposts, creating small stations along Lake Tanganyika at "Lukata" and "Lubenga". From Uvira itself, the first official administrative mission departed toward the northern plain in July 1894. It was led by Lieutenants Lange and Long, accompanied by non-commissioned officer Chargeois. The mission's explicit objective was to "search for a communication route between Lakes Kivu and Tanganyika and to link the itineraries of Von Götzen (on Lake Kivu) and Baumann (on Lake Tanganyika)". Despite determined effort, the column could not advance beyond the Pemba's gorges and rapids on Lake Kivu's southern tip, which proved impassable. In 1895, however, Lange, by then commander of the Kibanga post, resumed explorations along the Ruzizi River and founded two new stations: one on the right bank at Luberizi and another on the left bank at Nyakagunda. At the same time, Captain Descamps constructed a small garrison at Pemba, notably placing it under the command of a Black non-commissioned officer, a rare example of local rank-and-file promotion within the Force Publique hierarchy. In the following year, 1896, Lieutenant Long extended this administrative network further north by founding two additional posts on the Ruzizi, at Lubunga and "Lwakimlita". Uvira also became a base for Catholic missionaries: Fathers Victor Roelens and De Beerst arrived from Mpala (Kalemie) in 1895, assisted by the non-commissioned officer Chargeois. Their efforts to evangelize the Bushi region, however, met with resistance, particularly at Kamanyola, where Bashi forced them to retreat southward. Meanwhile, that same year, Fuliiru also opposed colonial encroachments.

==== The mutiny and renewed conflict (1898–1901) ====
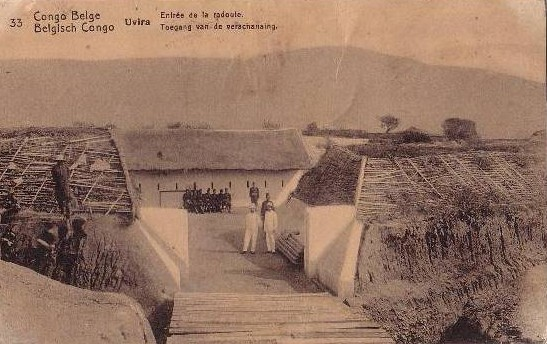
Uvira fortress entrance, Belgian Congo, 1910s

Although the anti-slavery campaign had dismantled Arab-Swahili power, instability soon returned with the mutiny of the Francis Dhanis column in February 1897. The mutiny broke out on 14 February in Uélé, where Dhanis' column had been charged with advancing north to occupy the Lado Enclave. Severe food shortages triggered a revolt among African troops belonging to the Kandolo and Saliboko groups. The uprising began with the massacre of several European commanders, including Melen, Adrian Binnie, and Closset, alongside loyal African soldiers who had remained faithful to Dhanis. For two months, the rebels enjoyed some success until a counteroffensive led by Stanley threw their forces into disarray. Many fled in disorder, dispersing southward and eventually regrouping in former Arab-Swahili centers of Uvira and Baraka. On 14 November 1898, the mutineers captured Kabambare with little resistance, an event that opened the route toward Kasongo, Nyangwe, and the northern shores of Lake Tanganyika. Instead of pressing their advantage, the rebels became mired in looting and internal disputes, losing critical time while the Force Publique reorganized. Dhanis himself counterattacked, forcing the mutineers to abandon Kabambare after setting it ablaze. From Mpala, Joseph Meyers, supported by Lieutenant Charles Delhaise, advanced northward along the shore of Lake Tanganyika. On 31 December 1898, they struck the mutineers at the village of "Bwana Debwa", killing large numbers of rebels. Survivors regrouped and pushed toward Baraka and Uvira, which had already been abandoned for over a year by the EIC. The EIC resolved to reoccupy the abandoned posts in Kivu and dispatched Lieutenant Dubois to Uvira at the head of a detachment, but his force was ambushed at "Birizi", where Dubois himself was killed. In response, the Force Publique entrusted Commanders Célestin Hecq and Georges Hennebert with the task of retaking Uvira and securing the entire Ruzizi–Kivu region.

With a force of some 800 men, Hecq and Hennebert launched a series of coordinated offensives in October 1899, defeating the mutineers at Lungula, Baraka, and Kaboge. In the latter battle, the last significant mutineer leader, Changuvu, was killed, reportedly by five bullets fired personally by Hennebert. The remaining rebels attempted to regroup at Uvira, but they were pursued by Hecq, who recaptured the town on 16 October 1899, which then ended the revolt's last stronghold. After these victories, the Force Publique fortified Uvira and installed artillery to secure the post, making it the linchpin of colonial administration in the region. The surrounding Kivu posts were reorganized, and new stations were established at Luberizi, Cyangugu (Rwanda), and Nyakagunda (Burundi) to prevent additional insurgency.

Though Uvira was secured, remnants of the mutineers dispersed across Rwanda, the Ruzizi Plain, and the Bulega forest. A report dated 1 August 1900 recorded that a group of 400 men, 100 women, and boys crossed the Ruzizi River and surrendered to the German post in Rwanda, handing over 390 rifles, a formal surrender that signaled the beginning of the collapse of the mutineers' military capacity, though other factions attempted to regroup and continue resistance. In 1901, another band set out from Uvira in an attempt to reach Lokandu, but the Force Publique officer Anderson, acting under the orders of Fernand-Octave-Stanislas Éloy, was tasked with blocking their advance and received crucial assistance from Ruzizi Plain Murundi chief Kinyoni. Nevertheless, Anderson's pursuit was halted by the dense bamboo forests separating Kaziba from Bufuliiru, which prevented additional movement, allowing the rebels to divert toward Ngweshe and Kabare, where local inhabitants massacred large numbers of them. Meanwhile, another group of mutineers fortified themselves in nearby forests, firing occasional shots in the direction of Uvira. In response, Commander Éloy dispatched a detachment of 350 men under the command of Frederik-Valdemar Olsen and Danna, who confronted an estimated 500 rebels and rapidly dispersed them. The mutineers split, with one group fleeing directly into Rwanda and another, after clashing with Bashi warriors, being defeated and ultimately surrendering to the German authorities, and these operations crushed the last organized resistance.

==== Consolidation and administrative transformation ====
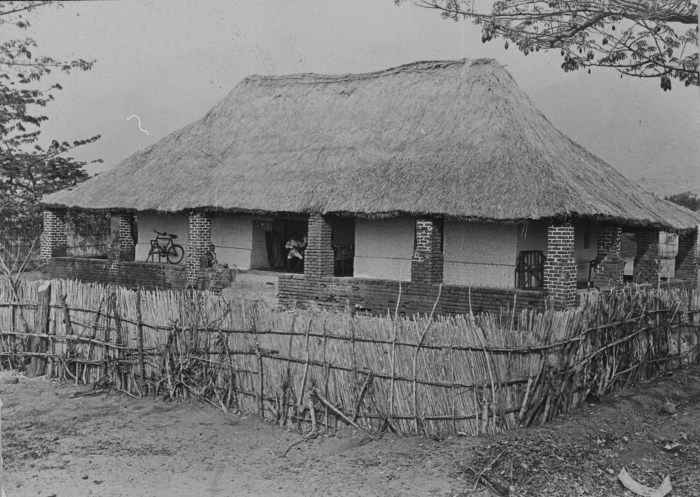
Residential house in Uvira, 1913. Photograph from the Tropenmuseum Collection, Nationaal Museum van Wereldculturen.

Following the suppression of slave traders and mutineers, the EIC established a permanent occupation in Kivu to consolidate Leopold II's authority and counter German and British territorial ambitions. From the outset, Uvira emerged as a strategic stronghold as it provided an advantageous position for surveillance over German military outposts in Rwanda, Burundi, and Tanzania mainland. In 1900, the EIC expanded from south to north by establishing a chain of military posts, including Kalembeleme, Luvungi, Nyakukemba, Bobandana, Goma, Lolo, Rutshuru, and Kasindi, with these installations collectively manned by nearly 1,800 soldiers under the command of Inspecteur d'État Paul Costermans, whose mission was to secure the Kivu basin and preclude German encroachment. King Leopold II himself accentuated the strategic indispensability of the region, reinforced this stance even on his deathbed, famously admonishing Prime Minister Frans Schollaert: "If you cede Ruzizi-Kivu to the Germans, your old King will rise from his grave to reproach you". Numerous police and military campaigns were launched, aimed at subjugating resistant populations such as the Bafuliiru and Bashi, while the Bavira often acted as auxiliaries and intermediaries in the colonial project.

Initially subordinated to the Stanley Falls District, Kivu underwent administrative reorganization in 1900 with the creation of the Territory of Ruzizi-Kivu (Territoire de Ruzizi-Kivu), extending from Kamanyola to the Kihimbi River, and with Uvira designated as its administrative capital. On 17 October 1900, a war council established in Uvira subdivided the territory into two administrative zones: Rutshuru–Beni and Uvira. By 1904, the Uvira zone comprised six sectors: Uvira, Luvungi, Baraka, Kalembelembe, Bobandana, and Nyalukemba (modern-day Bukavu). On 18 October 1908, King Leopold II ceded the EIC to Belgium, transitioning the territory into what would become the Belgian Congo. A ministerial decree of 11 September 1911 placed Kivu under the jurisdiction of the Stanleyville District in Orientale Province. Uvira retained its role as administrative headquarters, but the territory was restructured into three new sectors: Tanganyika (capital: Uvira), Lake Edward (capital: Beni), and Rutshuru. On 3 November 1913, Kivu was elevated to district status within Orientale Province, and in 1914 the capital shifted from Uvira to Rutshuru. Despite this administrative centrality diminution, Uvira remained an important commercial hub at the crossroads of routes linking Burundi, Tanzania, Shaba, and the rest of Kivu, as well as a fortified garrison town, with its contingent growing from 650 to over 1,300 soldiers between 1900 and 1909. During September 1914, German forces violated Congolese neutrality by destroying Belgian positions, boats, and telegraph lines in Uvira, which then prompted Belgian and British counteroffensives that systematically dismantled German strongholds along the frontier.

Resistance to colonial demands was widespread. Chiefs who resisted forced labor and taxation were imprisoned or exiled through the system of rélegation, with several prominent Bafuliiru leaders, including Mweni, Mbabaro, and Mukogabwe, deported during the 1920s and 1930s. In contrast, the Vira largely cooperated with the colonial administration, an alliance that enabled them to preserve limited autonomy vis-à-vis their overlord, the Fuliiru chief Nyamugira I. These political asymmetries were codified by a decree of 18 August 1928 from the District Commissioner of Kivu (commissaire de district du Kivu), which created three distinct chiefdoms: Bafuliiru, Bavira, and Ruzizi Plain Chiefdom, forming the core administrative units of the newly constituted Uvira Territory. Within this framework, Uvira, alongside Kiliba and Sange, emerged as one of the principal urban centers of the territory. Colonial rule significantly altered the traditional system of succession and authority among chiefs. Oral testimonies indicate that, before European intervention, succession rules were respected mainly; however, colonial interference eroded the traditional legitimacy. Chiefs like Mukogabwe (chief from 1914 to 1927) abused their power, but his removal was not solely due to atrocities; it also stemmed from his failure to adhere to Belgian expectations and his conflicts with wealthy cattle owners, whose cooperation with the colonial administration was crucial. Successions became increasingly manipulated, with figures such as the Barundi leader Rubisha seeking to replace legitimate heirs through colonial favor. The political system established in Uvira Territory resembled a quasi-feudal structure, with chiefs extracting tribute from their subjects while simultaneously serving colonial demands for labor and taxes. Local populations found themselves bound by obligations to their traditional rulers and the colonial state, creating a hybrid system that blended pre-capitalist and capitalist modes of production. This structure allowed Belgium to exploit the region's land and labor while maintaining indigenous authority, which redirected tensions between chiefs and their subjects away from confrontation with the colonial powers.

In 1932, a deep-water harbor was finished in Uvira to enhance its strategic advantage. Around the same time, a railway line was constructed, initially planned to connect Uvira with Bukavu, though it was only completed as far as Kamanyola, just north of Uvira. However, despite these infrastructural developments, Uvira did not fully attain the status of a colonial town in the classical sense. It was envisioned as an urban administrative center, but its growth was hindered by the rapid expansion of nearby cities such as Usumbura (now Bujumbura in Burundi) and Bukavu. The town's physical layout was shaped by colonial segregationist policies, with Europeans residing in the administrative center, where government buildings and residential quarters (quartiers) were concentrated, while Africans were confined to peripheral settlements such as Mulongwe and Kalundu. Others lived in adjacent rural areas that remain part of Uvira's territorial footprint today. This segregated spatial organization played a role in Uvira's development as a semi-urban area rather than a fully developed town.

=== Kwilu rebellion ===
In the early 1960s, Uvira and its surrounding regions were affected by the wider crisis associated with the Kwilu rebellion of 1964, led by Pierre Mulele. This movement, often described as the Mulelist rebellion, spread across several provinces, including Kwilu, Tshopo, Maniema, and northern Katanga. It drew strength from rural dissatisfaction with unfulfilled post-independence promises of reform, compounded by worsening economic conditions.

Uvira's local dynamics also complicated the conflict as political tensions arose between Moïse Marandura, elected to the provincial assembly in 1960, and Fuliiru Mwami Simba. Marandura attempted to depose Simba, not to assume the chieftaincy himself, but to claim the broader title of "president of the Bufuliiru". When this initiative failed, he sought to renegotiate Simba's agreements permitting Barundi settlement along the Ruzizi River and aspired to be recognized as mwami of the Ruzizi Plain Chiefdom. The unresolved dispute fueled hostilities when the rebellion erupted. Marandura's rhetoric in 1963 framed the rebellion as a grassroots struggle against politicians and traditional chiefs, accusing them of betrayal. Although Patrice Lumumba's Mouvement National Congolais (MNC) had been weakened after Lumumba's assassination in 1961, it continued to provide ideological grounding by portraying itself as a defender of rural communities. Nonetheless, the Mulelist rebellion lacked cohesion and ideological clarity, often devolving into local vendettas. In Uvira, the insurgents, predominantly Fuliiru and Vira alongside some Barundi and Banyamulenge, directed violence against traditional chiefs, wealthy individuals, and community elites, particularly those owning cattle, trucks, or shops. Many chiefs and sub-chiefs fled to Bukavu or across the border into Burundi, while indiscriminate killings undermined the movement's broader support.

The violence precipitated mass displacement, with many residents fleeing to Burundi. This exodus weakened the rebellion locally, and by late 1965 government forces had reasserted control in the Ruzizi Plain. Pockets of resistance, however, persisted in mountainous areas, with reports of insurgent activity continuing into the early 1970s.

==== Post-rebellion ====
In 1971, Uvira was designated as the administrative center for the South Kivu District. It attracted a mix of populations, including civil servants, many of whom regarded their postings as temporary and often undesirable due to Uvira's lack of amenities, entertainment options, and basic infrastructure. At the same time, it became a destination for youth migrating from surrounding rural areas, drawn by the hope of employment and a better standard of living. For many young migrants, both educated and uneducated, rural life had become increasingly untenable. Those with some schooling often felt unsuited for agricultural work, while others with no formal education still aspired to urban livelihoods, even in Uvira's semi-urban setting. However, opportunities for formal employment were scarce. A limited number of industrial jobs existed, including those at the cotton factory (formerly Agricokivu, later Onaritex), fishing operations, small-scale construction, and workshops operated by the Catholic diocese. Petty trade was also difficult to enter due to high startup costs and limited capital access.

=== Conflict and insecurity ===
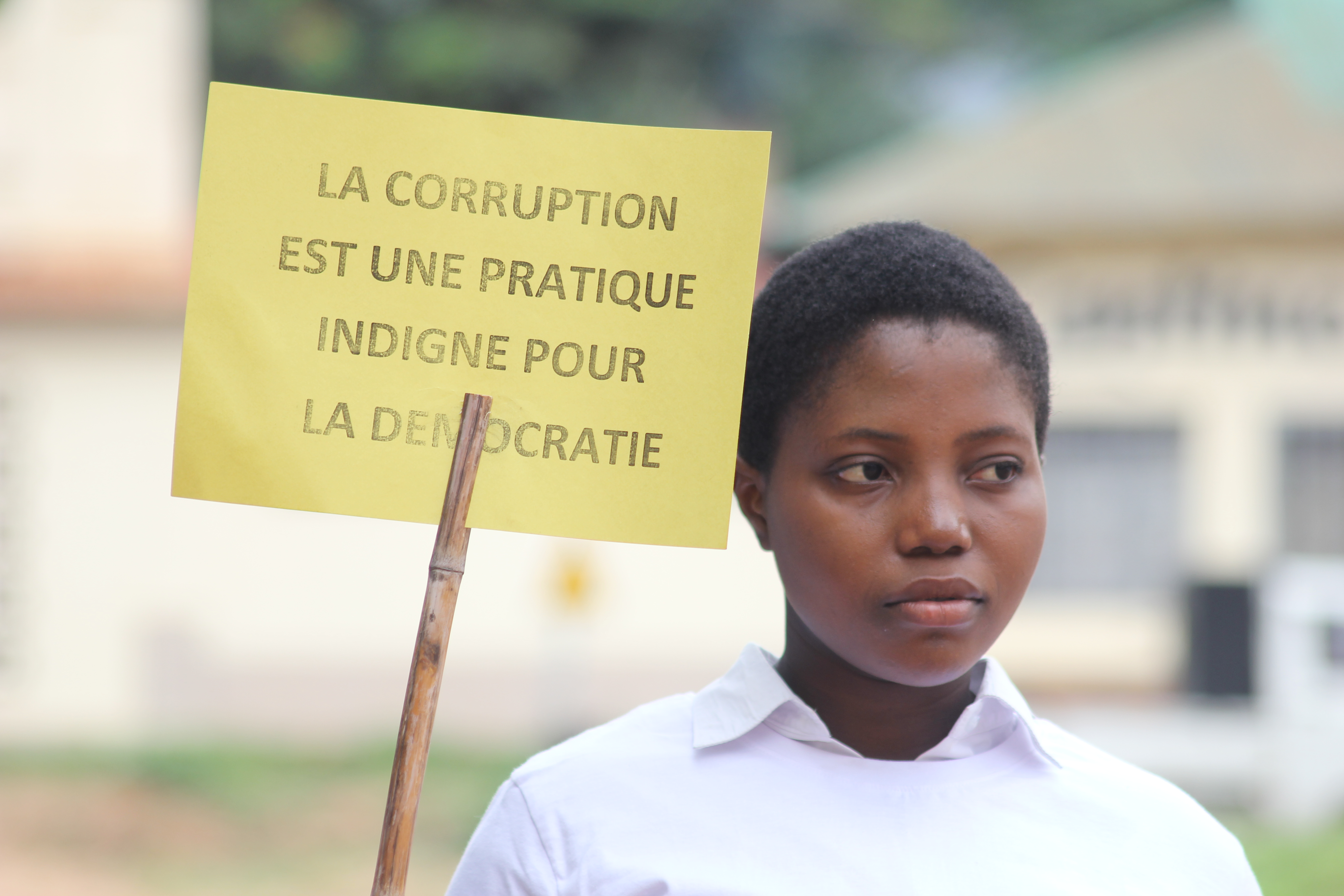
A student in Uvira spreading anti-corruption message

For more than three decades, Uvira has been characterized by persistent armed conflict, militia activity, and inter-communal violence. The region became a focal battleground during the First Congo War (1996–1997), which was itself a direct consequence of the regional upheavals following the 1994 Rwandan genocide. Following the genocide, the Rwandan Patriotic Front (RPF) under Paul Kagame seized power in Kigali, ousting the regime of Juvénal Habyarimana. While pursuing génocidaires, the RPF simultaneously engaged in systematic violence against Hutu civilians. A confidential report prepared by Robert Gersony for the United Nations High Commissioner for Refugees (UNHCR) documented large-scale atrocities, estimating that between 5,000 and 10,000 Hutus were executed monthly during the spring and summer of 1994. These killings reportedly followed a recurring pattern in which RPF forces summoned local populations to so-called "peace and reconciliation meetings", only to execute the assembled groups.

The violence triggered a massive exodus, with more than two million Rwandan Hutus, including civilians and Interahamwe militia members, fleeing into eastern Zaire, particularly into North and South Kivu. By this period, Mobutu Sese Seko's regime had lost much of its capacity to control the national territory. In early 1996, the Rwandan Patriotic Army (RPA), the Ugandan military, and the Forces Armées Burundaises (FAB) provided support to Banyamulenge and other Tutsi armed groups in the borderlands. On 18 October 1996, the Alliance of Democratic Forces for the Liberation of Congo (AFDL), led by Laurent-Désiré Kabila, was formally established with direct backing from the RPA and FAB. According to UNHCR estimates, Uvira Territory hosted approximately 219,466 refugees at the time, two-thirds of whom were Burundians, dispersed across eleven camps along the Ruzizi River. Their presence in densely concentrated sites made them acutely vulnerable to military operations. On the day of the AFDL's official proclamation, combined AFDL and RPA forces launched a coordinated assault in Uvira Territory, during which at least 88 civilians were killed in Kiliba, with 15 buried in Uvira.

Between 24 and 25 October 1996, AFDL, RPA, and FAB troops captured Uvira, routing the Forces Armées Zaïroises (FAZ) and consolidating control over the broader Uvira Territory. As Burundian and Rwandan refugees scattered in multiple directions, the occupying forces established checkpoints throughout the Ruzizi Plain, including at Bwegera, Sange, Luberizi, and Kiliba, as well as at strategic points such as the entrance to Uvira, Makobola II in Fizi Territory, and the Rushima ravine in Uvira Territory. At these posts, people were screened under the pretext of repatriation, with those identified as Rwandan or Burundian Hutus, often distinguished by accent, physical traits, or clothing, systematically separated and executed in nearby locations, and numerous mass killings were reported during this period.

==== Second Congo War and ongoing conflict ====
The outbreak of the Second Congo War (1998–2003) plunged Uvira and the broader Uvira Territory into renewed instability, the conflict emerging from the collapse of relations between President Laurent-Désiré Kabila and his former Rwandan and Ugandan allies. After toppling Mobutu in 1997, Kabila was accused of sidelining Tutsi elements within his administration in favor of loyalists from his Katangan base of support. At the same time, allegations arose that the United States had indirectly facilitated Rwanda's military capacity in order to secure access to the DRC's vast natural resources. In July 1998, a Rwanda Interagency Assessment Team (RIAT) from the U.S. Army reportedly provided training to Rwandan forces, while investigative journalist Keith Harmon Snow claimed that U.S. officials such as Roger Winter of the U.S. Committee for Refugees and Immigrants extended support to insurgent networks.

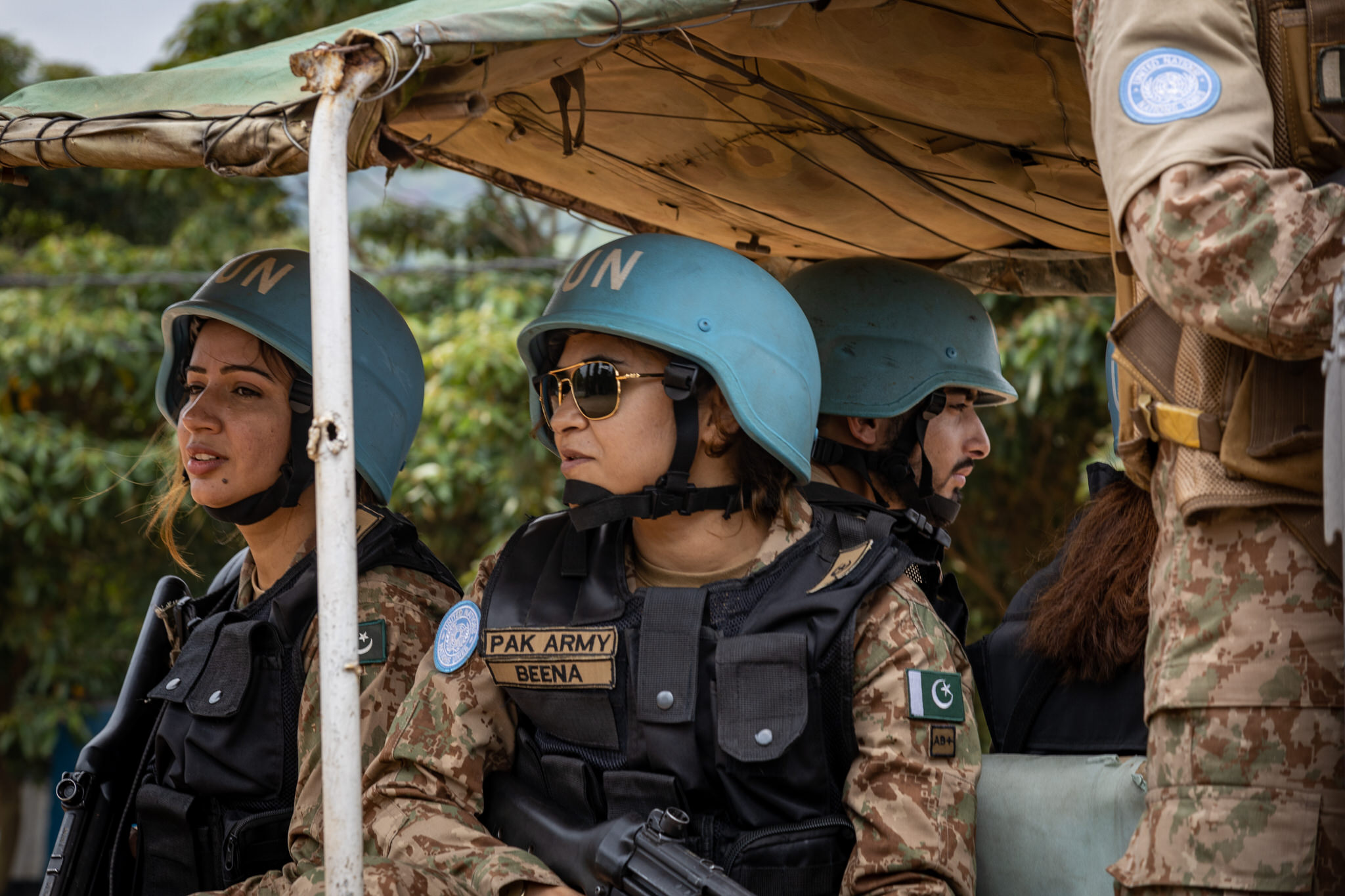
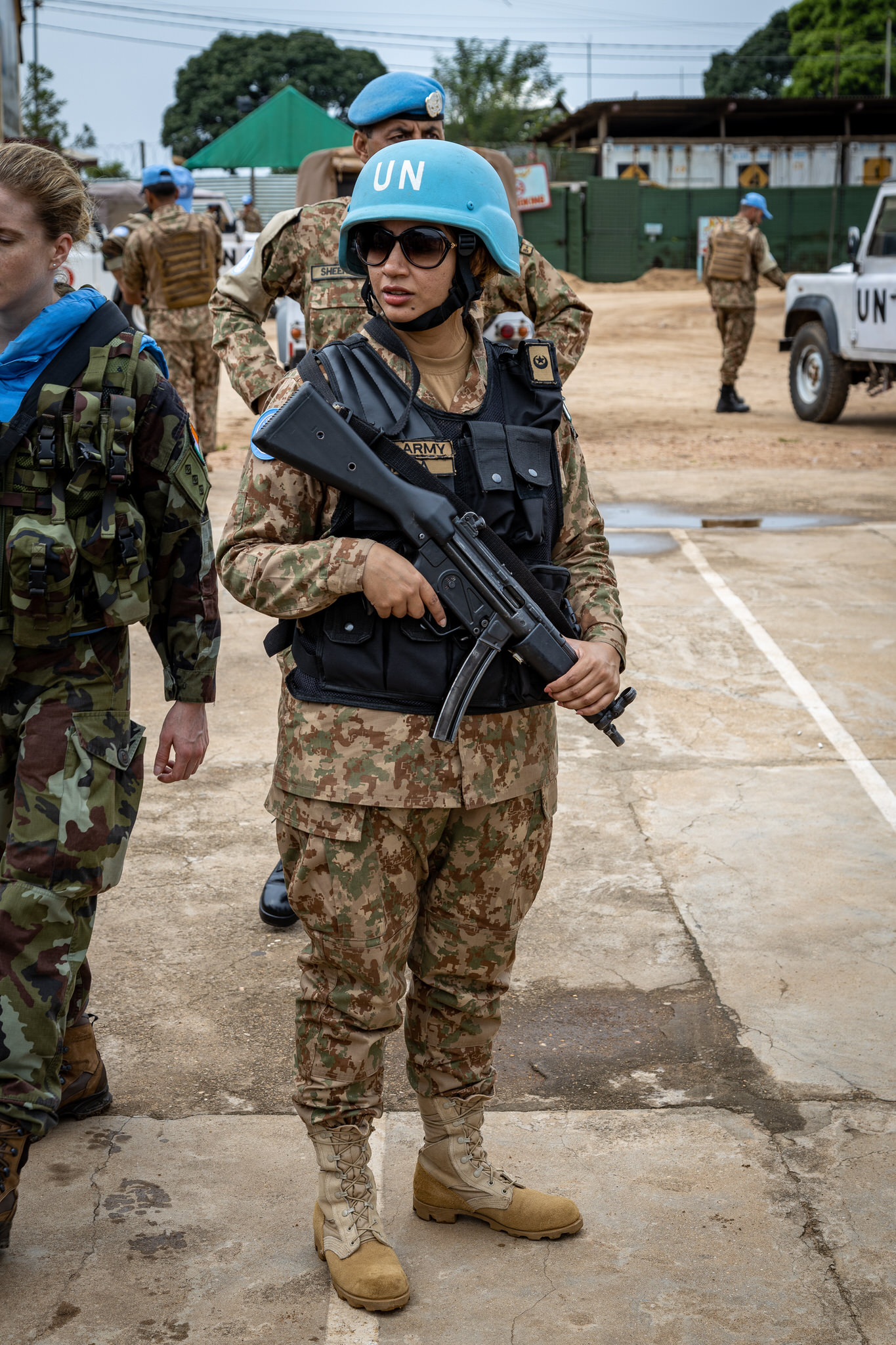
MONUSCO's Pakistani Female Engagement Team in Uvira

Tensions escalated sharply in July 1998 when Kabila, fearing a coup, dismissed Rwandan General James Kabarebe from his post as Chief of Staff of the Congolese Armed Forces (Forces armées congolaises; FAC) and ordered the withdrawal of all RPA personnel from Congolese territory. In response, Rwanda and Uganda sponsored the creation of a new insurgency, the Rassemblement Congolais pour la Démocratie (RCD). On 2 August 1998, mutinous Congolese soldiers allied with the RPA, the Ugandan People's Defence Force (UPDF), the FAB, and remnants of FAZ, announced their rebellion through Radio-Télévision Nationale Congolaise (RTNC) in Goma. Within weeks, the RCD and its allies had captured key urban centers across North and South Kivu, Orientale Province, and northern Katanga, and advanced deep into Équateur Province. Their attempted march on Kinshasa and Bas-Congo (now Kongo Central) was ultimately repelled by Forças Armadas Angolanas (FAA) and Zimbabwe Defence Forces (ZDF) intervention on behalf of Kabila. The war rapidly fractured the Congolese state into rival spheres of control as Kabila's government retained authority over the western and southern regions of the country, supported militarily by ZDF, FAA, the Namibia Defence Force (NDF), the Armée Nationale Tchadienne (ANT), and the Sudanese government. By contrast, the east fell under the control of the RCD's armed wing, the Armée Nationale Congolaise (ANC), backed principally by Rwanda, Uganda, and Burundi. In an effort to counterbalance the ANC's influence, Kinshasa cultivated alliances with a diverse spectrum of actors, including Mayi-Mayi groups, the Burundian Hutu movement Forces pour la Défense de la Démocratie (FDD), and remnants of the ex-Forces Armées Rwandaises (FAR) and Interahamwe, reorganized under the banner of the Armée de Libération du Rwanda (ALiR). Meanwhile, Uganda consolidated its grip on Orientale Province by sponsoring the Mouvement pour la Libération du Congo (MLC) under Jean-Pierre Bemba, which administered territories in Équateur Province. Growing rivalry between Uganda and Rwanda for territorial and economic influence triggered, in March 1999, a schism within the RCD, producing a pro-Rwandan faction (RCD-Goma) and a pro-Ugandan faction (RCD-Mouvement de Libération, later RCD-ML).

In Uvira and the wider Uvira Territory, RCD-Goma and the ANC secured control of major towns in collaboration with the RPA and FAB. However, their authority remained tenuous in rural areas, where resentment toward the RCD's reliance on Rwandan support and its perceived alignment with Tutsi and Banyamulenge communities fostered opposition. Reports of systematic abuses by RCD forces, including massacres, forced recruitment, and widespread sexual violence, also alienated local populations. This volatile environment provided fertile ground for the expansion of Mayi-Mayi militias, as young men joined established factions or founded new ones, such as Mudundu 40 in Walungu Territory. Some of these groups entered into tactical alliances with ex-FAR/Interahamwe units within the ALiR, as well as with the Burundian Hutu CNDD-FDD. While certain Mayi-Mayi divisions, notably General Padiri's forces in Bunyakiri and Colonel Dunia's Forces d'Autodéfense Populaires (FAP) in Shabunda Territory, received material assistance from Kinshasa, many operated autonomously. Their attacks on RCD-Goma positions prompted retaliatory operations by the ANC, RPA, and FAB, which often included indiscriminate violence against civilians, mass displacement, and large-scale sexual assault, and on 6 August 1998, these units killed tens of civilians in Uvira.

The official end of the war came in July 2003 with the signing of the Global and All-Inclusive Agreement on Transition in Kinshasa. However, despite the formal end of the war, the region continues to face sporadic outbreaks of violence, often involving armed groups, militias, and inter-communal tensions. These ongoing conflicts have resulted in further violence, population displacement, and human rights abuses in Uvira and its surrounding areas. In 2017, the CNPSC rebel group launched an attack on the city, which was repelled by the national army and MONUSCO forces. In December 2025, Uvira was seized by the Rwanda-backed M23 rebel group.

== Economy ==
=== Subsistence agriculture ===
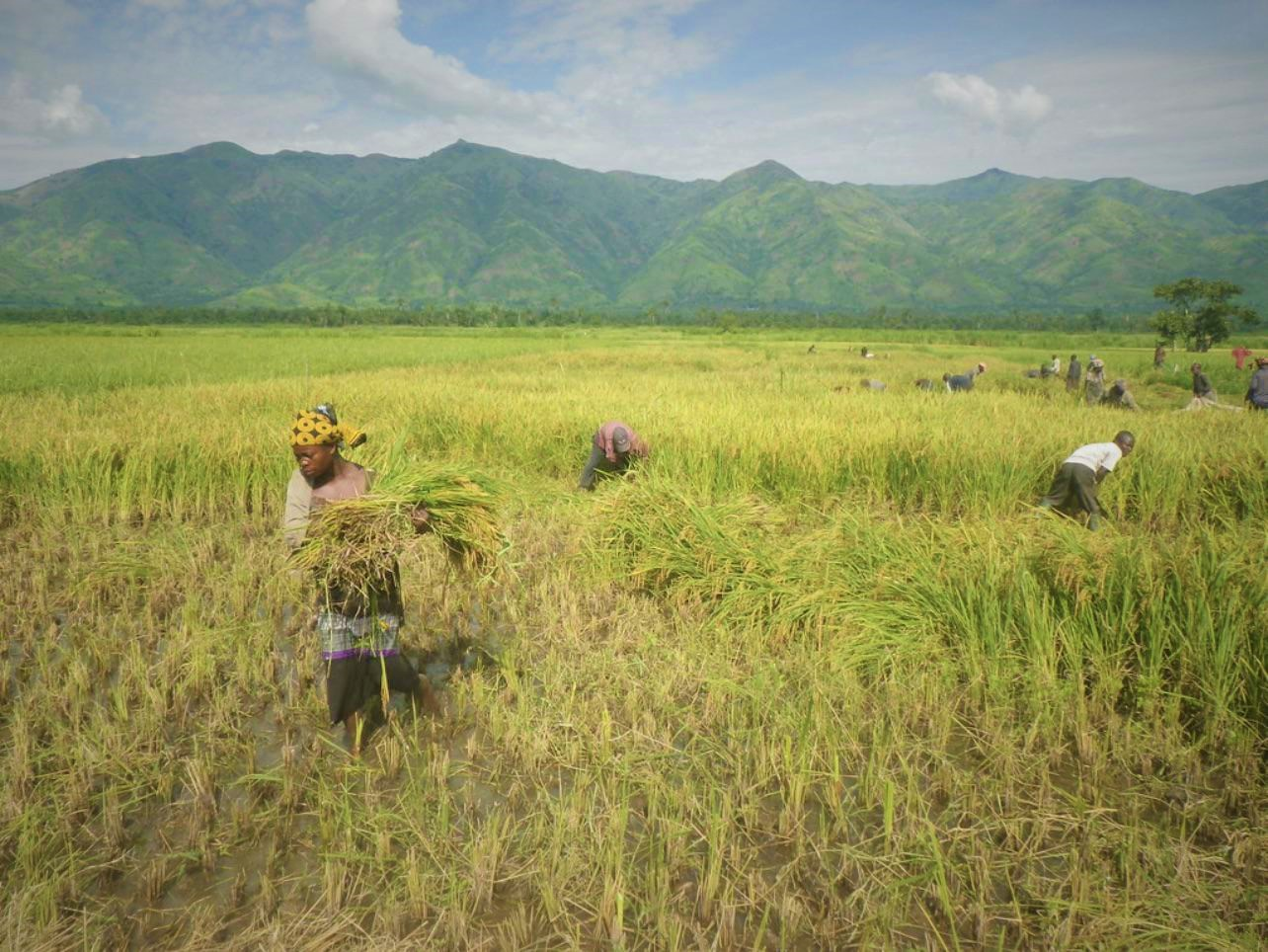
Rice cultivation In the Ruzizi Plain

The Uvira's economy is bolstered by its primary sector, driven by extensive family-based subsistence agriculture. The area yields a variety of crops, such as Irish potatoes, maize, beans, cowpeas, cabbage, and the newly introduced carrots, amaranths, onions, and spring onions. Staple crops include maize, Irish potatoes, and bush beans, while cowpeas are cultivated less frequently. Potatoes and maize were said to have been introduced in 1985 by a local NGO, Groupe Milima, and in 1987, historian Bishikwabo Chubaka recorded that "an area of 10 hectares had been sown with wheat, rice, corn, and beans in the vicinity of the Uvira post", compared to 19.5 hectares cultivated across the entire Uvira Territory.

In addition to crops, the city's food economy depends on its environmental resources: the fertile Ruzizi Plain yields agricultural surpluses, while the while upland areas are important for livestock farming. In recent innovations include the introduction of onion cultivation in Kitembe, pioneered by a local farmer, and the integration of amaranths and spring onions in Kahololo. Institutionally, Uvira hosts Nabahya Food Institute, a key agricultural organization, along with the International Institute of Tropical Agriculture's research station.

=== Fishing and livestock ===
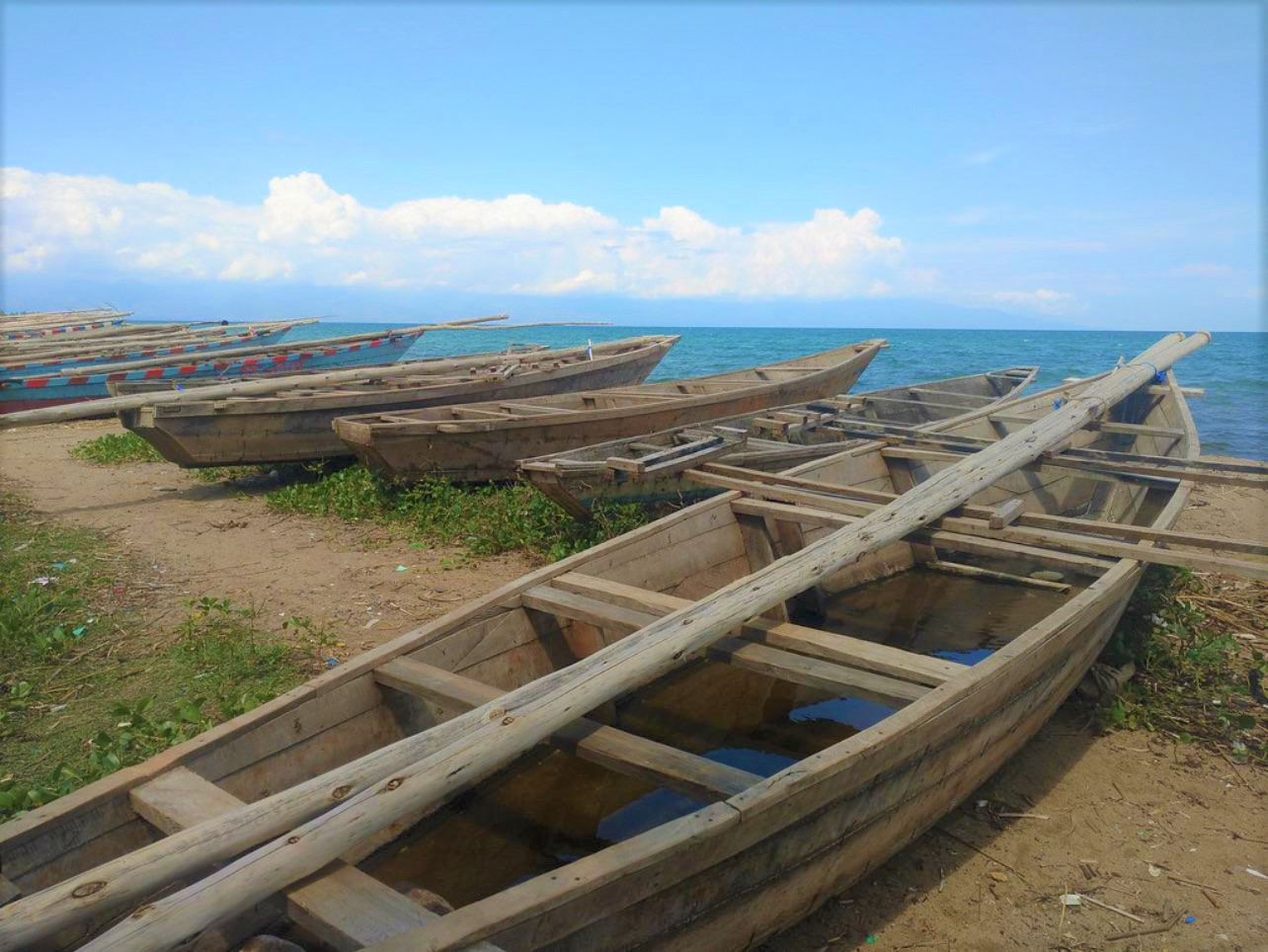
Fishing boats along Lake Tanganyika in Uvira

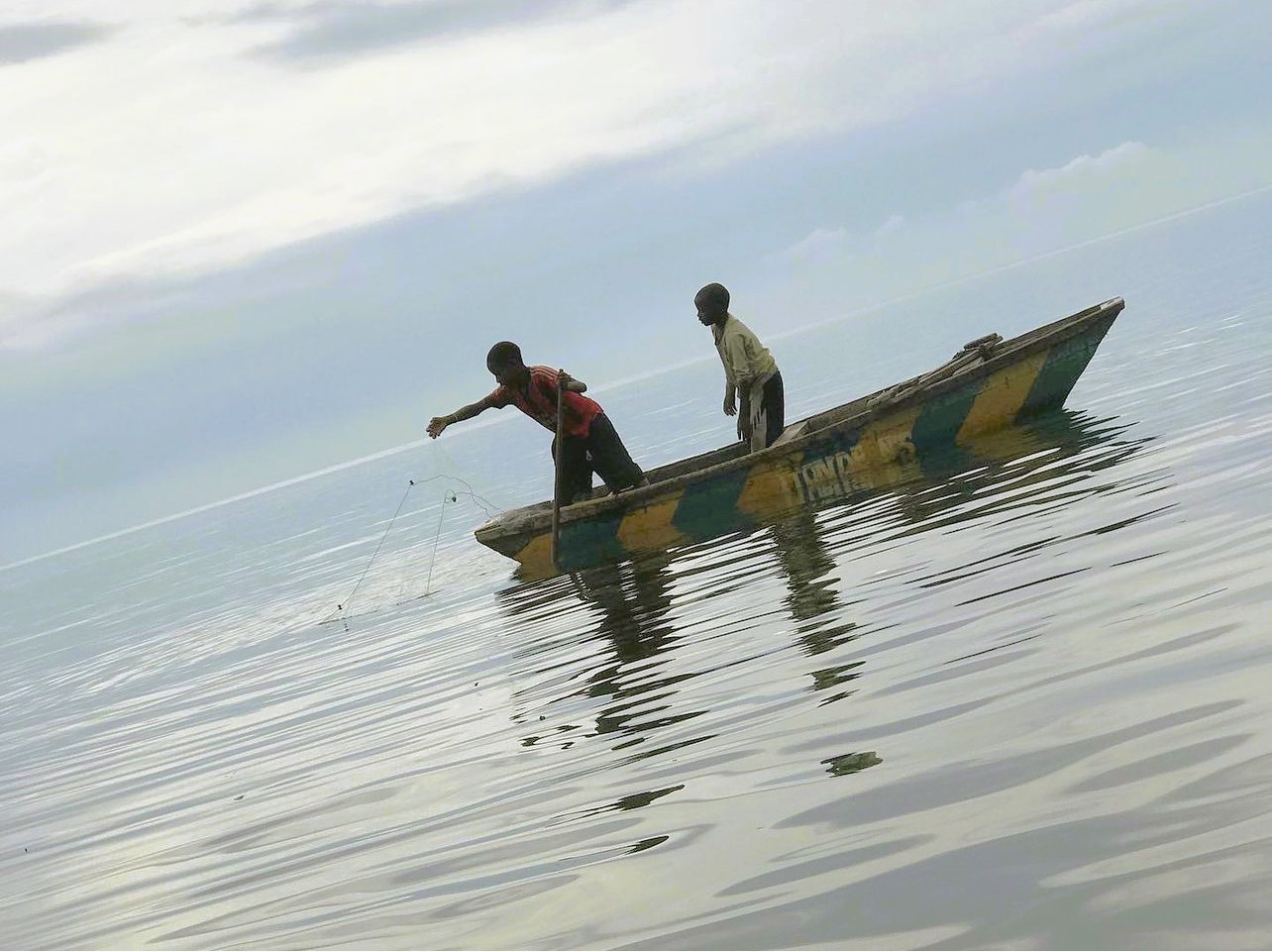
Young fishermen in Mulongwe

Due to Uvira's close location to Lake Tanganyika, the world's second-deepest lake and a source of rich aquatic life, fishing has developed as a primary economic activity, supporting around 1% of residents directly or indirectly. This sector involves local communities, including the Vira, Fuliru, and Bembe, who cultivate various fish types such as tilapia, catfish, kapenta (referred to locally as ndakala or sambaza), protopterus (locally called njombo), Astatotilapia burtoni (or Kijoli), clarias (known as kambale), Tanganyika killifish, sleek lates (regionally called mukeke), Lake Tanganyika sprat (Stolothrissa tanganicae), and Nile perch. Of these, Stolothrissa constitutes up to 80% of the total catch in the northern basin of the lake. These species are central to artisanal fishing operations and broader fisheries shared with Burundi and Tanzania.

Fishing contributes to food security, alleviating malnutrition, and improving the nutritional status of communities, particularly those living in rural areas or in nearby cities and towns such as Sange, Luvungi, and Kiliba. It also provides significant income-generating opportunities for farmers and entrepreneurs, who sell their fish products in notable markets such as Marché Maendeleo, Marché Kalimabenge, and Marché Mulongwe.

Uvira is also home to the Centre de Recherche en Hydrobiologie (CRH-Uvira), a leading institution dedicated to the scientific study of freshwater ecosystems. Founded on 26 May 1950 as the Centre de Recherche Scientifique du Tanganyika under the auspices of the Belgian Institut de Recherche Scientifique en Afrique Centrale (IRSAC), the center conducts research on the biology, ecology, and conservation of aquatic life in Lake Tanganyika.

Family-based livestock breeding is widespread in Uvira. Historical records from 1900 counted 105 head of large stock and 195 of small stock in the city, while Luberizi in Uvira Territory registered 81 and 53, and Bukavu 76 and 43, respectively. Common livestock includes cattle, goats, sheep, and pigs. Poultry farming is also prevalent, with nearly every family in the city engaged in rearing chickens, turkeys, rabbits, guinea pigs, and other fowl.

=== Craftsmanship ===
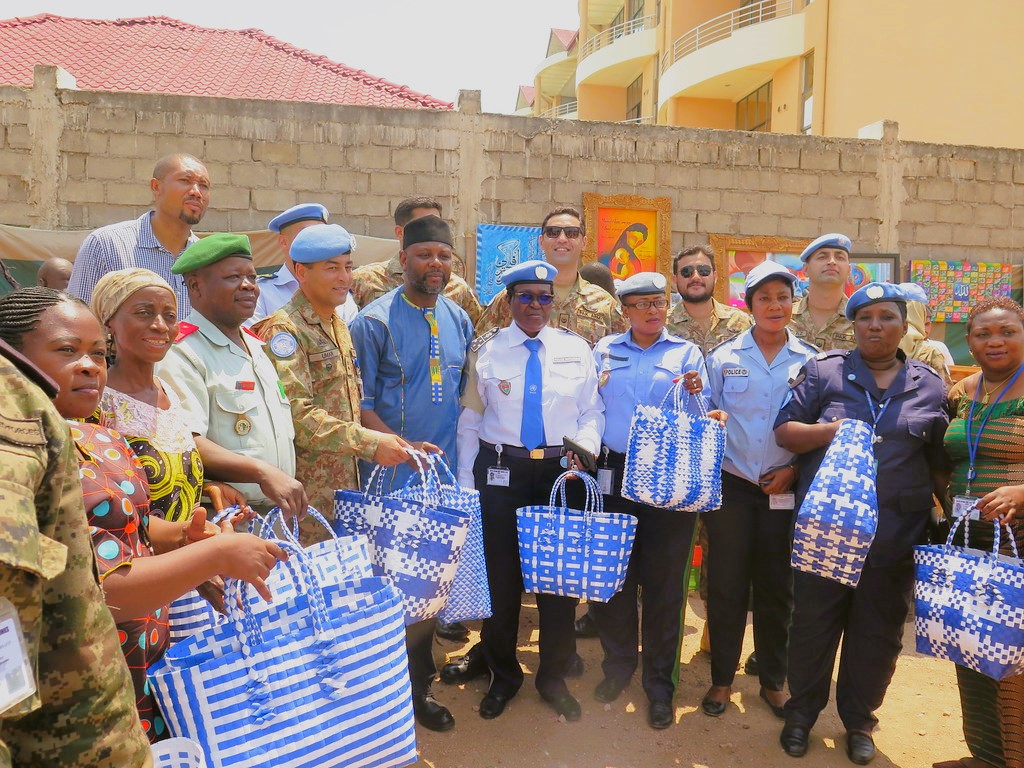
A small art market in Uvira

The area is renowned for its cultural heritage and craftsmanship, with locals producing a diverse range of handcrafted goods that include carpentry, joinery, masonry, tailoring, shoemaking, and bicycle taxi services. In addition, they excel in woodworking, pottery, basket weaving, metalwork, and textile production.

=== Financial sector ===
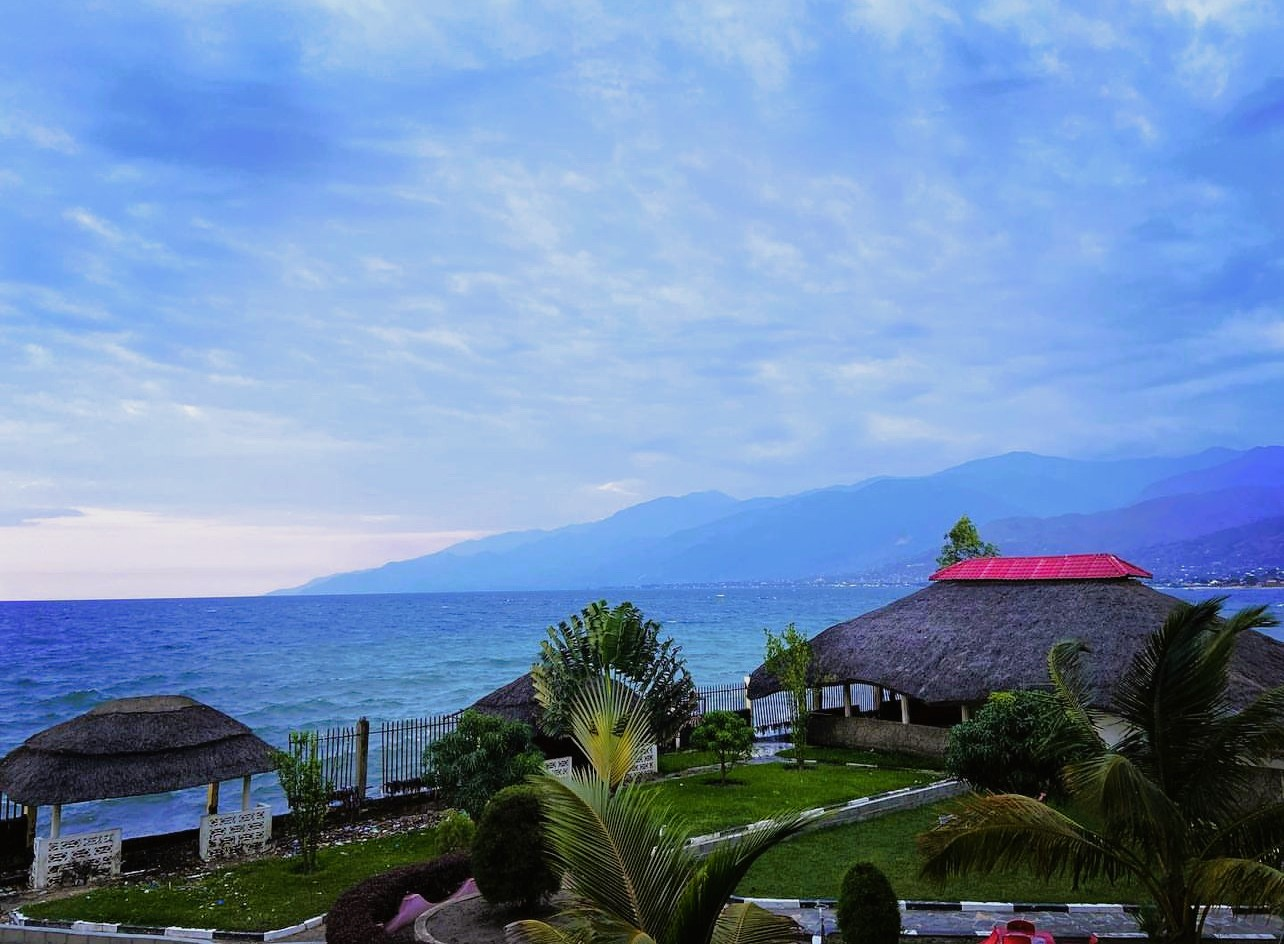
A scene from Uvira

The microfinance institutions have experienced significant development since the 1990s, especially in response to rising poverty levels. This growth aligns with broader trends in the DRC, where the first microfinance initiatives appeared as early as 1969 in Mbuji-Mayi with cooperative savings institutions. South Kivu has witnessed a continuous expansion of microfinance activities, led primarily by development NGOs and private financial institutions. These actors, inspired by models like the Grameen Bank, have sought to mobilize internal and external resources to offer credit services to underserved populations. The emergence of various microfinance institutions (MFIs), mutual solidarity funds, and decentralized financial systems (systèmes financiers décentralisés; SFDs), both formal and semi-formal, has created a dynamic environment for promoting credit-based development. In Uvira, such services are especially targeted toward farmers and informal entrepreneurs, with an emphasis on poverty alleviation and local economic stimulation. Institutions involved include cooperatives, microcredit companies, and specialized savings societies, each overseen by the Central Bank of the Congo and categorized by the scale and purpose of their financial services.

The microfinance institution COOPEC–Kalundu, which seeks to provide grant loans and encourage savings among its members, is based in the Songo neighborhood along Main Road No. 5, Alpha Avenue, in Kalundu, Uvira. The city is also home to a PAIDEK branch.

== Demographics ==
Uvira is home to a diverse population consisting of native ethnic groups of Bantu origin, including Vira, Fuliiru, Bembe, Zoba, Lega, Shi, Nyindu, Luba and Bangubangu. The city also hosts a significant expatriate community from countries including Burundi, Rwanda, Zambia, Tanzania, Belgium, France, Sweden, China, and India. Among the native groups, the Vira, who speak Kivira, predominantly occupy the Bavira Chiefdom from Makobola to Kawizi. The Fuliiru predominantly inhabit the mountainous terrains along the Uvira-Bukavu road corridor and represent the majority in the northern regions, whereas the Bembe predominantly reside in the southern sectors of Uvira, encompassing the Kakungwe, Kimanga, and Kalundu.

Uvira consists of 14 neighborhoods (quartiers), with Kakombe having the highest population density. It had a workforce of 24,407 residents as of 2014, accounting for 12.5% of the city's total population. Mulongwe and Kibondwe neighborhoods had the second and third-highest populations, with 20,531 and 3,687 inhabitants, respectively. The 2014 civil status statistics for Uvira's neighborhoods (quartiers):

Neighborhoods (quartiers)		Population
1.	Kabindula	14,306
2.	Kakombe	24,174
3.	Kalundu	23,549
4.	Kasenga	19,449
5.	Kavimvira	19,549
6.	Kibondwe	4,947
7.	Kilibula	9,320
8.	Kimanga	13,656
9.	Mulongwe	22,998
10.	Nyamianda	11,230
11.	Rombe I	20,832
12.	Rombe II	16,046
13.	Rugenge	6,185
14.	Songo	19,118

The preponderance of Uvira's residents are nationals, with a workforce tallying 194,669 people, equating to 99.8% of the populace. Foreign nationals constitute just 0.2%, with most of them residing in Kilibula, which accommodates 26.7% of the expatriate demographic. Burundians form the largest foreign contingent, comprising 55.2%, followed by Rwandans at approximately 37.5%. In Mulongwe, the workforce shows near gender parity, with approximately 98,390 women and 96,696 men. As of 2009, the city's population was estimated at 171,409, including 484 foreign residents.

=== Religion ===
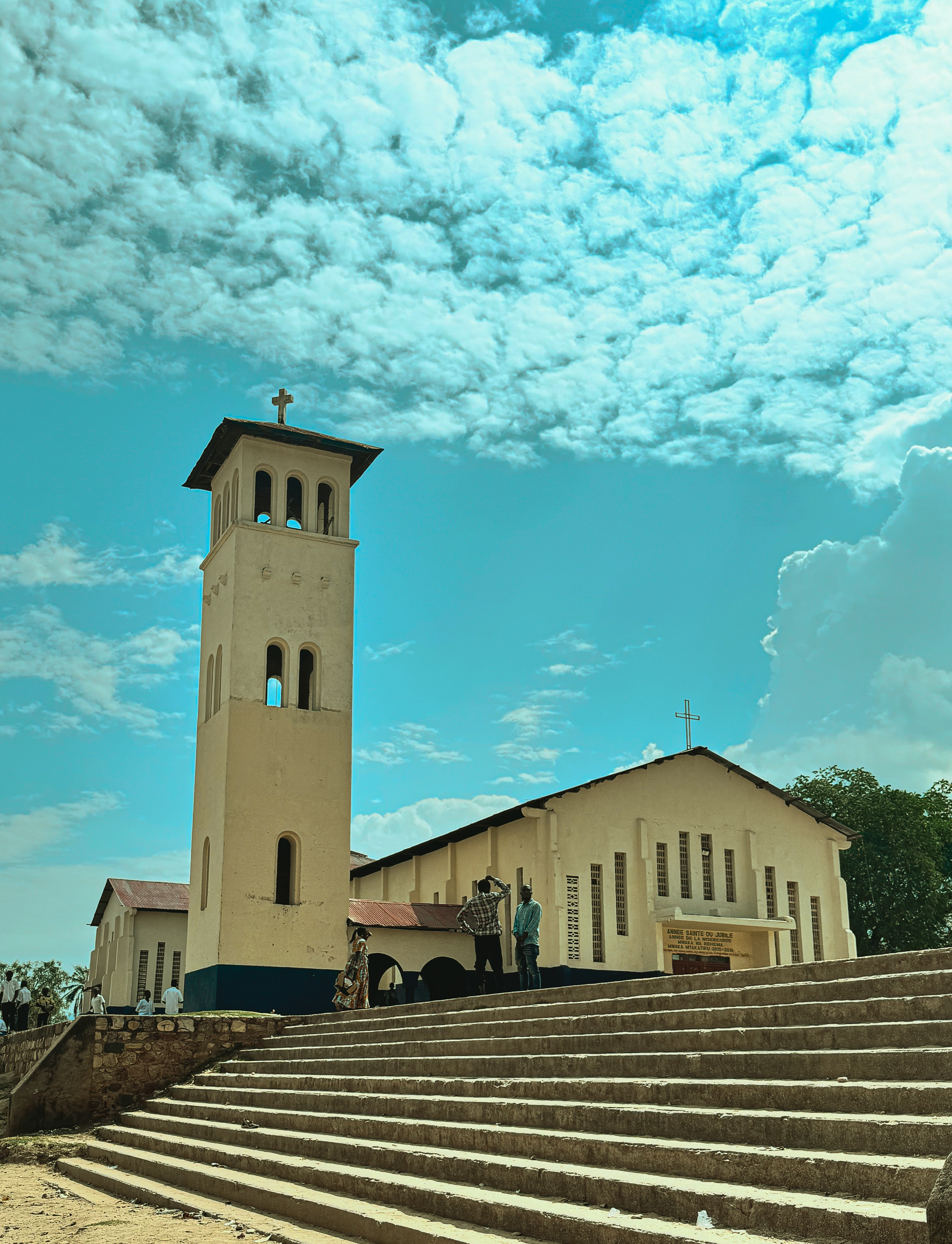
Cathédrale Saint-Paul d'Uvira

Uvira is predominantly Christian. The Roman Catholic Church housed the episcopal seat of the Diocese of Uvira alongside its cathedral and 18 parochial jurisdictions. Protestant Christianity is represented by diverse sects such as Pentecostals, Free Methodist Church, the Communauté Baptiste au Centre de l'Afrique (CBCA), the Communauté des Églises Libres de Pentecôte en Afrique (CELPA), Missões Evangelísticas Vinde Amados Meus (MEVAM), Church of the Dominators, and Seventh-day Adventist Church. There is also a notable presence of revivalist congregations and restorationist movements, including Jehovah's Witnesses.

The Kimbanguist Church constitutes a significant component of the city's religious makeup, alongside a small Muslim community and other religious entities such as the Church of "Dieu Poisson", colloquially referred to as Mayebo.

=== Education ===
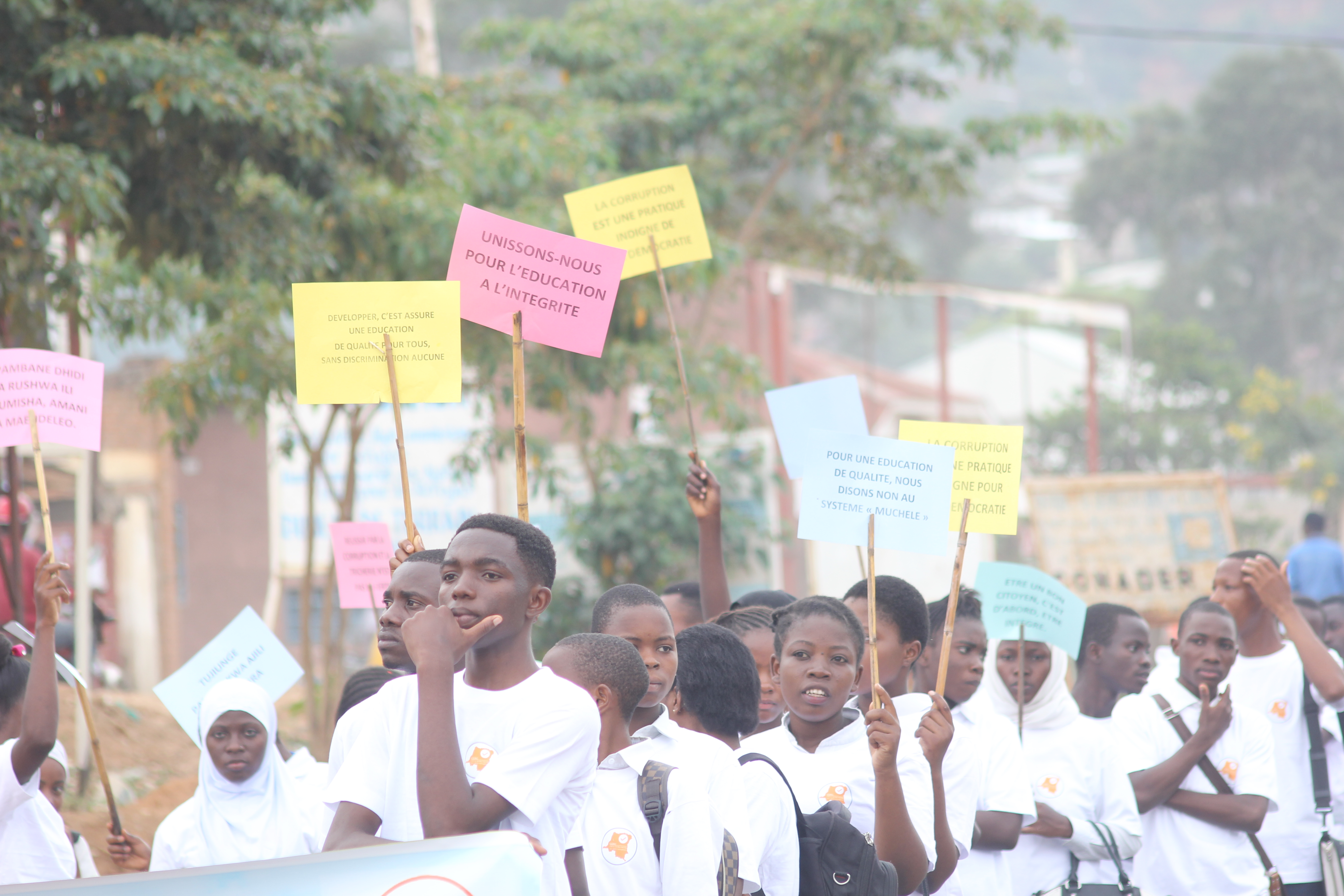
Students in Uvira participate in a march against corruption in education as part of the International Anti-Corruption Day commemorations.

Education includes primary, secondary, and higher education. The city has many public, private, and conventional schools, along with several higher education institutions..

Uvira hosts several secondary schools (instituts), many of which are conventioned with religious organizations, particularly the Catholic Church. These schools offer both general and specialized secondary education. They prepare students for the Diplôme d'État and help them continue their studies at university.

Institut Mwanga d'Uvira
Institut Zawadi Ya Rais
Institut Kalundu
Institut Nuru
Institut Lumbimbi
Institut Kasenga
Institut du Lac/Kavimvira
Institut Kitundu
Institut Mgr Guido Maria Conforti
Institut Notre Dame Aux Larmes

Primary education is provided through stand-alone primary schools (écoles primaires, EP) and integrated school complexes (complexes scolaires, CS). Notable examples include:

EP Muhe
EP Lukula
CS Nuru
CS Action Kusaidia
CS Maranatha
CS Amani
EP Kalundu
EP Kanvivira
EP Lumbimbi
EP Kasenga
EP Les Anges
EP Munanira

Uvira is also home to institutions of higher learning, including teacher training colleges, higher technical institutes (Instituts supérieurs techniques; IST), higher pedagogical institutes (Instituts supérieurs pédagogiques; ISP), and university extensions. These include Université Notre Dame de Tanganyika (UNDT), Institut Supérieur de Développement Rural d'Uvira (ISDR-Uvira), Institut Supérieur de Technique Médical (ISTM-Uvira), Institut Supérieur de Commerce (ISC-Uvira), Institut Supérieur des Technologies et de Commerce (ISTEC), and Institut Supérieur Pédagogique d'Uvira (ISP-Uvira).

=== Health ===
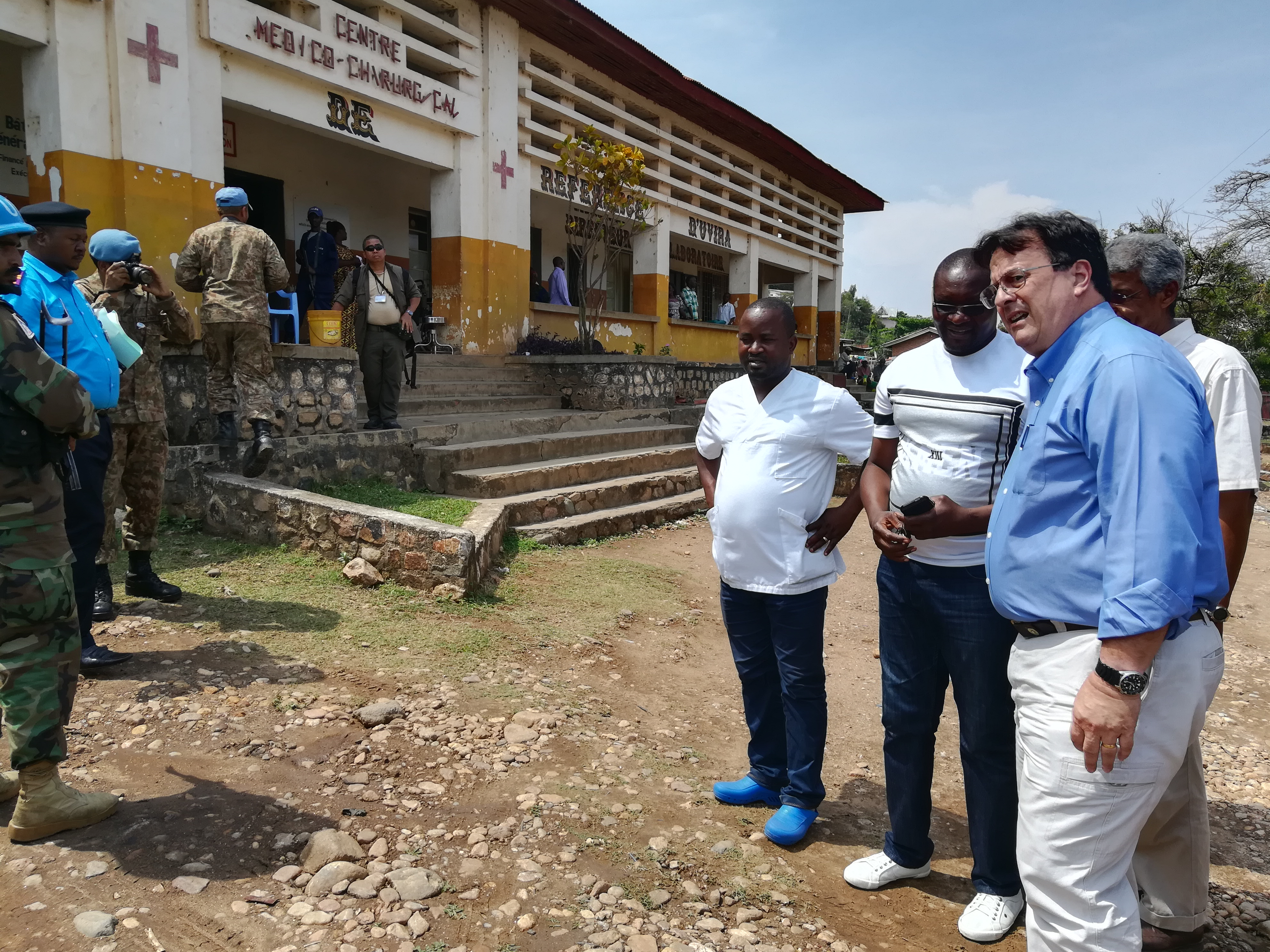
Uvira General Reference Hospital

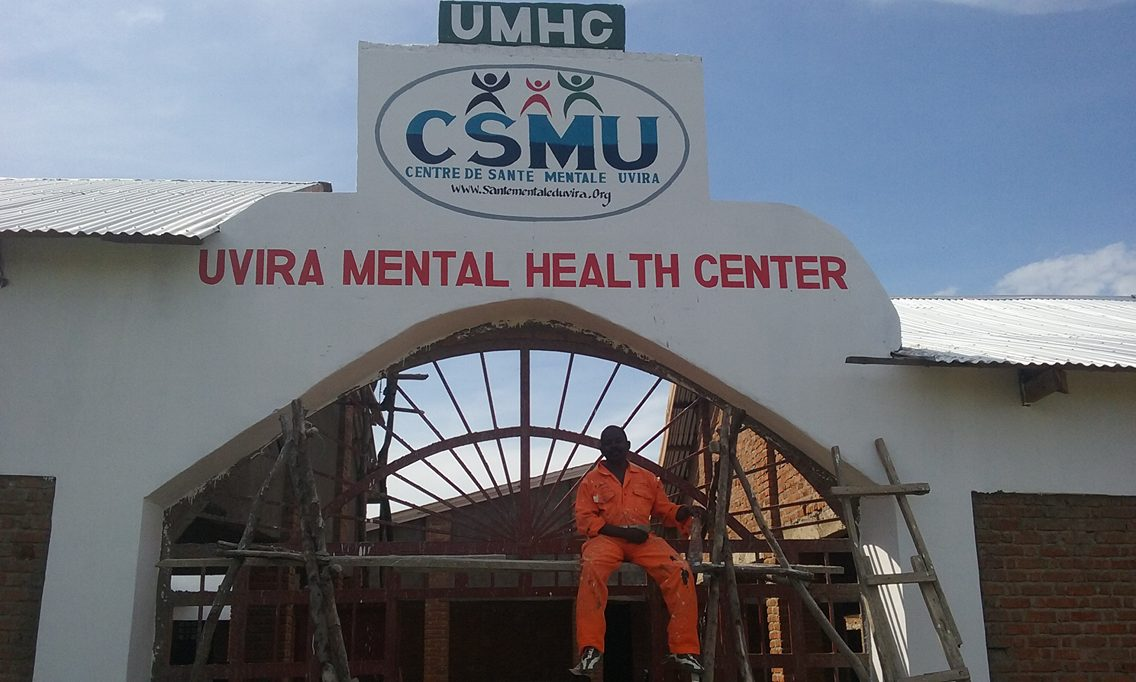
Uvira Mental Health Center

Healthcare is centered on the state-run Hôpital Général de Référence d'Uvira, which is the city's main healthcare facility. The city also has four private and church-run polyclinics, 17 community health centers, 26 dispensaries, and roughly 100 private pharmacies. Four therapeutic nutrition centers provide support with funding from the European Union and other international NGOs, under the supervision of Caritas Internationalis, the Bureau Central de Zone de Santé (BCZS), and Action Against Hunger (ACF). Other notable health facilities include Hôpital Général de Référence de Kasenga, Rutasoka Clinic, Saint Luc, CSDT Kavimvira, and Uvira Mental Health Center (Centre de Santé Mentale d'Uvira, also known as Centre National pour le Bien-être Émotionnel).

== Infrastructure ==
=== Transport ===
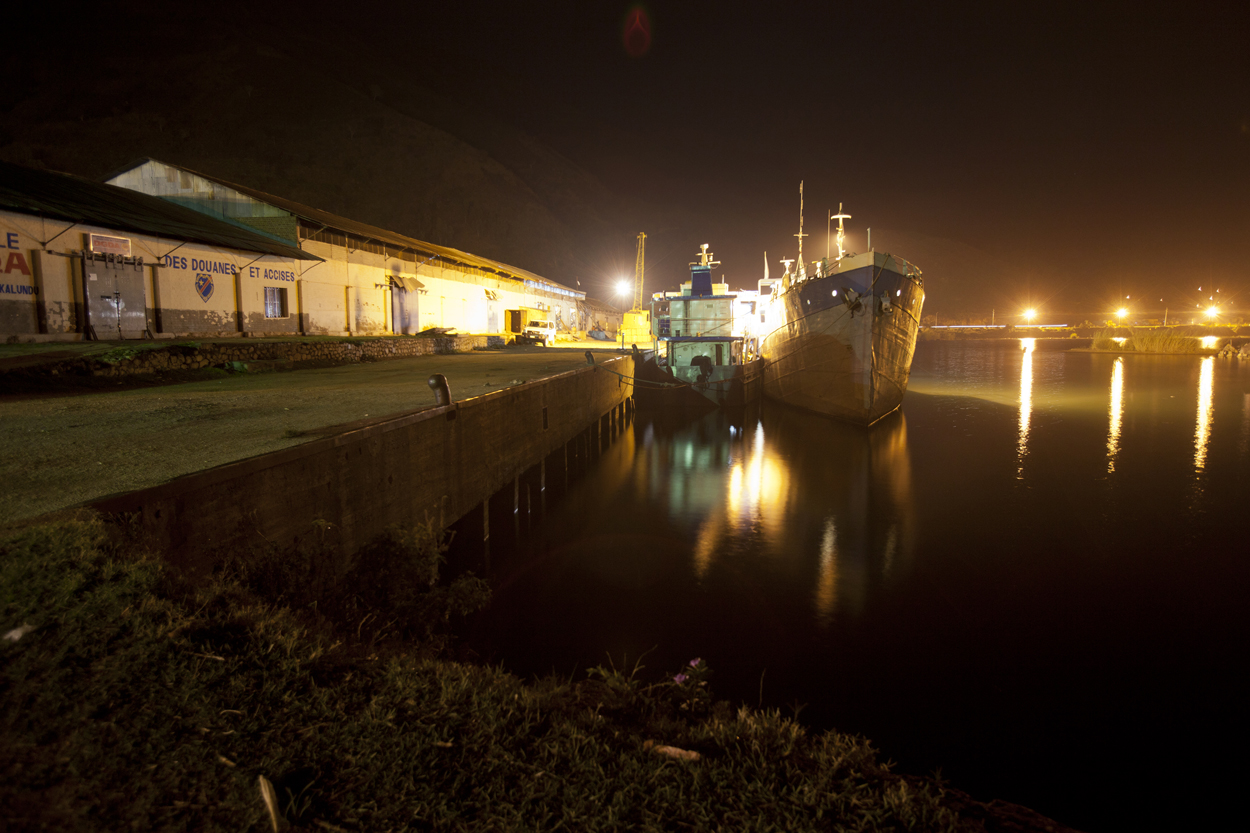
The Uruguayan Riverine Company (URPAC) of MONUSCO patrols Lake Tanganyika and conducts joint training with the FARDC Navy aboard the vessel UN-12 between Uvira and Baraka.

The city's strategic location facilitates trade with Burundi, Tanzania, Zambia, Rwanda, Bukavu, Kalemie, and Fizi Territory. Local residents are involved in trade, commuting, and freight transport, while major markets include Marché de Kalundu, Marché Maendeleo, Marché Kalimabenge, Soko Congolese (also known by its former name Marché Zaïrois), Marché de Kasenga, Marché de Kanvimvira, Marché Tumaini Africa, Marché Kunzira, Marché de Kilomoni, and Marché de Frontière. The lake route connects Uvira with Burundi, Tanzania, and Zambia across Lake Tanganyika, while overland routes link it with Bukavu, Bujumbura, and Kalemie through Fizi Territory.

=== Energy ===
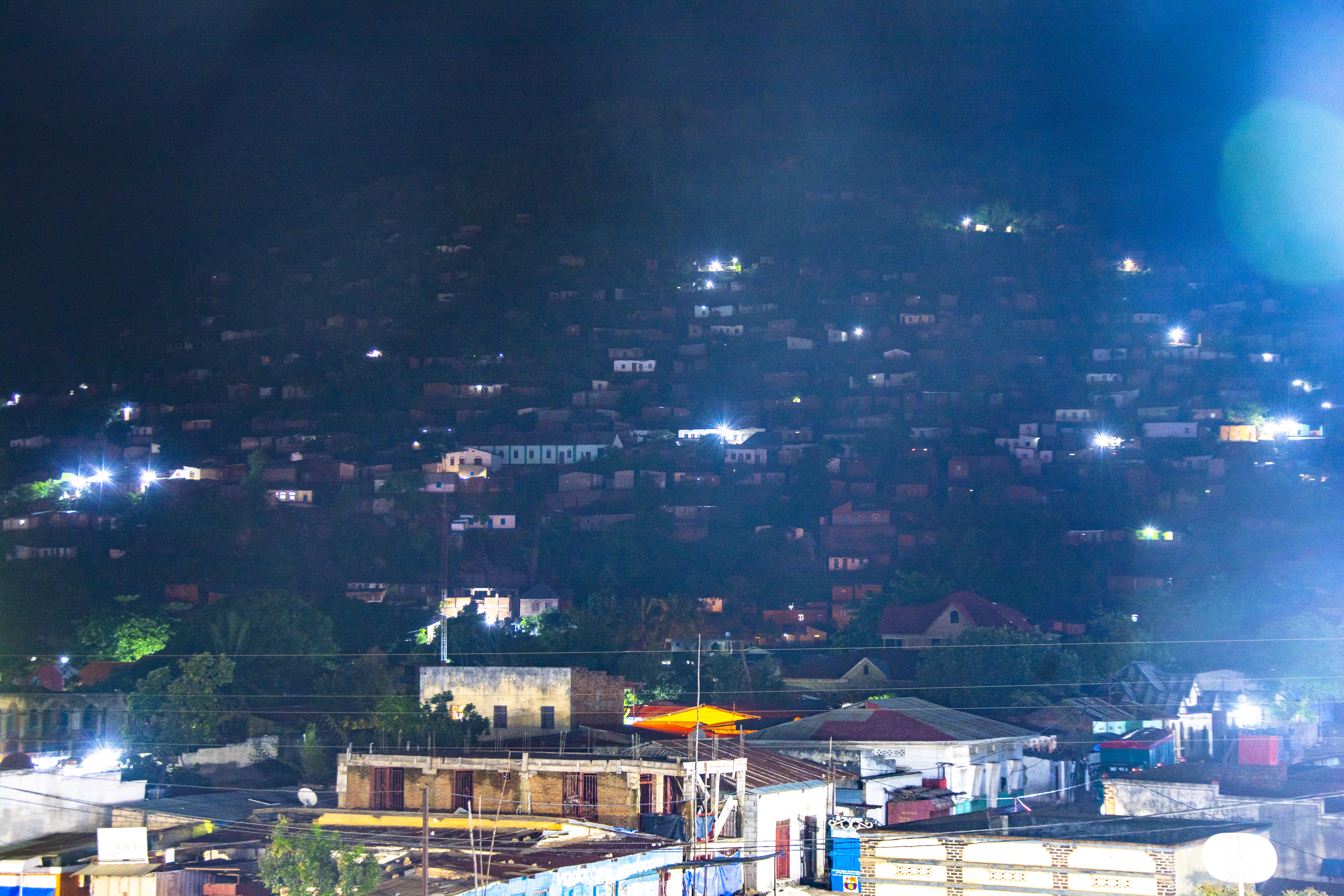
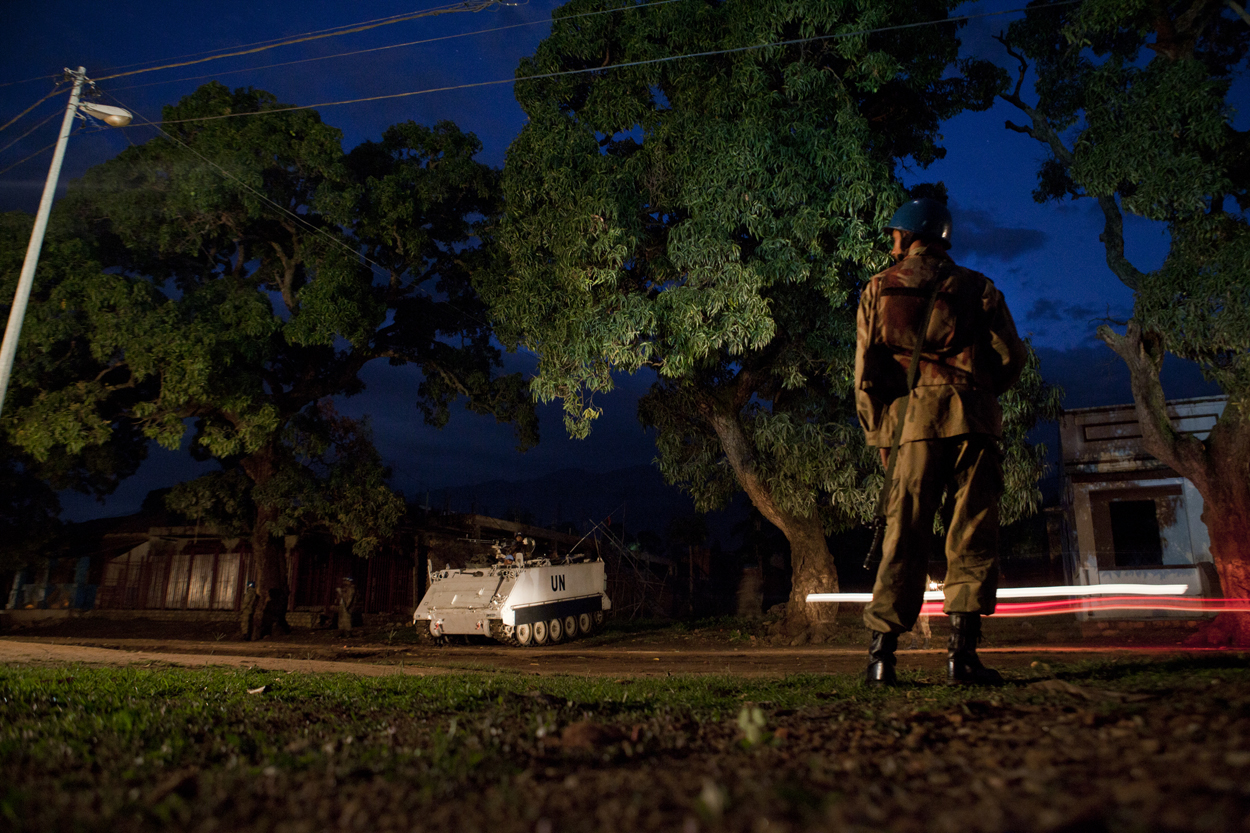
Uvira at night

Uvira primarily receives electricity from the Ruzizi hydroelectric plant in Bukavu, but the supply is insufficient for the growing population. This often causes power outages that force many residents to rely on kerosene lamps, generators, charcoal, firewood, and wood shavings. While these alternatives are easy to access, they also damage the environment by increasing deforestation and air pollution.

Most petroleum products used in Uvira are transported by tanker trucks from Kenya, particularly from Kisumu, Eldoret, and Mombasa. Although the DRC has petroleum reserves, especially in Kongo Central, much of its crude oil is exported for refining abroad, which increases the country's dependence on imported fuel and puts pressure on its trade balance.

According to the 2011 report of the hydrocarbons service in Uvira, 24 service stations were recorded, though only a portion remain operational today due to closures or ongoing rehabilitation. Among the key facilities are three barge tankers:

No.	Owner	Operator	Management	Installed capacity (m^{3})	Compartments	Commissioned	Status
1.	GINKI	GINKI	Private	624	9	2010	In service
2.	Kalonda	Société nationale des chemins de fer du Congo	Public	120	1	—	In service
3.	Mvua	Société nationale des chemins de fer du Congo	Public	900	4	—	Not in service

The informal sector is essential in the local distribution network. Vendors operating outside formal channels, commonly called Kadhafi, are active across Uvira. This nickname originated during the Second Republic when a significant portion of petroleum was imported from Libya.

=== Media ===
Uvira hosts a range of radio stations, including one public broadcaster, several community outlets, and two privately owned stations. Among them are RTNC-Uvira, Radio Le Messager du Peuple, Radio Notre-Dame du Tanganika (RNDT), Radio-Télévision Communautaire Mitumba (RTCM), RCUF (which rebroadcasts Radio Top Congo), Radio Methononia FM, Radio Ngoma ya Uvira, Radio Tuungane, and Radio Télévision Lukula. The RTNC substation often airs programs originating from Kinshasa. Alongside Radio Okapi, residents also tune in to various international channels. Television access is limited to one local station, Shahidi TV (affiliated with Radio Le Messager du Peuple), though RTNC, Digital Congo, and Burundian channels can also be received.

Print journalism is underdeveloped, as outlets like Les Lundi and Uvira News Home Magazine have ceased operations. The bulletin of the Agence congolaise de presse (ACP), published in French in Kinshasa, is distributed locally through its Uvira office.

=== Water supply challenges ===
The city's water infrastructure, originally built in 1958, suffered extensive damage during the First Congo War, leaving the majority of Uvira's residents reliant on unsafe water sources. Before recent upgrades, only 30% of residents had intermittent access to piped water, with most households resorting to rivers (62%), public taps (53%), or Lake Tanganyika (34%) for water according to household surveys conducted in 2016–2017. Water treatment practices remained minimal, with only 6% of households reporting any form of water purification. Free residual chlorine, a critical indicator of water safety, was detected in merely 8% of household water samples, predominantly from piped supplies.

Sanitation infrastructure was similarly inadequate, with no centralized wastewater management system in place. Households rely predominantly on shared latrines (41%), private outdoor latrines (27%), or engage in open defecation (20%).

The French Development Agency (AFD), the Veolia Foundation (VF), and REGIDESO launched a comprehensive water infrastructure improvement project in 2014. It encompassed significant upgrades to the city's water supply system, including the refurbishment of the primary water intake on the Mulongwe River, modernization of water treatment and pumping stations, construction of a 1,600-m³ storage tank in the southern sector, and development of a piped distribution network with household connections. Key improvements included the expansion of the water treatment plant's capacity through advanced coagulation, flocculation, sand filtration, and chlorination processes. A new 2,000-m³ storage tank was constructed in the city's northern area, and 24 kilometers of new water pipes were installed alongside the rehabilitation of 10 kilometers of existing pipes. The project initially targeted the installation of 115 new community taps and the establishment or rehabilitation of 2,997 private water connections. Between September 2019 and December 2021, significant progress was achieved, with 56 community taps installed, 1,191 new private connections established, and 717 existing connections rehabilitated. By the conclusion of the extended initiative, 2,368 private connections and 93 community taps had been rendered operational.

=== Environmental issues ===
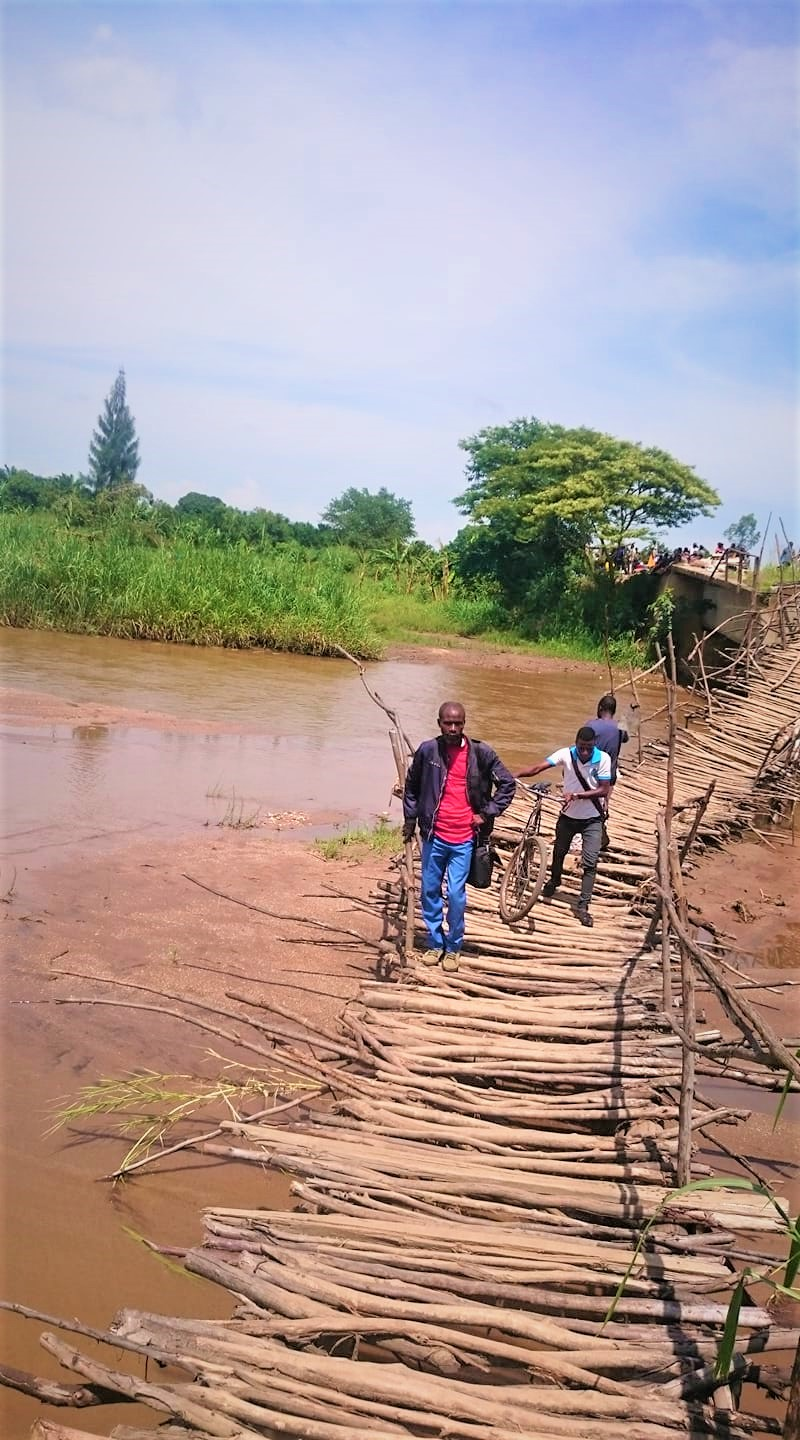
Sange Bridge following the 2020 torrential rainfall

On 17 April 2020, torrential downpours triggered deadly flooding that killed 24 people as the Mulongwe River overflowed. Mountain runoff inundated major streets and National Road No. 5, while official records reported damage to 3,500 homes and UM News, the United Methodist Church's official news outlet, reported nearly 70,000 displaced people. The floods also damaged major bridges at Runingu and Sange.

From February 2024, rising water levels in Lake Tanganyika and overflowing rivers, including the Mulongwe, Kalimabenge, Kamvimvira, and Kabimba, caused flooding in Uvira. Flooding affected Kalundu, Namianda, Kimanga, Rombe I, Rombe II, Kakombe, Kilibula, Kasenga, Kabimba, and Kanvinvira. By April 2024, more than 6,861 households, representing over 34,358 internally displaced people, had been affected. Of these, 6,530 households stayed with host families, while 331 were relocated to collective centers. The floods affected more than 2,800 homes, 17 primary schools, 20 secondary schools, 7 nursery schools, 3 universities, and 9 local churches. Public water infrastructure was also damaged, leaving more than 800 water taps unusable. Five major markets, including Marché de Frontière, Marché Tumaini Africa, Marché Kunzira, Marché Zaïrois, and Marché Maendeleo, were flooded. Key transport and trade hubs, including the ports of Kalundu and Kasenga and Maendeleo Beach, were also submerged. More than 120 hectares of farmland were flooded.

== Culture ==
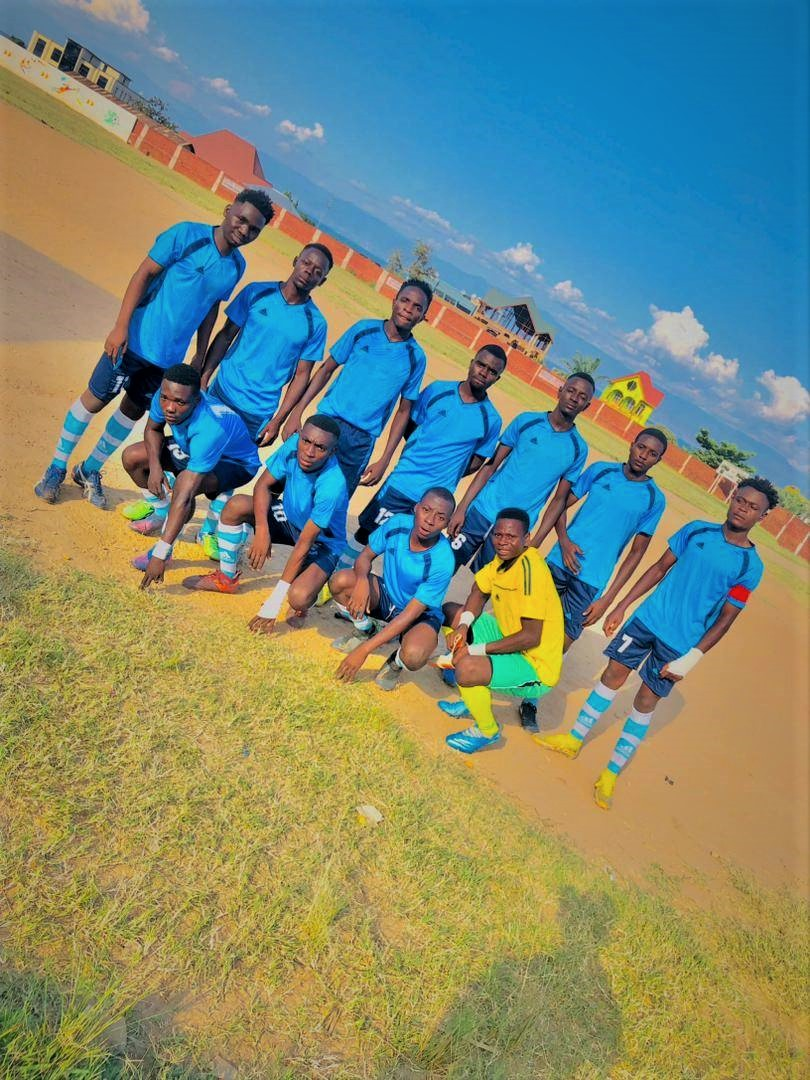
Stade de l'Unité d'Uvira

Uvira has two basketball courts, several football fields, and two main stadiums: Stade de l'Unité d'Uvira and Stade Epanza. The stadiums host football matches, athletics competitions, political campaigns, public gatherings, and other events. The city also has three women's football teams.

Recreational venues include the Baraza la Parokya, the chapel school, and the hall at Mulongwe Parish. Other leisure facilities include bars, clubs, cabarets, and bistros. Lakeside recreational areas include Saga I and Saga II beaches.

== See also ==
- AS Maïka
