= Deaf theology =

Theological perspective

Deaf theology is a modern theological perspective that frames theological issues through a Deaf lens. The scope of Deaf theology is mostly Christian, however, a minority of Deaf theologians are of different faith groups. Deaf Christianity ranges from conservative to progressive.

Historically, theologians did not consider perspectives from Deaf people as equal. This was due in part to the fact that American Sign Language was not formally recognized as a "true" language until William Stokoe was able to advocate for language recognition in the 1960s. Early discussion studying Deaf people and theology was created by hearing scholars. However, in recent years, more Deaf theologians have been making the public aware of their existence in the greater Deaf community. Originally, Deaf theological discussion mostly occurred in Deaf church spaces with some Deaf people entering ministry. Over time however, as more Deaf people became knowledgeable about religion and theological topics, a greater spectrum of Deaf thought started taking hold.

Early leaders in the Deaf community such as Thomas Hopkins Gallaudet earned credentials in theology leading them, because of their faith, to establish Deaf institutions of learning in the United States on the basis of charity. Deaf theology focuses on independence, as its own perspective on Deafness and religion by embracing Deaf identity rather than attempting to integrate Deaf people into hearing religious life.

== Christian deaf theology ==
Christian Deaf theology has evolved significantly over time. In the past, hearing theologians notably worked with Deaf students to teach them language. Later, after signed languages were more standardized in the 19th and 20th centuries Deaf people developed theological perspectives of their own. Historically, Deaf people have faced exclusion from traditional church spaces dating back to the Apostolic Canons. The canons stated that deaf and blind people were not allowed to be bishops. Despite this Deaf people still worked with hearing theologians as students. Deaf theologians were eventually able to work in ministry and in church spaces after signed languages started to be understood as a legitimate means of conveying thoughts and ideas.

In an account recorded by Bede, John of Beverley, an English bishop and saint, is widely regarded to be the first teacher of the Deaf. He taught a Deaf pupil orally in the 7th century. John's student was known to not have been particularly articulate. Sometime later after John had begun teaching him, the student was prompted to say a few words and he was able to, this appeared to be a miracle to both John and Bede as Deaf people at the time were generally assumed to not have been able to learn language in this manner.

Saint Augustine used the example of Deaf people in De Magistro to illustrate that he believed signs could not receive worship. Later Deaf scholars hypothesized that Saint Augustine believed that the Deaf could receive the same worship as hearing people.

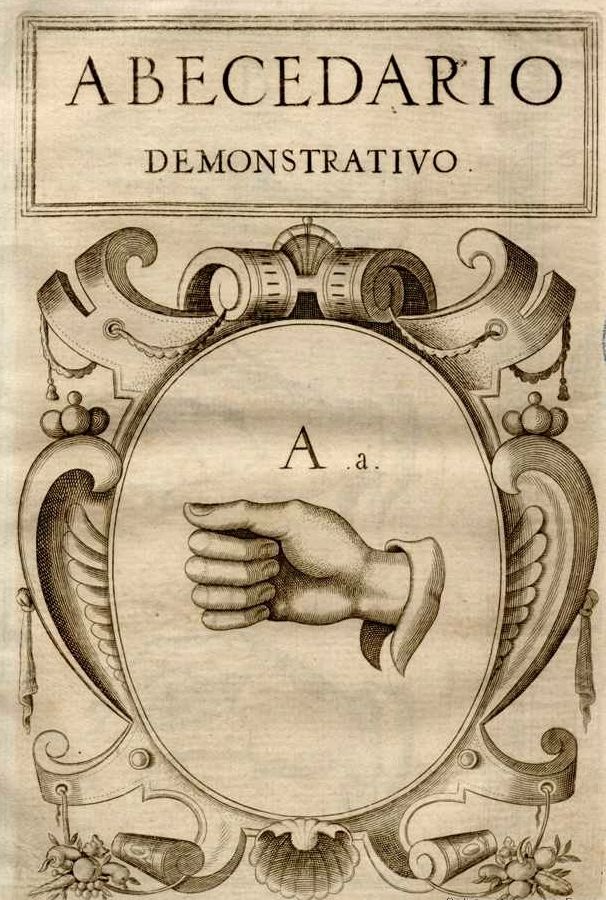
'A' handshape demonstrated in a book by Priest Juan Pablo Bonet, 1620.

=== Renaissance ===
Pedro Ponce de León, a Spanish Benedictine Monk is considered by many to be the first formal teacher of the deaf. He started working with deaf students in 1546 and possibly developed one of the first manual alphabets.

=== Early modern period ===
Juan Pablo Bonet, a Spanish priest wrote Reducción de las letras y arte para enseñar a hablar a los mudos (Summary of the letters and the art of teaching speech to the mute). This was the first book to document a signed language, additionally it showed that modern signed alphabets potentially have roots in Monastic sign languages.

Linguist, William Stokoe observed what he believed was a difference in class between the deaf students taught before 1700 and after. That those taught before 1700 were typically of the "bourgeoisie" social class. He argues that there was likely a separate signing system happening at the same time given there were people who were signing that almost certainly would not have been in contact with the upper class.

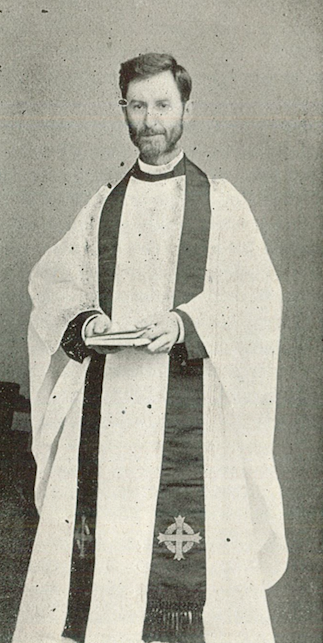
Henry Winter Syle by Unknown

=== 18th-19th century ===
There were numerous factors leading to the creation of Deaf theology. One of the factors was that Deaf educators Charles-Michel de l'Épée, Thomas Hopkins Gallaudet, and Thomas Gallaudet (priest) were all interested in theology. L'Épée started teaching Deaf people to provide them with the sacraments. The first Deaf church in the United States was founded in 1852. In 1881 the Episcopal Church established the Conference of Church Workers Among the Deaf. This organization was intended for members of clergy. Later the group reorganized in 1961 to shift the focus more to ordinary Deaf churchgoers.

By 1883, Henry Winter Syle was ordained as a priest in the Episcopal Church in the United States. He was the first Deaf man to become a clergyman in the United States. Syle was heavily influenced by Thomas Gallaudet (priest). In England, in 1885, Richard Aslatt Pearce became the first Deaf clergyman in the Church of England. Notably, Pearce started gathering Deaf adults together for worship on Sundays. Syle began gathering Deaf adults together by establishing a congregation in 1888.

Additionally, in 1885 the Calvary Baptist Church of the Deaf (then known as the Calvary Baptist Church Mission for the Deaf) was established in Washington, DC. It was the second mission for the Deaf in Washington. The church was also the first baptist mission specifically centered on the Deaf in America. The mission used hearing interpreters to display the sermons. Amos Kendall donated money for the construction of the original church building in 1862 and additionally donated more money after a fire destroyed the original building in 1864.

In 1896, the Christ Church of the Deaf, a Methodist church located in Baltimore was granted a charter. Rev. Daniel Moylan who was himself Deaf, was inspired to start the mission after being rejected from Catholic and Episcopal spaces due to his deafness.

=== 20th century ===
In 1905 Rev. Moylan established the Whatcoat Colored Mission. This mission was a church specifically for Black Deaf people. Originally, both the Whatcoat Colored Mission and the Christ Church for the Deaf were segregated and they remained segregated throughout Moylans lifetime. Later, both churches would integrate.

The first Deaf minister practicing in the Calvary Baptist Church of the Deaf was Arthur D. Bryant. Bryant was a graduate of Gallaudet University (then the National Deaf-Mute College), in 1880 he obtained a degree in Philosophy. Following his graduation, he became a professor in art and drawing after Edward Miner Gallaudet offered him a teaching position. He stayed in that position as a professor until 1911. Bryant started leading in the Calvary church in 1908 and he was ordained as a minister in 1911. After becoming ordained, he left his teaching position to center his focus onto the church and ministry. Gallaudet University (then Gallaudet College) awarded him with an honorary Master of Divinity in 1932. The school additionally intended to award him with an honorary Doctor of Divinity in 1939 however he died a month prior to the graduation. They made the decision to award him the degree posthumously.

In some contexts learning sign language was encouraged for Ministers. This was encouraged at a point in time where sign language had been largely banned in the classroom due to the Milan Conference.

The Christian Mission for the Deaf was started in 1956 by Andrew Foster. The goal of the organization was to bring religion, spirituality, and education to Deaf children in African nations. Ultimately, Foster opened a total of 31 Deaf schools and churches.

Discussion of how to best include Deaf people in theological spaces continued through the 1970s.

=== Liberation Movement ===
Deaf liberation theology is a modern theological perspective which originated among Deaf theologians and scholars. A sub-field of liberation theology, it contextualizes Christianity in an attempt to try and help Deaf scholars understand their faith in a largely hearing world.

Deaf liberation theology largely focuses on framing Christian theology as a tool Deaf people can use to resist oppression stemming from audism. Additionally, the perspective views Deaf people as an oppressed linguistic minority. Deaf people are often excluded from traditional church spaces and sermons due to a lack of interpreters, as well as stigmatization and prejudice. As a result, Deaf liberation theology has a focus on how Deaf people can organize and experience faith in an environment that is more welcoming and accepting from a Deaf perspective.

The emergence of Deaf liberation theology as a topic dates to March 1985 when a group of 10 hearing and Deaf theologians gathered at the Claggett Retreat Center in Maryland to write “a statement of our shared faith, hurts, and hopes”. This statement later became known as the Claggett Statement. This document was also simultaneously made available signed in ASL. Attendees at the retreat were of varied denominations representing Catholic, Mennonite, and Protestant faith groups. Some people who attended used American Sign Language while others used English. Interpreters were utilized to help dissolve communication barriers that arose.

In 2003 a conference was held at to discuss Deaf liberation theology Catholic University of Leuven. This event proposed the idea of Deaf Theology as a unique progressive Christian movement and separated it from being grouped into existing movements as it had been previously.

In 2004, theologian Roger Hitchling wrote about the relationship of Deaf people to the Church in The Church And Deaf People: A Study Of Identity, Communication And Relationships With Special Reference To The Ecclesiology Of Jürgen Moltmann.

This work went on to inspire other authors such as Hannah Lewis to write Deaf Liberation Theology in 2007. These works helped solidify the legitimacy of Deaf theology as both an academic field and a lived experience. Lewis highlighted how certain changes needed to be made to places of worship to allow them to be more accommodating to Deaf individuals. One of these concepts she advocated for the inclusion of was DeafSpace.

After this, in 2008, author Wayne Morris wrote Theology without words: theology in the deaf community: explorations in practical, pastoral and empirical theology.

In 2011, Bob Shrine wrote about the topic of Deaf Liberation Theology in The church and the deaf community: a liberation perspective from a linguistic-cultural minority

In March 2025, a symposium between Gallaudet University, an American university for the Deaf, and the College of the Holy Cross was held to discuss the Claggett Statement and how it influences Deaf theology in the present day.

==== The Claggett Statement ====
The Claggett Statement is a central document outlining the foundation of Deaf theology. This document depicts Deaf people worldwide as being oppressed. The statement also points out how Deaf people have been enduring oppression historically too. Spiritually, this document claims, Deaf people have seen themselves as being "less than" hearing worshipers. It also discusses how religion is often used against Deaf persons, often Deaf people are told to hide their Deaf identity to fit into mainstream worship spaces. Additionally, the document calls for the creation of a form of worship that recognizes American Sign Language as an acceptable language for teaching about the gospel.

=== Perception of God ===
Reverend Anthony Russo, a Catholic leader in the Archdiocese of Philadelphia, performed a study in the early 1970s on Deaf people in an attempt to understand how Deaf people perceive God. Russo found that the Deaf people he studied have an anthropomorphic idea of God. Secondly, he brings up the concern of traditional forms of theism being difficult for Deaf people, who are dependent on ASL for understanding theological content.

== Jewish deaf theology ==
Deaf Jewish people hold intersectional identities, often having to grapple with the question of how to display both their Jewish identity and their Deaf identity simultaneously. An early proponent of Jewish Deaf theology was Rabbi Samuel Cohen, who was the first Deaf rabbi ordained by the Jewish Theological Seminary of America.

There exist Deaf synagogues and Deaf Jewish community centers, such as, the Hebrew Seminary of the Deaf in the United States. The Hebrew Seminary of the Deaf provides an estimate of 50,000 deaf Jewish people living in the United States.

The conservative movement within Judaism through the Committee on Jewish Law and Standards unanimously passed a ruling in 2011 that stated that Deaf people were no longer regarded as mentally incapacitated. Additionally, signed language was recognized as equal allowing greater freedom of language for deaf people within the conservative movement.

== Notable deaf theologians ==
- Andrew Foster - Founded Christian Mission for the Deaf
- Henry Winter Syle - First ordained Deaf Episcopal Priest in the United States
- Arthur Durham Bryant - First Deaf minister in the Calvary Baptist Church
- Richard Aslatt Pearce - First Deaf Anglican Priest
- Cyril Axelrod - Deafblind Catholic Priest
- William Clark - Anglican Priest
- Dobri Dobrev - Bulgarian Orthodox ascetic
- Rebecca Dubowe - Rabbi
- Donald Fairbairn - Religious Scholar
- John Kitto - Cornish Biblical scholar
- Francis Maginn - Church of Ireland missionary, co-founder of the British Deaf Association
- Tom Osmond and George Virl Osmond Jr. - First Deaf missionaries from the LDS movement, also members of the Osmond family
- Lloyd Howard Perkins - First Deaf Bishop in the LDS movement
- Samuel Cohen - Prominent Deaf rabbi in the early 20th century

== Notable hearing theologians ==
This list includes hearing theologians who made a significant impact on the Deaf community.

- Pedro Ponce de León - First teacher of the deaf, Spanish Benedictine Monk
- Juan Pablo Bonet - Spanish priest, recorded sign language for the first time
- Thomas Hopkins Gallaudet - Founder of the American School for the Deaf
- Thomas Gallaudet - Established St. Ann's Church for Deaf Mutes

== See also ==
- Black theology
- Christian communism
- Christian socialism
- Deaf education
- Deaf studies
- Feminist theology
- Liberation theology
- Pedagogy of the Oppressed
