= Languages of Tunisia =

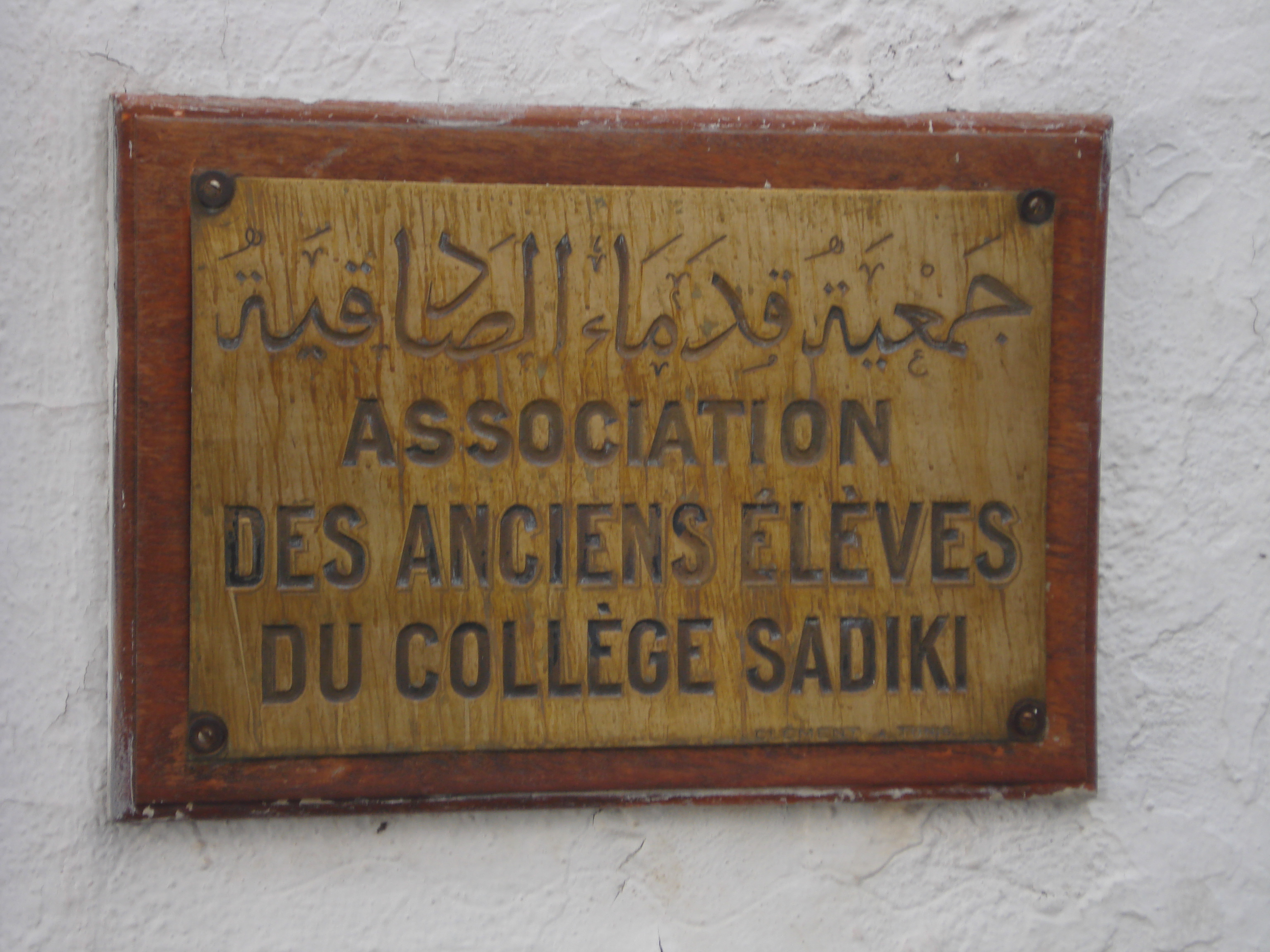
- Plaque in French and Arabic, Tunis
- Official: Modern Standard Arabic
- Recognised: French
- Vernacular: Tunisian Arabic
- Minority: Judeo-Tunisian Arabic, Jerba Berber, Matmata Berber, Domari
- Foreign: German, Italian, English, French
- Signed: Tunisian Sign Language
- Keyboard layout: AZERTY, Arabic keyboard

Of the languages of Tunisia, Arabic is the sole official language according to the Tunisian Constitution.

The vast majority of the population today speaks Tunisian Arabic as their native language, which is mutually intelligible to a limited degree with other Maghrebi Arabic dialects. Most inhabitants are also literate in Modern Standard Arabic (literary Arabic), which is taught at the primary and secondary education levels. A significant portion of the population can speak French to varying degrees, as French was the common language of business and administration during French rule in the region.

Eastern Berber languages are still spoken by some Tunisian minority groups (few thousands), but nowadays they use Arabic as the first language.

== Tunisian Arabic ==
A person speaking Tunisian Arabic.

The Tunisian Arabic (تونسي) is considered a variety of Arabic – or more accurately a set of dialects.

Tunisian is built upon a significant Phoenician, African Romance and Neo-Punic substratum, while its vocabulary is mostly derived from Arabic and a morphological corruption of French, Italian and English. Multilingualism within Tunisia and in the Tunisian diaspora makes it common for Tunisians to code-switch, mixing Tunisian with French, Italian and English or other languages in daily speech.

Examples:

• El ħája héđi lézemha tdemonstráta. ("This topic should be demonstrated", with "demonstráta" being of Romance origin).

• Béş noblíju en nés béş ykúnou ħáđrín. ("To force people to be present", with "oblíja" being of French origin).

•Lézm tkún ġandek personality qweya. ("You need to have a strong personality").

Moreover, Tunisian is closely related to the Maltese language, that descended from Tunisian and Siculo-Arabic.

== Berber languages ==
Berber languages (called "shelha" by Arabs) are mainly spoken in the villages of the south, including Chenini, Douiret, Matmata and Tamezrett. They are also spoken in some hamlets on the island of Djerba, mainly Guellala, Sedouikech and Ouirsighen.

== French ==
During the French colonization of Tunisia, French was introduced in public institutions, most notably the education system, which became a strong vehicle for dissemination of the language. From independence, the country gradually became arabized even though the public administration and education remained bilingual. Meanwhile, knowledge of French and other European languages (such as English) is enhanced by Tunisia's proximity to Europe and by media and tourism.

The 1990s marked a turning point for the Arabization process. Science classes up to the end of middle school were Arabized in order to facilitate access to higher education and promote the Arabic language in society. Since October 1999, private establishments have been obliged to give Arabic characters twice the size of Latin characters. This rule is not always followed, however. At the same time, the public administration is required to communicate in Arabic only. In this context, the use of French seems to be in decline despite the increased number of graduates in the educational system, which leads to the fact that a good knowledge of French remains an important social marker. This is because French is widely used in the business community, intellectual domains and the spheres of natural science and medicine. Because of this, one can consider the language to have become gentrified. Thus, French in Tunisia is a prestige language.

According to 2022 estimates provided by the Tunisian government to the Organisation internationale de la Francophonie, the number of French speakers in the country is estimated at 6.32 million people, or 52% of the population, almost all as a second language.

== See also ==
- Demographics of Tunisia
- Deafness in Tunisia
- Arab world
- French language in the Maghreb
- Languages of Algeria
- Languages of Morocco
