= Deafness in the Democratic Republic of the Congo =

The Democratic Republic of the Congo has a population of about 1.4 million deaf people out of a total population of about 86.7 million. The World Health Organization (WHO) claims that countries in Sub-Saharan Africa are one of the more greatly affected regions by hard-of-hearing complications, compared to the rest of the world. Deaf people in the DRC are subject to neglect and discrimination by their families and the government, but they are also met with small, various ways of support and charity through international, European, Australian, and American religious, non-religious, and governmental organizations.

== Language emergence ==
One of the official languages of the DRC is French (more closely related to Belgium French), still maintaining the effects of colonialism from Belgium. The other most common national native languages are Lingala, Kikongo, Kituba, Tshiluba, and Swahili, along with 215 smaller languages. All of these languages are spoken depending on how rural or urban the area is.

Sign language is now the fifth official language of the country. Francophone African Sign Language (LSAF) is used since a large portion of the population speaks French in governmental and educational spaces, and it became meshed into the local languages. American Sign Language (ASL) and Congolese Sign Language (CSL) have been reported to be in use as well, mainly in deaf schools. American Sign Language migrated to the DRC via mission work from America to West Africa, primarily from the contributions of Andrew Foster, a deaf African-American missionary. Foster founded 32 deaf schools in Africa, some of which in the DRC, and those particular schools teach ASL. For CSL and LSAF, it is unclear how much of it is taught in schools. In general, the Gallaudet University website lists 39 established schools in the DRC, and 56 were listed in a survey by the World Federation of the Deaf (WFD).

== Significant organizations ==
There are about 529 Congolese NGOs advocating for people with disabilities. Most of the organizations that intend to assist deaf people are European and Australian charities in partnership with other organizations in the DRC. These charities tend to be religious based and motivated by hearing people. However, Gallaudet University recognizes schools and possible smaller organizations that exist in the DRC. Also, the DRC is an official ordinary member of the WFD, a status in which any one organization in the DRC can be approved if it has a majority of deaf participants, is an achieved, legal organization in the country, and shares the goals of the WFD. There is also the Deaf People's Association in Kinshasa, the capital city of the DRC, in which the president, Ngoy Mwanza, responded to the 2011 ban on text messaging (see in the next section).

The National Association for the Deaf (Association Nationale des Sourds du Congo) (ANSCO) is an organization founded in 1988. It is unclear if the ANSCO is run by deaf or hearing people, or both. However, it mainly focuses on advocacy for interpreters, in which there are about 150 official interpreters in the DRC, reported in 2008. There is also a branch of this organization that is designed for parents, called the Union of Parents of Deaf Children of the Congo (Union des Parents des Enfants sourds du Congo) (UPEC). Additionally, the National Association for Interpreters (Association Nationale des interprètes en Langue des Signes) is a separate organization that receives funding from ANSCO.

There has also been mention of an organization for deaf women, called Action Femme Sourde (AFS) which advocates for deaf women to become involved in their communities. The American Bar Association partnered with AFS in March 2017 when a deaf woman in the DRC was raped and killed.

The Facebook page "Deaf News DRC / Info des Sourds de la RDC" currently has over 600 followers, and it contains past news events that have happened in the deaf community.

== Human rights ==
People with disabilities in the DRC are often subject to discrimination, neglect, and abandonment. In the United Nations Treaty Body Database has a number of ratified treaties with the DRC, including the Convention on the Rights of Persons with Disabilities (CRPD). The DRC's Ministry for Social Affairs, Humanitarian Action and National Solidarity agreed to the Convention and its Optional Protocol, which allows the convention to regularly examine the DRC on its tendencies and treatment if disabled people, on September 30, 2015. Adopted in December 2006, the convention is intended to advocate for the lives of disabled people, recognize accessibility and intersectionality within those communities, and in Article 2 of their Declaration, defending the right to communication and language via signing. The Committee on the Rights of Persons with Disabilities (CRPD) from the United Nations Joint Human Rights Office (UNJHRO) is also an involved organization in the DRC. Their involvement was established in 2008 with the main office located in Kinshasa and 11 other smaller offices placed throughout the country, and their "spotlight populations" include women and young people.

On December 3, 2011, the government of the DRC banned SMS text messaging as a response to protests from the recent presidential election results, in which Joseph Kabila won and his opponent, Étienne Tshisekedi rejected the result. The ban was created to control communication in hopes of limiting the organization of protests, especially violent ones. Before the ban, deaf people would receive text message alerts whenever violent protests occurred near them. Because of this deaf communities were more subject to danger. Many other people condemned the ban and were affected as well. Reporters Without Borders, an international NGO that protects the right to free speech in media, sent a letter of appeal to lift the ban to Adolphe Lumanu Mulenda Bwana N'Sefu, the Deputy Prime Minister and Minister of Interior and Security, claiming that the ban was unconstitutional. This would relate to Article 23 of the DRC's Constitution, which guarantees the right to freedom of expression. The ban was lifted after three weeks after much backlash by human rights organizations.

There is an independent film made by University of Siena Italian graduate, Antonio Spanò, called Inner Me. The film highlights the experiences of four deaf women, Immaculée, Jemima, Sylvie and Stuka, specifically in Butembo, North Kivu. These four women share information about their lives and experience within their community, and how being deaf isolates causes others to often isolate them.

== Early hearing detection and intervention ==
The Starkey Hearing Foundation is a non-profit healthcare group based in Minnesota, and has a hearing center in Kinshasa called the Speech and Hearing Cabinet. This organization seeks to provide technology and education with Starkey products through the philosophy of "community-based hearing healthcare."

A Christian charity organization based in Australia, called Medical Mission Aid, mentions on their website that they completed a project in Bukavu, DRC. The project took place at the ear, nose, and throat department of the General Hospital in Bukavu and intended to establish a more sufficient audiology department. According to their website, they asked for donations for audiological equipment, sought "rehabilitation services," and wanted to educate families and the general community on "ear health as a measure of prevention" and "implications for the disabled person." There is also a statement on their website explaining that they funded a student to study audiology and work both independently and as the audiologist of the hospital's EMT department, with the goal of providing hearing aid fittings, training for other audiologists, and more rehabilitation education.

The Center for Education and Community-Based Rehabilitation (CERBC) is an organization that was established in 2004 by Ismael Byaruhanga, a PhD graduate of the University of Cologne in Germany. On its website, it states that they are a Christian, non-governmental, and non-profit organization, and they focus on "rehabilitation," repairing the "dignity of people with disabilities," and "ensuring the integration of people with disabilities into society." In addition to audiology services, CERBC also provides primary and secondary education, speech therapy (not for deaf individuals, and more so for stuttering), physical therapy, and orthopedic surgery.

== Primary and secondary education ==
Before Andrew Foster's contributions, the Sisters of St. Joseph of Cumeo, from Italy, founded the first school for the deaf in 1955 in the Bandundu Province. Some primary and secondary schools in the DRC are deaf-specific, and some schools are for disabled people in general, and deaf people are intermixed within the program. There are 35 schools for the deaf listed on the Gallaudet University website, but it is uncertain whether or not each of the schools are still open.

The Institut pour les Sourds-Muets de Kinshasa (ISMK) was founded in 1979 by African American missionary Andrew Foster. It now operates preschool through 8th grade, with vocational emphasis in later years. Every Child Ministries, an American NGO, supports the school through child sponsorship, a chaplaincy and practical helps. The Center for Education and Community-Based Rehabilitation (CERBC) also has primary and secondary schooling, and between 2016 and 2017, 38 deaf students attended. Their website states that three of their deaf students and two of their students with physical disabilities were abandoned at the school. Dorms are also provided for students who cannot commute. In their secondary schooling, the students pick their possible vocational career and are trained in that respective diploma program. The diploma programs offered are tailoring, computer skills, and music, which the website says is the Northeast DRC's first music program.

Aru School for the Deaf or Ecole des sourds-Muets d'Aru (ESMA) is an approved, registered school by the Government of Republic, but it is not a school that is owned by the government. The school was established in 2004 in Aru, north-east DRC, and it operates by Christian-based organization. Their main goal is to help establish better lives for the attendees of their school, which are deaf, blind, and disabled people. Their tactics for this include training instructors and parents in sign language, ear screenings for deaf "prevention," training in various trade skills, basic education, and bible studies.

Bo-Ta-Tuba Primary School for the Deaf is located in the Bandundu region of the DRC. The school was funded by The United Nations Children's Fund (UNICEF) to receive hearing aids for their deaf students, of which 30 of them got hearing aids in the 2013–2014 school year, and 45 in the 2014–2015 school year. According to the head of the school, Sister Brigitte Tau, one of their achieved goals with this program was that the "perception of disability" improved, in turn creating a rise in equality in Bandundu.

The School for the Deaf in the city Buta in Bas Uélé, DRC is another recorded primary and secondary school. A group of children and two directors from the school received support from the Acting Governor of Bas Uélé, Ruth Baduli Gbangosa, after their in-person meeting where the children discussed unfair treatment, such as their teachers not getting paid, the absence of benches on school grounds, and their unsuccessful academic development because of these dilemmas and others.

Nguvu Yetru is located in the town of Rutshuru in Kiwanja, DRC, and is best known for its vocational training in masonry, carpentry, sewing, and photography. The training there even interested and accumulated students who are hearing and do not have disabilities. The head of the school, Audacieux Ntaumenya Jimmy, quoted to the media, "The apprentices from our school are highly appreciated by the population and employers who are increasingly calling on them." In the 2019–2020 school year, 30 students were in the primary school and nine in secondary.

Man Like You is a school created by a Catholic nun, Sister Wivine Lukalu or "Mom Wivine," located in Mbujimayi, DRC. It is a school for deaf people and other children with disabilities, and the deaf children speak to each other in sign language, though it is not certain which sign language that is. Built by the Episcopal Conference of Italy, but not receiving sustainable and operating funds, the school is now funded by the Congolese State, and half of the staff is paid by the State monthly. The children receive literacy education and vocational training, such as sewing, weaving, shoemaking, agriculture, and music, but they also lack some materials, in need of kitchen utensils, more food, and supplies for their blind students.

Hope Deaf-Blind School in Goma is a local, non-profit educational organization that is not currently running yet and still being built. A GoFundMe page called "Hope Deaf-Blind School" was created on October 13, 2022, explaining that the children were abandoned by their families and are lacking in nutritional food at the program, and because of these factors are prone to diseases. They mention that they will use the funds they receive for more nutritional food, training instructors and parents, and better managing household waste.

== Employment ==
Based on the schools for the deaf and children with other disabilities that exist in the DRC, there are some opportunities for being a teacher and/or interpreter. The students at these school receive mainly a basic education and vocational training for employment opportunities related to trade work. This could be in order to work for a company or, since employment discrimination is something deaf people often have to face, create their own small business. Congolese law does not allow for discrimination against race, gender, language, or social class. However, in Congolese law specifically, there is no clear law that prohibits discrimination against disability. About 93% of people with disabilities in the DRC are unemployed.

On the Gallaudet University website, there are 4 listed programs under "Interpreters' Organizations in DR Congo" and 3 under "Professionals' Organizations in DR Congo." The websites of these programs, if any, seem to be French-based, however the contact information on the Gallaudet website lists African names.

The Kadiwaku Family Foundation (KFF) is a non-profit organization, founded in 2018 by John Kadiwaku Ntonta, that promotes the rights of the disadvantaged and disabled people of all ages in Africa, most prominently in the DRC. Specifically, they assist in skills of entrepreneurship and provide finances for the people in these communities to create lives for themselves as independent workers. As of 2018, the organization activated 7 "training centers" around the country that are still running, offering them grants, networking support, and business opportunities. They organized the first conference in Kinshasa, called "Inclusive Entrepreneurship for People with Disabilities," on the International Day for People with Disabilities, and trained about 650 disabled people to be equipped with the tools to become entrepreneurs, also as of 2018.

== Healthcare ==
There are a number of hospitals in the DRC, especially in the major cities of Kinshasa and Goma. In the DRC, roughly 90% of doctor and hospital patients pay their medical bills out of pocket. For example, if someone was in the hospital for 30 days, they would owe about $515 in the DRC. There is a controversial practice that occurs in the medical field, affecting 24% of the world's countries and 15 out of the 54 countries in Africa. This process is hospital detainment, where either a deceased patient is not released because the family cannot pay for their treatment, or a living patient is denied release because they cannot pay their own bill. This means that detention disproportionately affects poorer people who cannot easily afford medical treatment. Also, in order to avoid increasing someone's medical bill and putting them and the hospital into more debt, patients do not receive additional treatment while detained. This can potentially lead to patients' symptoms worsening, as well as possibly affecting other nearby detainees. In the DRC, hospital detention is more common among post-natal women, who are unable to pay for their bills because they are unmarried, have been abandoned by a provider, or experienced nonconsensual impregnation.

Deaf people tend to already be cautious about receiving medical treatment, because of the lack of communication to be had, as well as the fact that they are also disproportionately unemployed. The detention of patients is a fear of a general public, convincing many people not to seek medical treatment. This is especially true for deaf people, also because they tend to live in more rural areas, which leads to a less sufficient and personalized education, in turn, leading to less effective communication between medical staff, which may result in incorrect diagnosis. In a 2021 study, deaf people from the Sub-Saharan Africa regions reported unfair treatment by medical staff, including not being treated like a priority, lack of privacy and autonomy, and general disrespect.

== See also ==
- Deafness in Benin
- Deafness in Egypt
- Deafness in Tunisia
- History of deaf education in Africa
