= Deafness in Benin =

In Benin, deafness affects 12,500 people out of their total population of 10 million. Since the late 1900s, there has been a growing emergence of resources, recognition, and support for the deaf people in Benin. The deaf community uses American Sign Language (ASL), Langue des Signes de l'Afrique Francophone (LSAF), and Langue des signes du Bénin (Benin Sign Language). The type of sign and how many people use each remain undocumented. However, in 1994, one of the first LSAF dictionaries was published in Benin.

== Cultural views, deaf rights, and the CRPD ==
In Benin, there is a common misconception that deafness is a curse or misfortune brought onto families of deaf children. Other Beninese people believe that the deafness is hereditary and many deaf people are banned from marrying other deaf people. An interview done by Anaïs Prévot on Paul Agboyidou, President of the Deaf School of Louho, and Raymond Sekpon, director of the CAEIS of Louho and President of the NGO ASUNOES-Benin, revealed that Beninese views on deafness still remain mostly negative. Deafness is seen as a curse that is brought onto the family because they angered a deity. Deaf people are also seen as inferior and less capable then a hearing person. According to Paul Agboyidou, people used to chew a leaf at a deaf person to insinuate that they are like sheep who all they do is graze. This isn't seen as much anymore since the creation of the school in Louho and increased community awareness on deafness.

As of 1988, Benin has been a member of the World Federation of the Deaf (WFD). According to the International Disability Alliance (IDA), Benin ratified the Convention on the Rights of Persons with Disabilities (CRPD) and its Optional Protocol (OP) on July 5, 2012. Additionally, there is no mention of sign language in their legislation and there is no Code of Ethics for sign language interpreters. Deaf people in Benin are not considered to be equal citizens.

== Causes of deafness ==
The main cause of deafness is due to disease (i.e. meningitis and malaria) and poor healthcare. During pregnancy, illness or improper medication use can cause birth defects that can lead to hearing impairments. A newborn may also be given improper dosages of medication and vaccines that can cause side affects leading to deafness.

== Early screening and interventions ==
=== Newborn and infant hearing screening ===
As of June 28, 2022, neonatal deafness screening was initiated at the Mother and Child University Hospital Center Jeanne Ebori Foundation (CHUMEJE) through the help of the National Health Insurance and Social Guarantee Fund (CNAMGS). Under the leadership of Professor Simon Ategbo, this is part of the Health Department's launch of their assisted medical procreation (PMA). The screening is done while the child is sleeping by placing some ash in their ear and collecting sound emissions (the term "ash" is most likely a translation error within the article, most of the time a transmitter device is placed in the ear, please see Otoacoustic emission).

=== Interventions ===
Currently, there is no available information on early interventions (i.e. cochlear implants, hearing aids, etc.). The only mention of interventions was through sponsorship programs like Amities Solidarite France Afrique. ASFA helped provide a deaf student with hearing aids through a donation from "Ecouter Voir" in Ollioules.

== Emergence of sign languages ==
American Sign Language (ASL), Langue des Signes de l'Afrique Francophone (LSAF), and Langue des signes du Bénin (Benin Sign Language) are the primary signing languages that are documented to be used in Benin. However, there is no additional information on how many people use each language.

=== American Sign Language ===
Andrew Foster was an African American missionary/pastor that is well regarded as the person who brought American Sign Language (ASL) to Africa. He helped open schools for the deaf in several African countries as well as a training center for teaching of the deaf, known as Ibadan. The first deaf teachers in Benin came from the training center in Ibadan where they taught ASL to their students.

=== Langue des Signes de l'Afrique Francophone (LSAF) ===
Over time, with ASL being taught and used alongside French, a new form of sign language took on the signs of ASL, but the grammar of French. This led to the evolution of Langue des Signes de l'Afrique Francophone (LSAF) which is distinct and unrelated to French Sign Language. LSAF has been considered a dialect of ASL, however recent discussion has led to LSAF to be considered its own language independent from ASL.

== Significant organizations ==
In Africa, being deaf is still considered a major handicap and leads to constant discrimination therefore deaf education is of high importance and is the main focus for deaf-led organizations in Benin.

=== Association Nationale des Sourds de Benin ===
This organization was noted by Carsten Mildner as being a deaf-led organization in Benin, however, no other documentation exists about the history or presence of this organization other than from the African Sign Languages Resource Center website or "Making Lives, Making Communities: Deaf Youth in Benin" by Carsten Mildner.

=== The Universal Association of Works for the Development of the Deaf (ASUNOES) ===
The Universal Association of Works for the Development of the Deaf (ASUNOES) works to support the deaf community and defend their rights. The Center for Reception, Education, and Integration of the Deaf (CAEIS) was founded by the ASUNOES as a place of education for the entire community. The CAEIS applies an integrated method in order to ensure that both the deaf and hearing receive the same lessons. The CAEIS offers a lot of different kinds of additional support to the deaf community. The skills training workshops are used to deter literate deaf children from becoming homeless and provide them a way to receive training, certification, and even start their own business. The CAEIS has a sports team that allows deaf children to participate. Although this organization says it has college programs and deaf admittance, there is no further information on the college itself or the fields of study being taught.

=== Solidarité-Sourds-Bénin (SSB) ===
This is a French organization located in Fidjrossè-Kpota in Cotonou that started in June 2012 under the law of July 1, 1901 (the law is not further specified). This organization was founded by deaf professionals that were former students of Benin's first deaf public school (the name is not specifically mentioned). They created the Association for the Promotion of Employment for the Deaf (APES) due to the lack of work that was offered to deaf people in Benin. In 2005, they created the Center for the Promotion of Deaf Initiatives in Benin (CPISB) with support from France, Canada, and the Agence de la Francophonie. Part of this center was made into a school because of public interest in having a deaf school. This center also offers vocational training in hairdressing, sewing, or painting.

=== Amitiés Solidarité France Afrique (ASFA) ===
This organization was created in 2004 through the 1901 law (not specified) to help provide support to African students. ASFA sponsors Beninese children in dire financial need to support their school studies and health through vaccines and other health coverage. This organization helped provide support for a student at the Cotonou School for the deaf by providing him with a hearing aid. ASFA is making plans to provide more support for this school as well.

== Deaf education ==
In 1957, Andrew Foster opened schools for the deaf in Africa in Accra, Ghana and Lagos, Nigeria. Andrew Foster was also responsible for opening a training center in Ibadan for teaching the deaf in 1975. By 1976, the training center was able to send out its first deaf teachers to Togo, Benin, the Ivory Coast, and Senegal. Today, there are several nursery primary schools as well as deaf colleges in Benin.

=== Primary and secondary education ===
There are a number of primary and secondary schools that offer education for the deaf, although many of the schools below claim to be the only one.

==== École Béninoise pour Sourds (EBS) ====
Created in 1977 by Andrew Foster, École Béninoise pour Sourds (EBS) was the first school for the deaf in Benin until the 90's. The school was originally part of the Center for Household Education in Gbéto-south in Cotonou. The first set of students was taught by a career teacher and a deaf person that were trained at the training center in Ibadan. Eventually, other deaf schools were created in Sènandé in Cotonou, Parakou, Bohicon and Porto-Novo.

==== Center for Reception, Education, and Integration of the Deaf (CAEIS) ====
The CAEIS was founded by ASUNOES in the Louho school district in 1997. Located in Porto Novo, the CAEIS was created with the focus on an integrated model off education. In classrooms, spoken French and sign language are used in tandem and the student body is made of both deaf and hearing students. There is no information on what type of sign language is taught and used here. The EIS is their primary school and the CSEB is their secondary school.

==== Centre pour la Promotion des Initiatives des Sourds du Benin (CPISB) ====
CPISB was created in 2005 by the French organization Solidarité-Sourds-Bénin (SSB). This school offers primary and secondary education. The teachers are all trained deaf professionals that offer a bilingual education in French-LSAO (West African Sign Language). This school also aims to help provide food to their students and provide students who live further away with accommodations to ensure they still receive an education.

=== Higher education ===
Higher education for DHH individuals in Benin is highly restricted due to the lack of DHH institutions and low admittance of DHH students into mainstream colleges and universities. As mentioned in "Making Lives, Making communities," many of the students that are admitted to colleges in Benin are post-lingually deaf. Many of the students don't need to rely on interpreting services and also come from a decent education backgrounds. For students that are pre-lingually deaf or post-lingually deaf at a very early age, the education that they receive during their primary and secondary studies usually isn't as rigorous as education that is taught in mainstream schools, therefore preventing them from being at the level of admittance.

== Healthcare ==
=== Communication ===
Access to healthcare services in Sub-Saharan Africa is limited by the lack of communication between DHH individuals and their families. According to Baratedi et al., the most pressing issue for accessing healthcare is the communication barrier. DHH individuals are reliant on their families, however, many families are either overprotective, inattentive, or all around neglectful. All of which increase the difficulty for accessing health care. Communication between healthcare workers and deaf patients as well as a lack of health knowledge prevents better access to DHH people. Oftentimes interpretation services are unavailable are expensive. In addition, healthcare workers often lack knowledge on deafness. Deaf people frequently face discrimination within clinical settings. Deaf people are forced to wait long periods of time because hearing people are served first. Deaf people have reported that healthcare workers rude to them or outright negligent which further discourages DHH individuals from accessing health services.

==== HIV/AIDS ====
There is a great lack of knowledge and awareness of HIV/AIDS and its spread within deaf populations globally. Many DHH people are severely undereducated leading to a lack of health-related information, especially sexual and reproductive issues. Very few countries in Africa are aware that it can affect deaf people. People with disabilities are often neglected when it comes to HIV prevention, education, and access to testing and treatment. Treatment, medication, and transportation costs are all struggles for many in the deaf community since many people are unemployed or have low paying jobs. This burden is especially worse for individuals with HIV/AIDS.

== See also ==
- Deafness in the Democratic Republic of the Congo
- Deafness in Egypt
- Deafness in Tunisia
- History of deaf education in Africa
