= Cinquantenaire (disambiguation) =

Cinquantenaire may refer to:

- Golden jubilee (50th anniversary) the meaning of cinquantenaire
- 1880 half-century anniversary of the 1830 Belgian Revolution
- Cinquantenaire Park, Brussels, Belgium
- Cinquantenaire Arcade, Brussels, Belgium
- Cinquantenaire Museum, Brussels, Belgium
- Cinquantenaire Hospital of Kinshasa, DRC (Zaire)
