= Health in Tunisia =

Life expectancy at birth in Tunisia

In 2016, life expectancy in Tunisia was 74 years for males and 78 years for females. By comparison, in the 1960s it was only 47.1 years. Infant mortality in 2017 was 12.1 per 1,000 live births.

Measles, tetanus, and polio have been largely eliminated by a major immunization program. Schistosomiasis and malaria are rare, though rabies, stings, and leishmaniasis are still an issue. Non-communicable diseases associated with an unhealthy lifestyle are now the leading causes of death.

The Human Rights Measurement Initiative finds that Tunisia is fulfilling 85.7% of what it should be fulfilling for the right to health based on its level of income. When looking at the right to health with respect to children, Tunisia achieves 96.4% of what is expected based on its current income. In regards to the right to health amongst the adult population, the country achieves 96.5% of what is expected based on the nation's level of income. Tunisia falls into the "very bad" category when evaluating the right to reproductive health because the nation is fulfilling only 64.3% of what the nation is expected to achieve based on the resources (income) it has available.

Tunisia is facing an exodus of its qualified doctors to Europe, particularly France.

== Healthcare ==
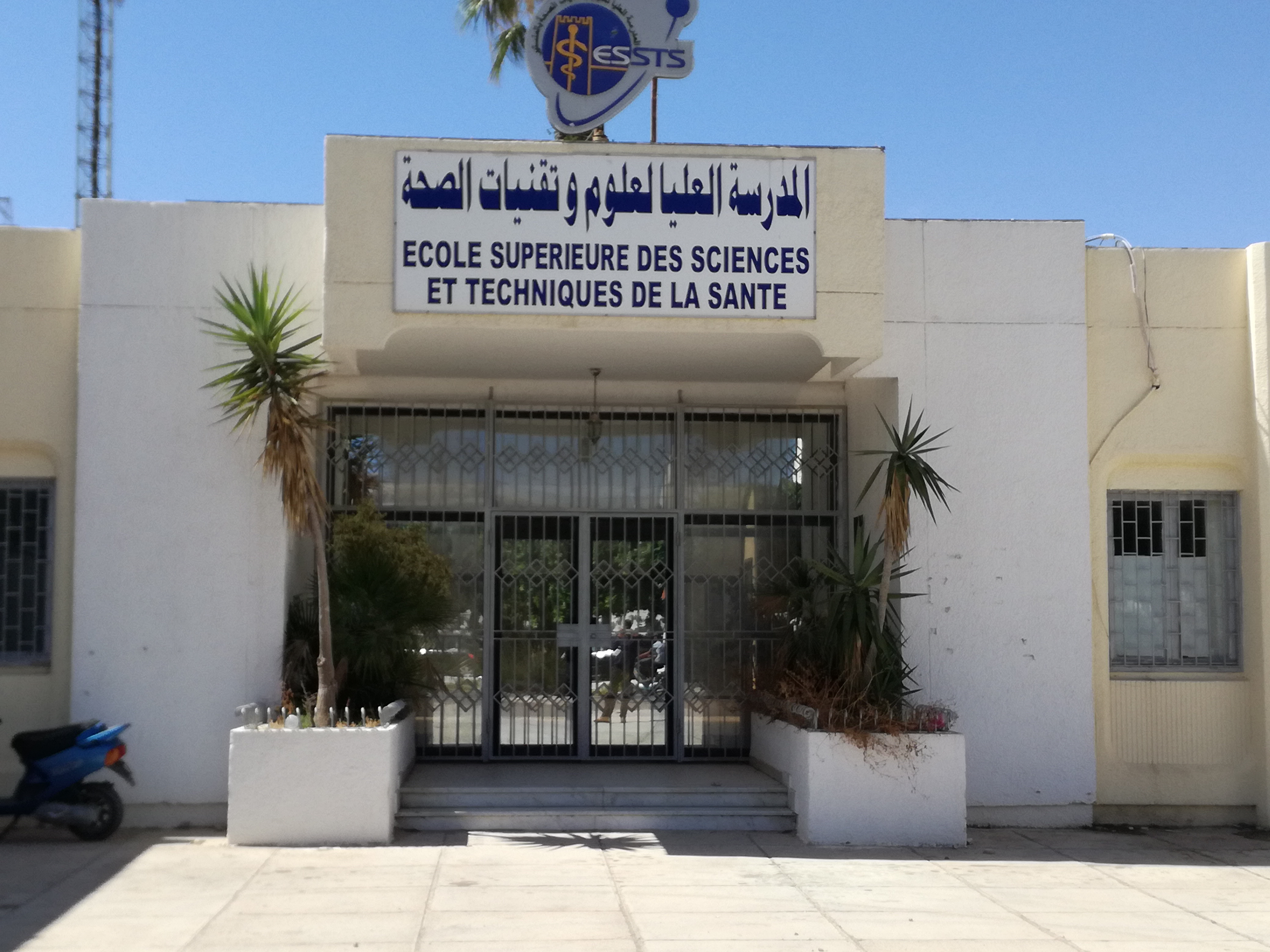
Health school in Monastir

Tunisia has a public health system funded from taxation run by the Caisse Nationale d'Assurance Maladie that provides care for the majority of the population. It includes health centres providing primary care, district and regional hospitals, and university hospitals. Contributions were set in 2010 at 6.75%: 2.75% paid by the employee from salary and 4% by the employer. Some treatment in the private sector is covered by the scheme.

Co-payments were introduced in 1994 at 10% and increased to 20% in 1998. Out-of-pocket payments are now more than half of the total health care expenditure.

There is a private health care sector, concentrated in the cities, with both for-profit and non-profit organizations running hospitals and facilities. This has 12% of the total bed capacity and 70% of the top range medical equipment. More than half the doctors, 73% of the dentists, and 80% of the pharmacists work in the private sector. The medical tourism industry is the second largest employer and second highest foreign currency earner.

== See also ==
- Deafness in Tunisia
