= Uvira General Referral Hospital =

- Ministry of Public Health
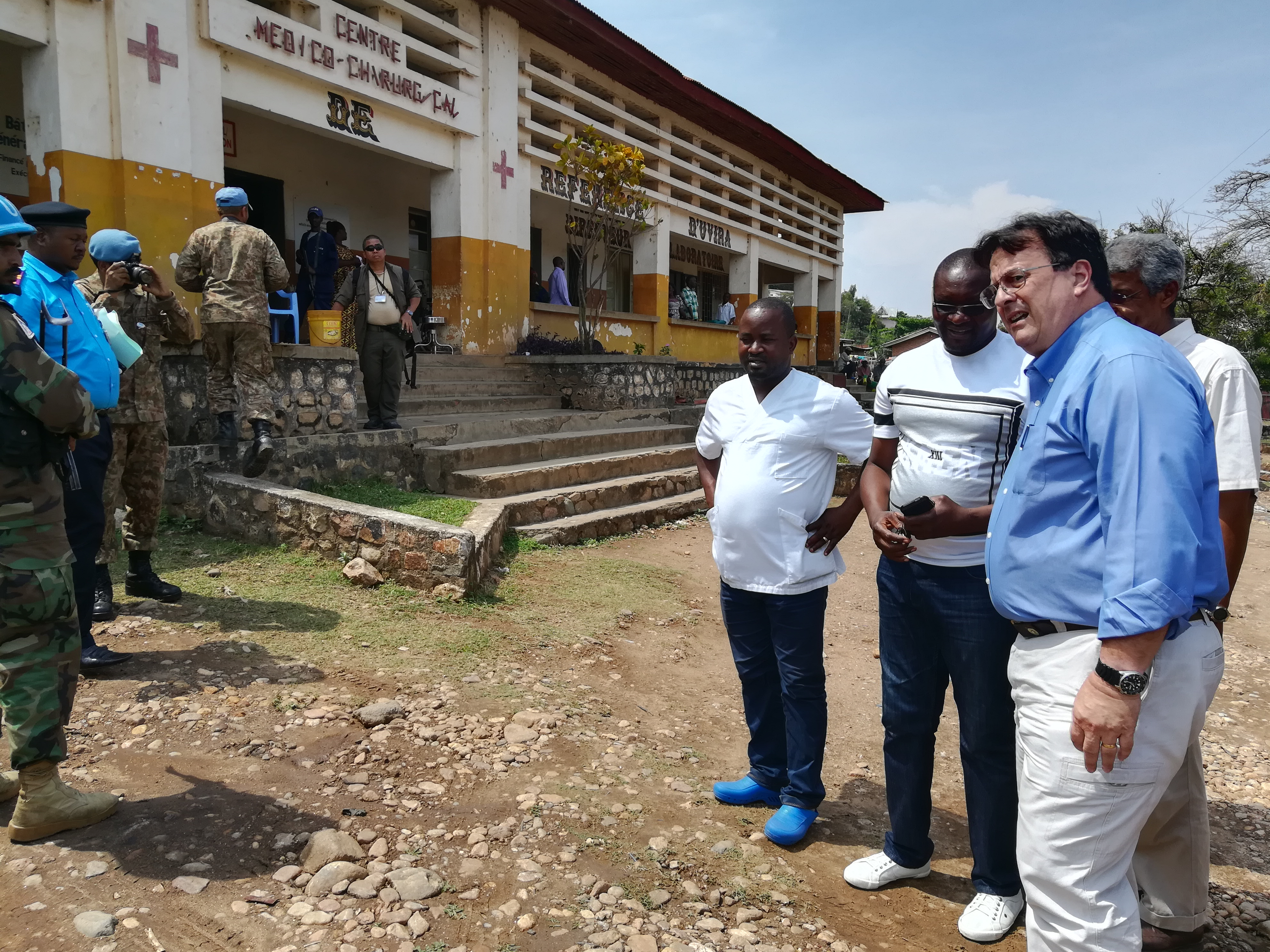
- David Gressly welcomed by the Director of the Uvira General Reference Hospital

Geography
- Location: Uvira, South Kivu, Democratic Republic of the Congo
- Coordinates: 3.3912°S 29.139°E

Organisation
- Funding: Public
- Type: General

Services
- Emergency department: Yes

History
- Opened: 1952; 74 years ago

Links
- Lists: Hospitals in Democratic Republic of the Congo

Uvira General Referral Hospital (French: Hôpital Général de Référence d'Uvira) is a medical center located in Uvira, in the eastern region of the Democratic Republic of the Congo. As a general hospital, it provides a broad spectrum of medical services, including primary, secondary, and tertiary care. The hospital's services include emergency care, surgical procedures, maternal and pediatric services, and treatment for various medical conditions.

In partnership with the German government, facilitated through its Ministry of Foreign Affairs and Medeor Action, the Women's Association for the Promotion and Endogenous Development (AFPDE) launched the construction of mortuaries at the hospital in March 2013.

== Location ==
The hospital is strategically positioned within the urban-rural health zone of Uvira in the South Kivu. It is situated along the main road that connects the provincial capital, Bukavu, to the administrative center of Fizi Territory.

Geographically, the hospital is flanked to the east by the expansive Lake Tanganyika, to the west by the Mitumba Mountains, to the north by the commercial area of Mulongwe, and to the south by the locales of Kimanga and Songo. The hospital is located approximately 128 kilometres (80 mi) from Bukavu and 28 kilometres (17 mi) from Bujumbura.

== History ==
The hospital was constructed in 1952 through the initiative of the Indigenous Welfare Fund (Fonds du Bien-être Indigène; FBI). The construction project was overseen by Mr. Khulpe, a Belgian construction director. Initially, the hospital was conceived as a surgical medical center, with Dr. Louis Rousseau, the inaugural physician, at its helm. Dr. Rousseau was ably assisted by two religious sisters, nurses, and twenty-three lay nursing aides. The institution was instrumental in delivering healthcare services across the Uvira Territory and its vicinities.

In 1980, the hospital was officially recognized as a general referral hospital within the rural health zone of Uvira. Since that time, it has played a vital role in offering comprehensive medical care to the area. Currently, the hospital is led by Dr. Bahati Bagale Yves, a Congolese surgeon. In April 2007, UNICEF donated a significant batch of medicines to the hospital. However, by September of the same year, the facility encountered severe financial difficulties, lacking a laboratory, adequate medical equipment, and specialist doctors. Reports at the time indicated that the hospital did not even have an ambulance. The following year, the hospital staff faced salary arrears spanning four months, affecting approximately 120 personnel. In March 2009, the hospital underwent renovations, with buildings repainted, a hospital ward constructed, and fencing added to secure the premises. In May of the same year, an Italian medical team performed twelve harelip surgeries at the facility. The hospital was also at the center of emergency response efforts following major disasters. In July 2010, after the Sange fuel tank explosion—which resulted in at least 269 deaths—a significant number of victims were admitted for treatment.

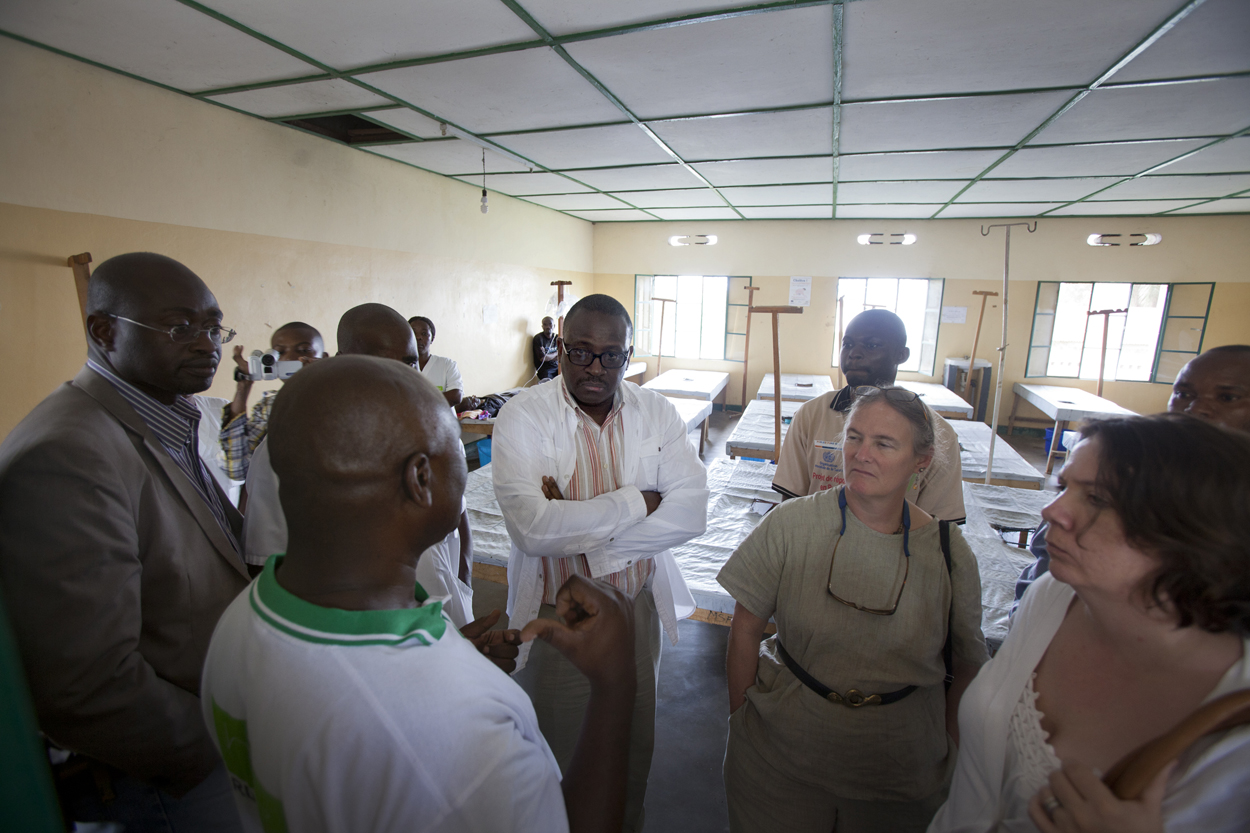
MONUSCO DSRSG Fidèle Sarassoro visits a cholera medical unit, one of two Pooled Fund projects implemented by OXFAM GB and Hope in Action.

The hospital continued to face severe infrastructural and logistical challenges. In March 2013, ten newborns died due to power shortages. On 27 November 2013, a grenade explosion in the Mulongwe market resulted in one fatality and twenty serious injuries, seventeen of whom were treated at the hospital. In December 2016, following clashes between the Armed Forces of the Democratic Republic of the Congo (FARDC) and suspected Burundian soldiers from the 3305th FARDC regiment, five fatalities were recorded, with their bodies placed in the hospital morgue. Despite these hardships, the hospital has received periodic support. In March 2017, the provincial Minister of Public Health of South Kivu donated a large batch of medical equipment and supplies. Similarly, in 2020, the United Nations Population Fund (UNFPA) provided medical supplies and dignity kits for women of childbearing age.

== Organization ==
The hospital is structured into several administrative divisions, which include the Secretariat, Finance, General Workers, and Other Support Staff.

Secretariat: Tasked with clerical and administrative responsibilities, the Secretariat division is composed of:

- Secretary
- Typist Clerk
- Office Assistant

Finance: The finance department oversees the hospital's financial transactions, accounting, and reception activities. Personnel in this sector include:

- Accountant
- Cashier
- Receptionists
- Auditor

General Workers: This group includes attendants and personnel responsible for assisting patients as well as maintaining facility security and upkeep. Key roles within this division include:

- Male Attendants
- Female Attendants
- Guards
- Gardeners

Other Support Staff: Additional personnel are dedicated to providing specialized maintenance and tailoring services that support hospital operations. Team members are:

- Maintenance Workers
- Tailor

== Services ==
=== Medical services ===
The medical services include:

- Internal medicine
- Surgery
- General and clinical pediatrics
- Obstetrics and gynaecology

=== Para-medical services ===
Para-medical services include:

- Laboratory
- Medical imaging: ultrasound X-ray
- Pharmacy: deposit and truth
- Physiotherapy

=== Specialized services ===
Specialized services include:

- External consultation: generalist, specialist
- CNT, CTC, dentistry

== See also ==
- Lemera Hospital
- List of hospitals in the Democratic Republic of the Congo
