= Deafness in Egypt =

According to The Deaf Unit Cairo, approximately 1.2 million deaf and hard-of-hearing individuals in Egypt are five years and older. Deafness can be detected in certain cases at birth or throughout childhood, regarding communication delays and language deprivation. The primary language used amongst the deaf population in Egypt is Egyptian Sign Language (ESL). It is widely used throughout the community in many environments such as schools, deaf organizations, etc. This article examines various aspects of Egyptian life and their impact on the deaf community.

== Language emergence ==
The primary sign language used throughout Egypt is Egyptian Sign Language (ESL), which emerged around 1984 when the National Association of the Deaf created an online dictionary. According to Ryan Fan in Verb Agreement, Negation, and Aspectual Marking in Egyptian Sign Language, the only data documented concerning Egyptian Sign Language is within the DVD dictionary published by the Deaf Unit and in a textbook published by the Asdaa' Association for the Hearing Impaired in Alexandria. There is currently little information about variation in ESL, and "no grammatical descriptions available."

== Significant organizations ==
=== The National Association for the Deaf ===
The NAD is housed in Old Cairo and has educational programs for Deaf adults.

The association runs various educational programs for sign language and the Deaf community in Alexandria.

=== The Deaf Fraternal Society ===
The Deaf Fraternal Society is an entirely Deaf-run organization in Alexandria.

=== The Egyptian Institute for Deaf Rights ===
The EIDR is an institution in Giza that works for the legal rights of Deaf Egyptians.

=== Resala ===
Resala is an Islamic charitable organization in Egypt with centers throughout the country. Some of its centers offer educational services to Deaf individuals.

=== The Deaf Unit Cairo ===
The Deaf Unit Cairo is a deaf organization/school based in Cairo, Egypt, that offers programs for deaf, hard-of-hearing, and hearing individuals. In 1982, the Deaf Unit of Cairo originally started as a school for deaf children under the Episcopal Diocese of Egypt with North Africa and the Horn of Africa before it expanded to include teacher training programs, the Deaf Club, the Deaf Church, two community-based rehabilitation programs, and the start-up of the Audiology Clinic. They target the deaf and hard-of-hearing population that cannot afford services and provide them with the opportunities they need socially and financially. One of their main goals is to help bridge the interaction between deaf and hearing individuals, so they integrate within hearing organizations to help foster this relationship. For example, the Deaf Club, deaf adults attend events twice a week that help integrate them into the community and learn about Egyptian culture.

=== The Deaf Ministries International ===
The Deaf Ministries International is a faith-based organization that works to give deaf individuals the right to education, employment, and to be able to practice their faith in their language, ESL. The Deaf Ministries began in 1979 when Neuville and his wife moved to South Korea and created a small church for the deaf. The message grew, and so did the services as they now reach across 19 countries and provide churches, schools, small factories, farm projects, dormitories, and Christian centers for the deaf. The organization focuses on three main areas: church planting, education, and aid & development, where deaf individuals can explore their community and culture through their faith.

== Early hearing detection and intervention ==
No Universal Newborn Hearing Screen (UNHS) program exists in Egypt. A few initiatives and studies have been conducted and put in place to begin screening newborns. In September 2019, the Ministry of Health and Population conducted a hearing survey "as a part of a presidential initiative for early detection and treatment of hearing loss and impairment for newborns nationwide." Approximately 3,500 health centers have taken part in this initiative, screening newborns from the day of birth up to 25 days after birth.

The initiative includes a step-by-step process to determine newborns struggling with hearing loss. After the initial screening, 174,465 newborns were re-examined during a second screening at the same unit. After the second screening, 18,945 newborns were referred to approximately 30 different hospitals and medical centers nationwide to seek further evaluation due to concerns found during their screenings. These referrals range anywhere from receiving hearing technologies such as cochlear implants or hearing aids to further medical treatment to diagnose due to a lack of resources. Due to the lack of a UNHS system, many hospitals and medical centers have begun implementing their methods, procedures, and tests to help detect hearing loss in newborns. Some of these tests and methods include Transient Evoked Otoacoustic Emissions (TEOAE) and Auditory Brainstem Response (ABR). The TEOAE tests the cochlea's outer hair cells with a series of stimuli, such as clicks, whereas the ABR measures reactions to the nervous system with a series of stimuli.

Although Egypt has not yet implemented a UNHS system, it has created a Targeted Neonatal Hearing Screening (TNHS) screening method. TNHSs are considered a risk-based screening method where only neonates with possible risk factors for hearing loss are screened and tested after birth. The TNHS system is considered a "compromise" between the range of no UNHS system and a fully functioning UNHS system.

Regarding early intervention measures, the research leans towards a more parental education effort, whereas for the child, it doesn't begin until they enter school. The Deaf Unit in Cairo holds ESL classes for parents, family members, and friends to immerse them in learning ESL. They also offer workshops to teach parents how to respect their deaf child and break down the cultural misconceptions about the deaf not being as capable as a hearing individual. As part of a campaign initiated in 2019, hearing technologies such as cochlear implants would be offered to children who needed them. There are still barriers to overcome that lead infants to not receive hearing aids if they want to, due to financial costs not associated specifically with the cochlear implant device, such as the cost of the surgery, post-surgical treatment, and follow-up treatments and therapies.

== Language deprivation ==
Language deprivation is the universal term when a child lacks access to a "naturally occurring language during their critical language-learning years." When a child experiences language deprivation during their "critical period," they risk experiencing cognitive and linguistic delays. In Egypt, studies have shown that Language Deprivation is an issue amongst DHH children. In 2015, a group of researchers set out to determine the risk factors associated with the number of delayed language development cases in children who were referred to the Phoniatric and Neuropediatric Unit at Sohag University (PNUSU). The study was split into two sections: one evaluating the socio-demographic culture of the child and their family, and the other, language assessments using standardized language scales and measures. The participants included 800 Arabic-speaking Egyptian children with delayed language development, whose ages ranged from 18 months to 5 years, and the results amongst the hearing-impaired were concerning. According to the study, "among the 172 cases of hearing impairment, 67 cases (39.0%) were presented between 3-5 years, 46 cases (26.2%) after 5 years, 39 cases (22.7%) between 2-3 years, and 21 cases (12.2%) before two years". Out of all the studied cases, the percentage of children with hearing impairment and language delay was among the top three.

== Primary and secondary education ==
The Deaf Unit in Cairo, a small deaf school in Cairo, Egypt, currently has 60 students. The Deaf Unit provides deaf students, who mostly come from hearing families, the opportunity to not only be immersed in deaf education, but also to foster "better communication between deaf and hearing people." The Deaf Unit is a boarding school-like format where the children are given 3 meals a day and a place to live and sleep to create a deaf community. The school consists of "2 deaf teachers, 12 hearing teachers, 2 deaf house mothers, 2 hearing deaf mothers, five full-time administration staff, and five women who support through kitchen and cleaning work." The students are taught a primary and middle school level education, and after completing the curriculum, they will take their government-issued exams at a government school to receive a government certificate. The children do then leave The Deaf Unit during the day to receive a secondary education at a local government school, but return to The Deaf Unit after school to help with the younger children, to take extra classes, or get help with their studies. The goal of The Deaf Unit is to prepare deaf students to be able to interact and live outside of the deaf community and provide them with the confidence skills to be able to live a successful, independent life.

== Employment ==
A few government documents define the employment status and opportunities for Deaf individuals in Egypt. Article 81 of Egypt's 2014 Constitution states that people with disabilities shall be given equal opportunities in all avenues of life, such as through jobs, economically, socially, health, environmental adaptations, political rights, justice, etc. Article 10 of the Rehabilitation Act No. 39, which was then amended by Law No. 49 in 1981, states that "five percent of the total number of employees in each unit of the state administration body, public bodies, and the public sector shall be allocated for disabled recipients of rehabilitation certificates." The original quota stated in this act was 2% before it was amended in 1981 and increased to 5% of the employees in a workplace must be disabled. In 2006, the Egyptian census estimated that approximately 1.8% of the Egyptian population is disabled, with the deaf being amongst them.

Fulbright Egypt recently started accepting deaf individuals into its Community College Initiative (CCI) Program. The CCI sends approximately 1,000 men and women from Egypt to the United States to community college for vocational training, specifically geared toward learning skills to help improve their likelihood of employment. The deaf individuals accepted into the program are required to take an English Language course and learn ASL before traveling to the United States. The program includes comprehensive courses covering all areas the applicants wanted to study, including photoshop, HVAC, laser marking, embroidery, computer maintenance, etc. When the deaf individuals returned to Egypt, they received additional training on communicating with others (deaf and hearing), which was implemented to improve teamwork and interview skills. The deaf individuals who participated in this program expressed that they could take what they learned through their training and apply it to their new professions.

== Healthcare ==
Article 81 of Egypt's Constitution states that people with disabilities shall be given equal opportunities in all avenues of life, such as through jobs, economically, socially, health, environmental adaptations, political rights, justice, etc. According to the article Disability in North Africa, "the health and rehabilitation services for children and adults with disabilities are lacking, of poor quality, and do not meet all their needs." Although Egypt has ratified the UNCRPD, laws prohibiting discrimination in various areas of life do not exist or have not been implemented".

For deaf individuals, assistive devices, such as cochlear implants and hearing aids, are rehabilitation services with some issues. The coordination between the technical standards and the healthcare professional is weak, leading to "insufficient use" of these devices. In terms of health insurance, it is deemed to be highly segmented, where many vulnerable populations are left out and "it can be assumed that large groups of persons with disabilities are not included in the health insurance system." A September 2022 study found that "inequalities hinder access to and utilization of hearing-related resources among Pediatric Cochlear Implantation (PCI)." There is currently little research and specific data evidence about the disability disparities in the healthcare system.

== See also ==
- Deafness in Benin
- Deafness in the Democratic Republic of the Congo
- Deafness in Tunisia
- History of deaf education in Africa
