= Deafness in Ghana =

Deafness in Ghana carries with it a large social stigma. Deafness in Ghana is also a variegated subject, in large part due to government policies, or a lack thereof. Deaf Ghanaians choose from a number of sign languages, with the primary one estimated to be Ghanaian Sign Language. The exact number of deaf individuals in Ghana is not known for sure, but It is estimated that there are between 110,000 and 211,000 deaf and hard of hearing people in Ghana. Deaf awareness in Ghana has been on the rise since the arrival of the educator Andrew Foster from America in 1957. There are over a dozen schools teaching deaf Ghanaians, and a number of organizations advocating on behalf of Ghana's deaf population.

== Stigmas ==
Deaf Ghanaians face serious social stigma. Many members of the community think deafness is a curse, often handed down as punishment for a sin made in a previous life. This stigma often leads to deaf children being neglected by their parents. Experts believe that a lack of understanding of deafness at a societal level leads to the rejection of deaf children, preventing them from achieving important developmental landmarks such as acquiring a language. Along a similar line, sign language is viewed as a second rate form of communication, and not taught in many schools. Perhaps as a result of stigmatization, DHH individuals in Ghana report feeling lonely and isolated. It's often the case that a DHH individual's own family doesn't know how to sign. Many DHH individuals feel that they can only communicate effectively with other DHH individuals.

== Sign languages ==
There are four different sign languages practiced in Ghana. Many experts believe that one of the primary issues Ghana faces is lack of government support for an official sign language in Ghana. In 2006, the Ghanaian government passed the Persons With Disability Act to provide equal rights for disabled people. This act was later ratified in 2012 to provide more protections; however, many experts in the subject are calling for yet another ratification to bring Ghana's disability policy in line with the requirements laid out by the United Nations' Convention on the Rights of Persons with Disabilities.

== Medical aspects ==
The causes of hearing impairment in Ghana are not well studied. What is known is that hearing impairment is usually either acquired or inherited. Generally, females tended to be more at risk for acquiring hearing impairment than males, and adults more than children. In regard to inheriting hearing impairment, studies have linked one gene in particular to hearing loss; however, no other genes were studied. Overall, more research is needed to pinpoint causes with more accuracy.

A source close to the situation indicates the primary solution to deafness in Ghana is the teaching of sign language in schools for the deaf. In fact, none of Ghana's 14 deaf schools provide hearing devices of any type for their students. The sole reliance on signing has led to some difficulty in deaf Ghanaians receiving adequate health care due to communication barriers between care givers and patients.

== Deaf associations ==
The primary deaf association in Ghana is the Ghana National Association of the Deaf. GNAD was founded in 1968 and is recognized as a volunteer organization by the Ghanaian Ministry of Manpower. GNAD is a member of the World Federation of the Deaf and a member of the Ghanaian organization Ghana Federation of Disability Organizations. GNAD aims to change social stigmas regarding deaf individuals through education and organized sporting activities. GNAD also seeks to aid deaf individuals who are struggling economically by teaching them skills that can be applied to a trade.

Additionally GNAD has an active youth wing (GNAD-YS) focused on providing education to deaf children so that they can participate in the economy and lead safe, secure lives. GNAD-YS was founded in 2009 with the primary goals of removing communication barriers and being pushing towards equal opportunity for deaf individuals. GNAD also has a women's branch abbreviated GNAD-WW. The focus of the women's branch is to support and empower deaf women. In Ghana, there is a stigma surrounding deaf women, that they are incapable or that they are weak. It is the goal of GNAD-WW to fight this stigma. Mistreatment by men is a problem for deaf women in Ghana. It is not uncommon for men to make deaf decisions for deaf women without regard for the woman's needs. The women's branch is trying to combat this by empowering women to take action as well as reeducating men.
