= History of deaf education in Africa =

Prior to 1956, the only deaf schools in Africa were in Egypt and South Africa. Andrew Foster brought American Sign Language (ASL), and deaf schools to Africa in 1956. After Andrew Foster's death in 1986, deaf schools have continued to vary and spread across Africa.

== Ghana ==
Deaf education was first introduced by Andrew Foster in 1957, there was no deaf education or organizations prior to that.

Andrew Foster introduced Ghanaian Sign Language, a variety of American Sign Language. Ghanaian Sign Language is the national sign language of deaf people in Ghana. However Ghanaian Sign Language threatens indigenous sign languages, such as Adamorobe Sign Language and Nanabin Sign Language.

There are researchers working to document Adamorobe Sign Language, most indigenous, or village sign languages are not documented.

There are nine schools for the deaf in Ghana.

== Kenya ==
- Deaf education in Kenya

== Nigeria ==
Deaf education was first introduced by Andrew Foster in 1957, there was no deaf education or organizations prior to that. He introduced Ghanaian Sign Language, a dialect of ASL. In 1960 Nigerian Sign Language was introduced, also as dialect of ASL and it is the national sign language of Nigeria.

Local sign languages existed prior to these introduced languages, such as Bura Sign Language which is used by the Bura people in a very remote area.

Chadian teachers for the deaf are trained in Nigeria. There are deaf schools in N’Djamena, Sarh, and Moundou.

== South Africa ==
Deaf education in South Africa began in the late 19th century with missionary-run schools, such as the establishment of St. Vincent's School for the Deaf in Johannesburg in 1934, which primarily used oralist methods. However, the introduction of South African Sign Language (SASL) in education was only formally recognized after the end of apartheid in 1994, marking a shift towards inclusive and bilingual approaches.

== Tunisia ==
The January 2012 Tunisian Revolution had positive results for the deaf population of Tunisia. Deaf people were allowed to vote for the first time in 50 years. There are also studies in Italian Sign Language.

== See also ==
- Christian Mission for the Deaf
- Deafness in Benin
- Deafness in Egypt
- History of deaf education
- List of sign languages
- List of schools for the deaf
