= Diego de Astor =

Spanish engraver

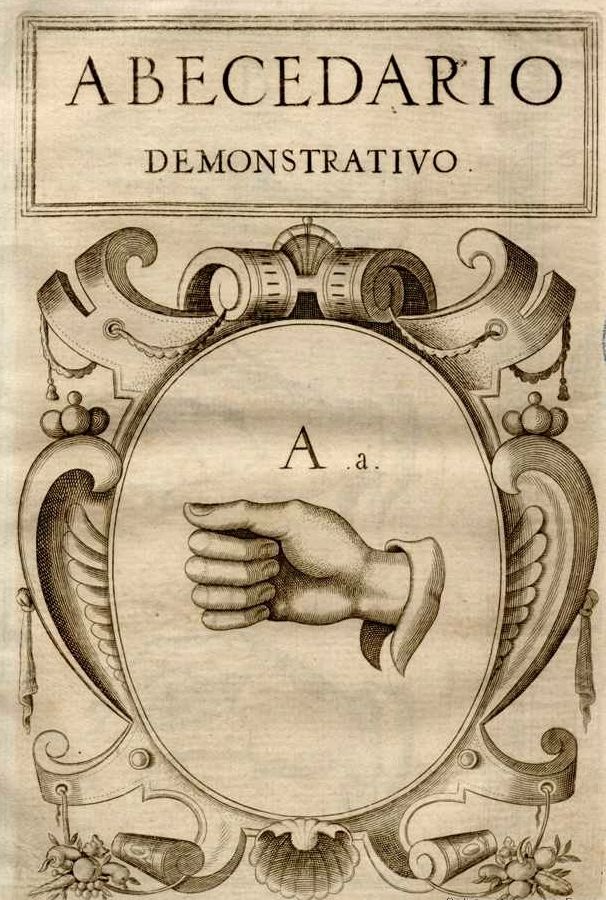
Letter "A" from the sign language book by Juan Pablo Bonet, 1620.

Diego de Astor was a 17th-century Spanish engraver from Toledo. He studied under Domenico Theotocopuli, and in 1606 engraved, under his superintendence, a 'St. Francis,' after Nic. de Vargas. Astor was engraver to the Mint of Segovia, and was also employed to engrave the royal seals. Of his plates we may notice the titlepage to Colmenares' Historia de Segovia (Madrid, 1640), and a series of plates of the first documented manual alphabet for the purpose of deaf education in Bonet's book Reducción de las letras y arte para enseñar a hablar a los mudos ("Summary of the letters and the art of teaching speech to the mute") .
