= L'hôpital du Cinquantenaire de Kinshasa =

l’Hôpital du Cinquantenaire de Kinshasa
- Congolese Ministry of Health
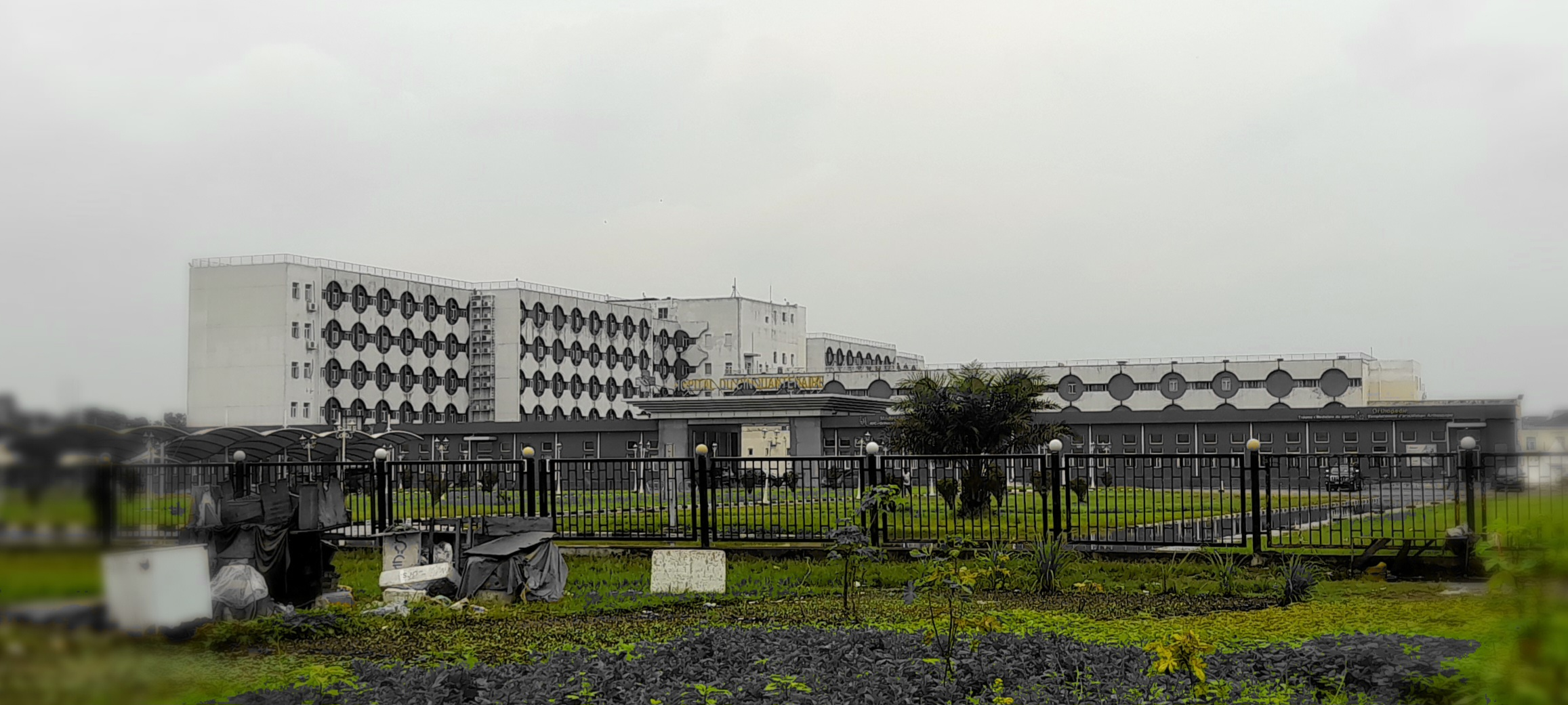

Geography
- Location: Mont Ngafula, Kinshasa, Democratic Republic of the Congo
- Coordinates: 4.341625°S 15.296555°E

Organisation
- Type: General

Services
- Beds: 515

Links
- Lists: Hospitals in Democratic Republic of the Congo

l’Hôpital du Cinquantenaire de Kinshasa is the second largest hospital in the Democratic Republic of the Congo after the Kinshasa General Hospital. The hospital is in the Mont Ngafula area south of Kinshasa, Democratic Republic of the Congo. The hospital includes 515 beds, surgical services, infectious diseases, pediatrics, gynecology, obstetrics, ENT, nephrology, urology, cardiology, respiratory medicine and other health services. The hospital was opened on 22 March 2014.
