= Tamezret =

- Commune and town
- Tamezret ⵜⴰⵎⵣⵔⴻⵜ
- Interactive map of Tamezret
- Coordinates: 33°32′18″N 9°51′55″E
- Country: Tunisia
- Governorate: Gabès Governorate
- Time zone: UTC+1

Tamezret or Tamazrat (Berber languages: ⵜⴰⵎⵣⵔⴻⵜ) is a Tunisian Berber village located in the south-east of the country, about ten kilometers from Matmata and forty kilometers southwest of the capital of the governorate of Gabès on which it depends. Ridge village built on the four slopes of one of the highest hills of the Matmata mountains.(480 m altitude).

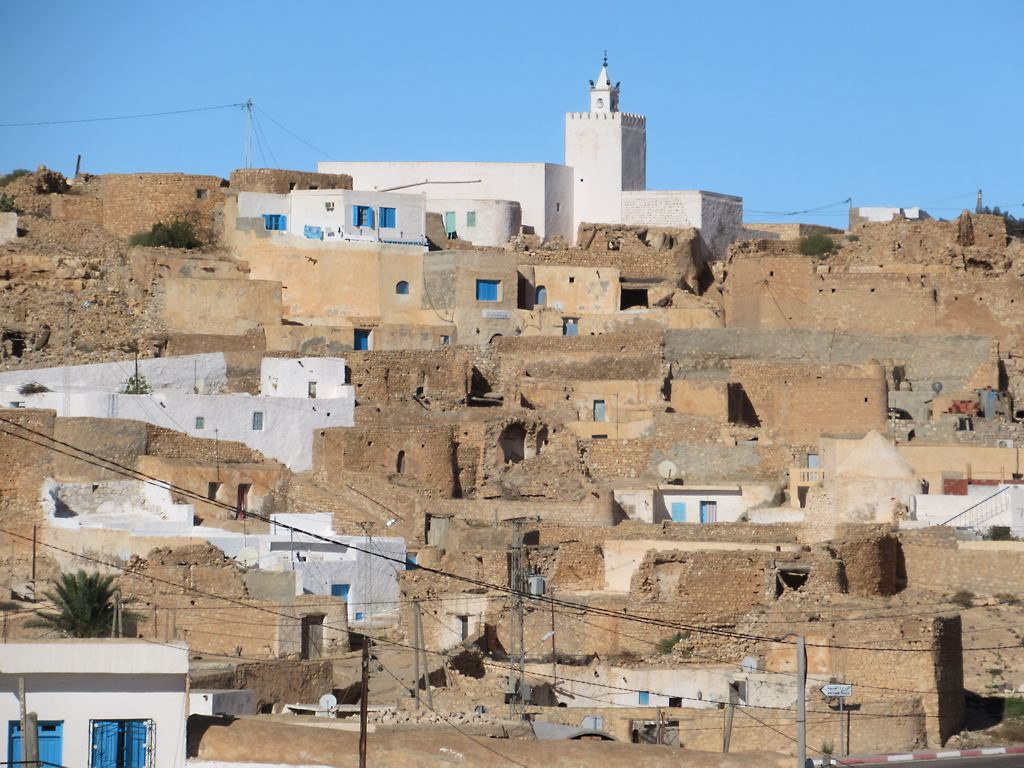
Tamezret

== See also ==
- List of cities in Tunisia
