= Juan Pablo Bonet =

Spanish priest (1573–1633)

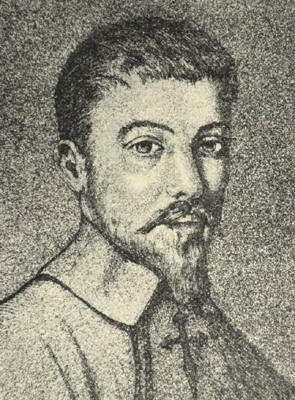
Juan Pablo Bonet

Juan Pablo Bonet (c. 1573–1633) was a Spanish priest and pioneer of education for the deaf. He published the first book on deaf education in 1620 in Madrid.

== Life ==
Juan Pablo Bonet was born in Torres de Berrellén (Aragon), and became secretary to Juan Fernández de Velasco, 5th Duke of Frías, Condestable of Castile. While serving in the Condestable's household, Bonet observed the methods of a tutor hired to teach Luis, the Condestable's second son, who was deaf from birth. In this wealthy and titled family as well as in others related by marriage or birth were a number of deaf sons and daughters whose parents wanted them educated in addition to their hearing siblings. Some of the deaf sons were in line to inherit the family's properties, and literacy was a requirement for legal recognition as an heir.

The modern recorded history of sign language began in the 17th century in Spain, in part with Bonet. In 1620, Juan Pablo Bonet published Reducción de las letras y arte para enseñar a hablar a los mudos ("Summary of the letters and the art of teaching speech to the mute") in Madrid. The book is considered the first modern treatise of phonetics. Also, it depicts the first documented manual alphabet for the purpose of deaf education, though this was most likely borrowed from Pedro Ponce de León. His intent was to further the oral and manual education of deaf people in Spain.

Bonet's manual alphabet has influenced many sign languages, such as Spanish Sign Language, French Sign Language, and American Sign Language.

Engravings by Diego de Astor of Reducción de las letras y arte para enseñar a hablar a los mudos (Bonet, 1620):

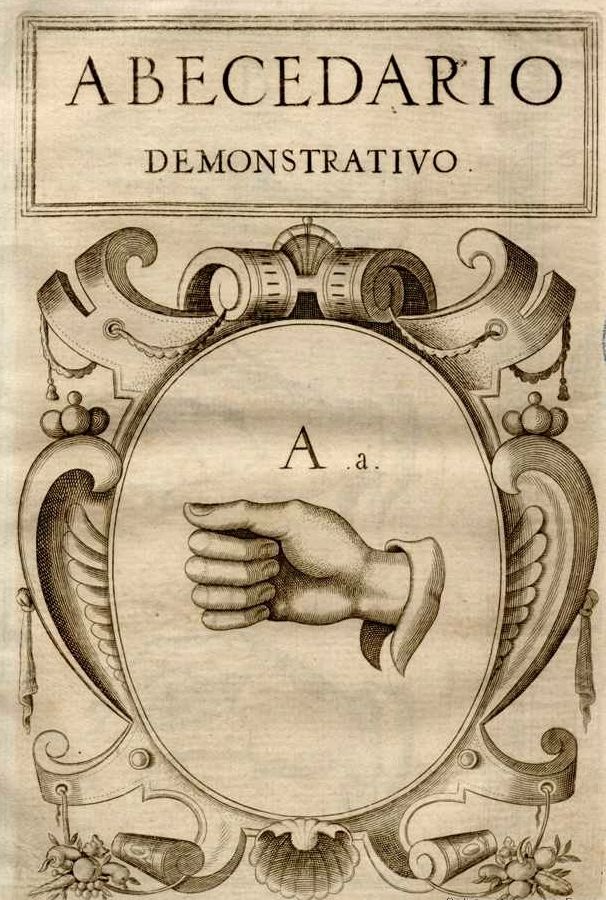
A.

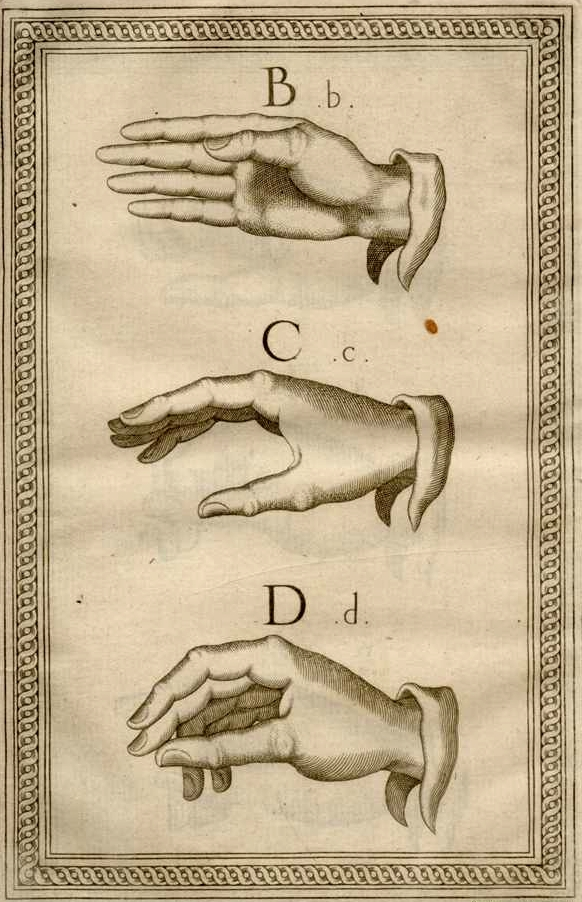
B, C, D.

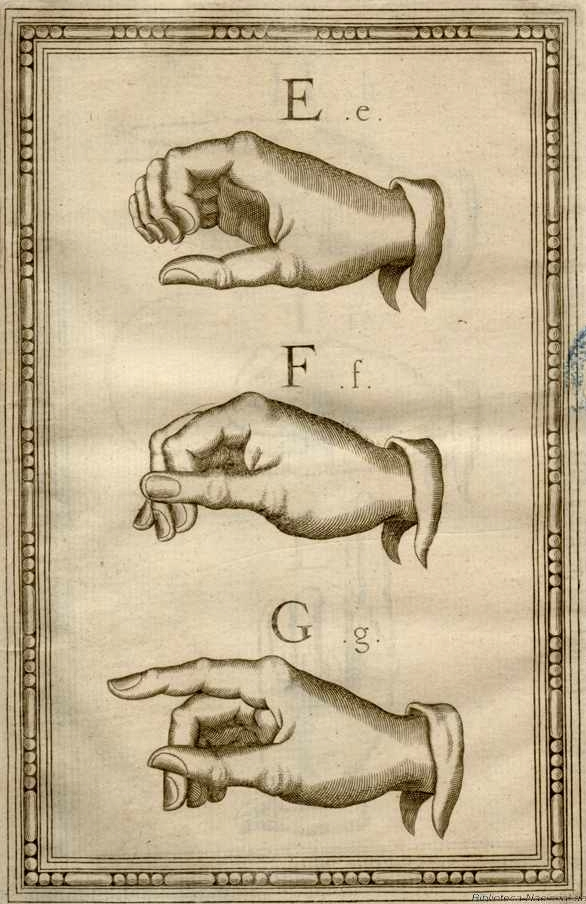
E, F, G.

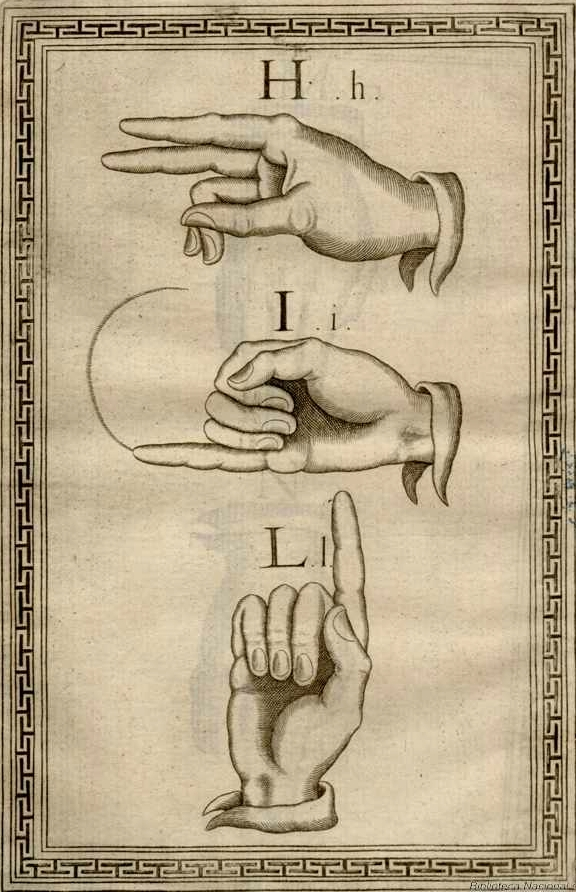
H, I, L.

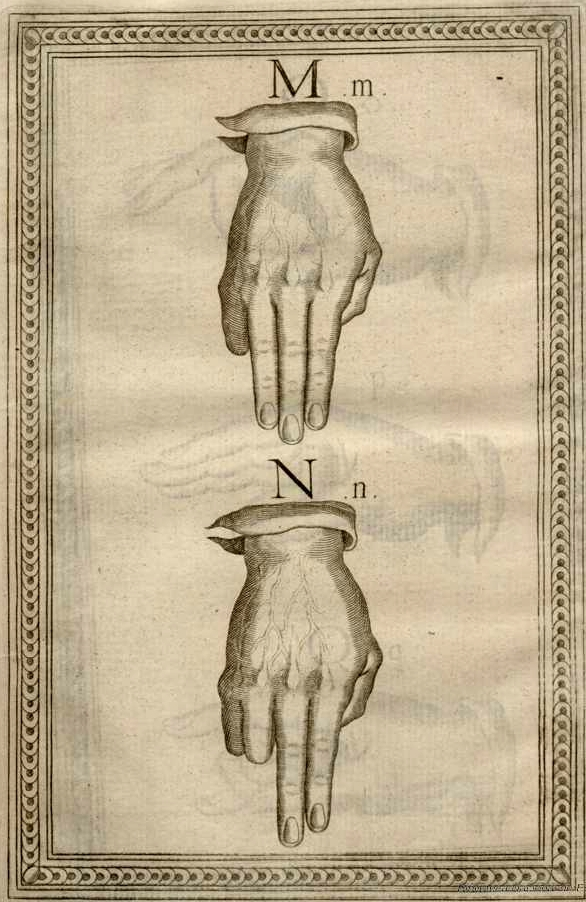
M, N.

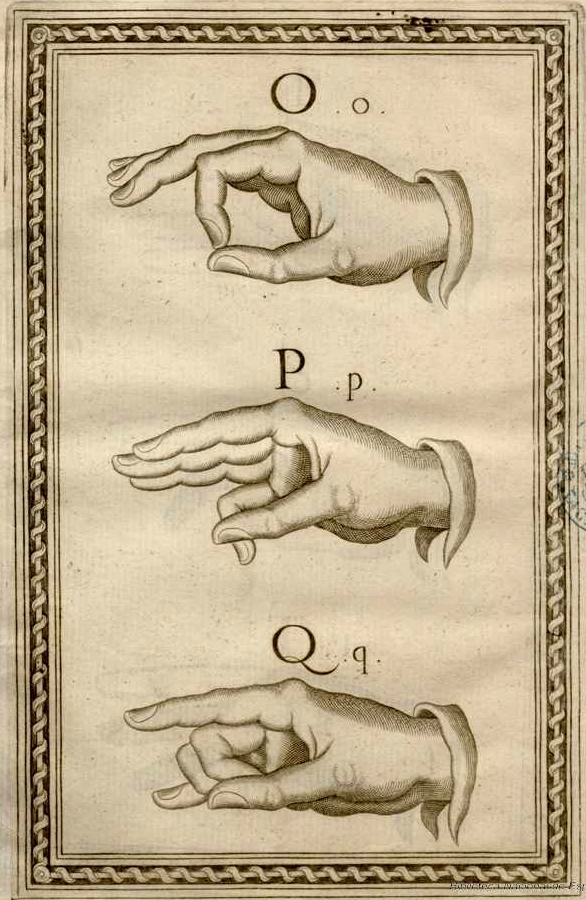
O, P, Q.

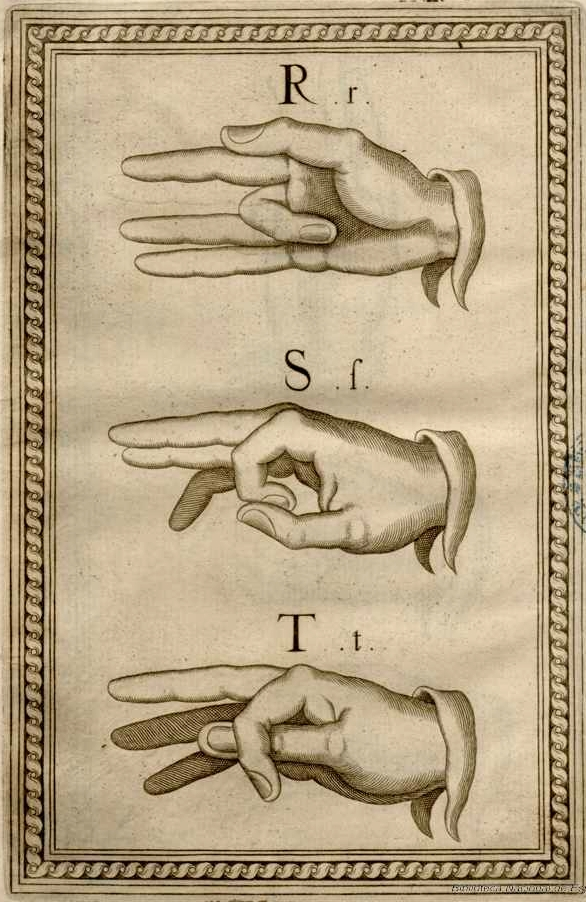
R, S, T.

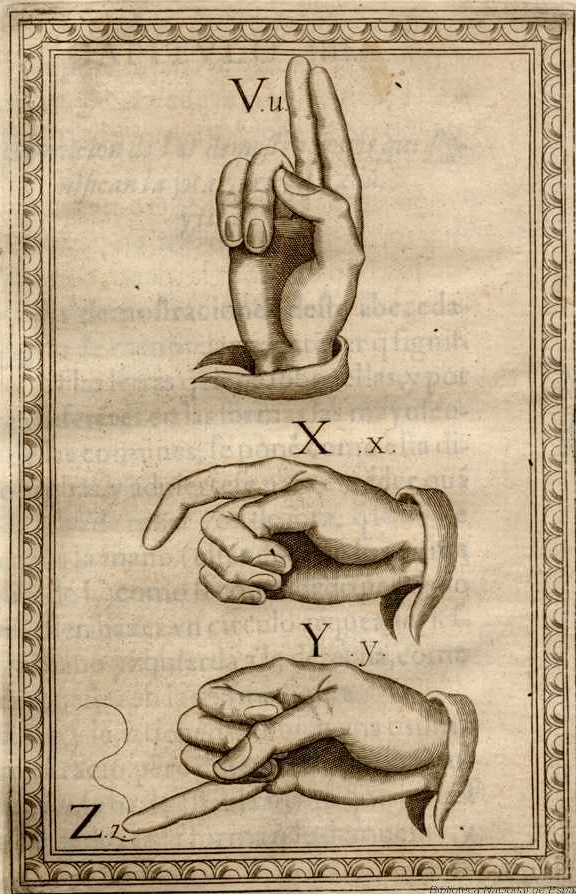
V, X, Y, Z.
