= Pedro Ponce de León =

Spanish Benedictine monk (1520-1584)

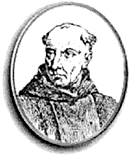
Pedro Ponce de León

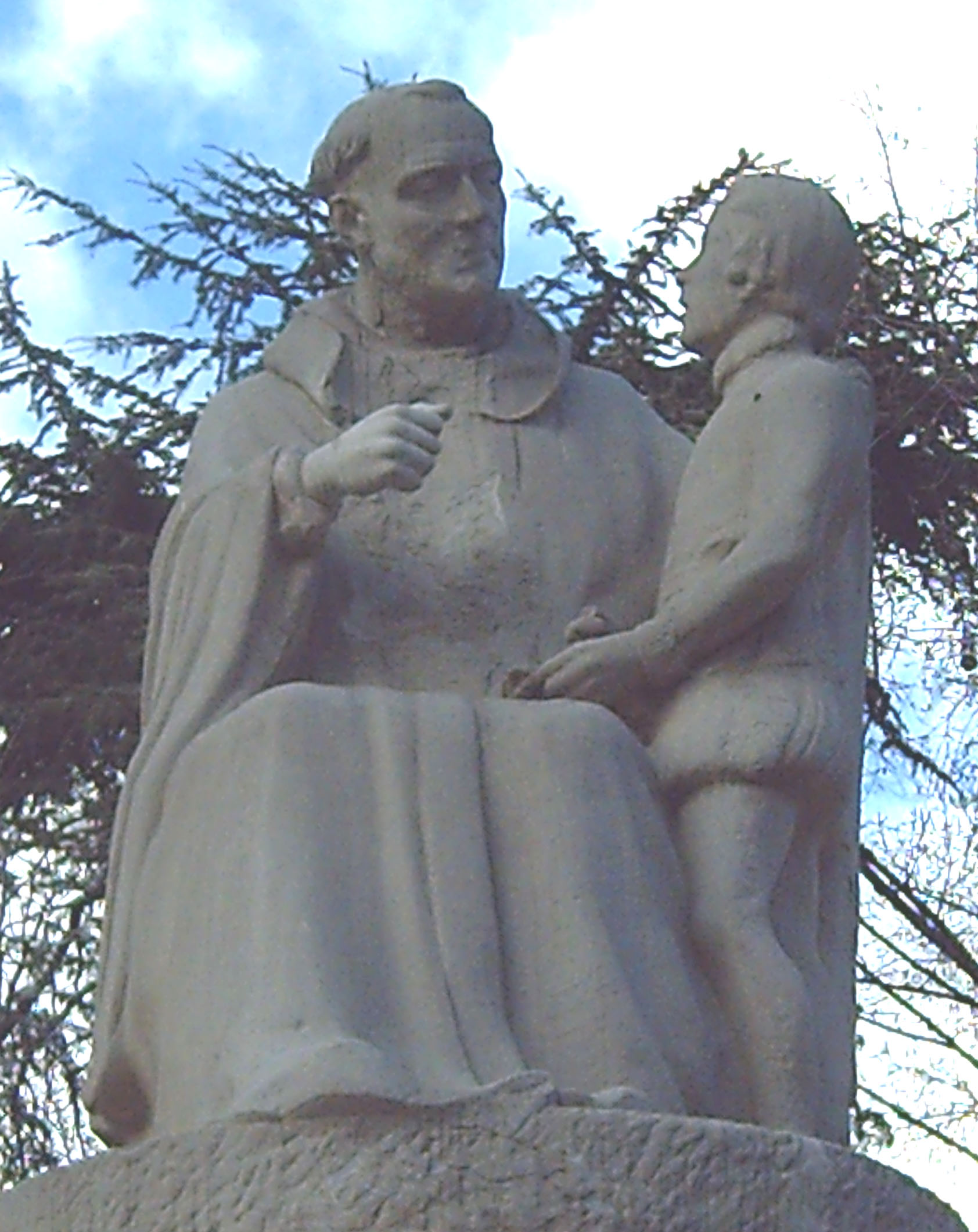
Dom Pedro Ponce de León teaching a pupil (Detail of a monument in Madrid, Spain.)

Dom Pedro Ponce de Leon, O.S.B. (1520, Sahagún – 29 August 1584, Oña) was a Spanish Benedictine monk who is often credited as being "the first teacher for the deaf".

== Biography ==
Ponce de Leon established a school for the deaf at the San Salvador Monastery in Oña. His students were almost all children of wealthy aristocrats who could afford private tutoring. His work with deaf children focused on helping them to learn how to speak a language audibly. He also instructed children in writing and in simple gestures. His teaching was informed by his being a monk he claimed to be able to teach the Christian doctrine orally to his deaf students and that they confessed their sins orally too.

Ponce de Leon is not known to have developed a working sign language, but there is some indication from the writings of Juan Pablo Bonet — who never credited him for his method — that Ponce de Leon developed a double-handed manual alphabet which would allow a student who mastered it to spell out (letter by letter) any word. This alphabet was based, in whole or in part, on the simple hand gestures used by monks living in silence, and is said to have been formalised by Saint Bonaventure.

Ponce de Leon's work with the deaf was considered bold by contemporaries, as the prevailing opinion among most Europeans in the 16th century was that the deaf were incapable of being educated. Many laymen even believed that the deaf were too simple-minded to be eligible for salvation under Christian doctrine.

In Ponce, Puerto Rico, there is a school for deaf children named Colegio Fray Pedro Ponce de León. It is located in Urbanización La Rambla.
