= Deafness in Tunisia =

Estimates of the deaf population in Tunisia range from 40,000 to 60,000 people. These estimates indicate that deaf people make up between 0.3% to 0.5% of the population. The percent of deaf Tunisians can be much higher in isolated communities, ranging from 2% to 8%. The increase in prevalence is attributed to higher rates of intermarriage, geographic isolation, and social traditions. Tunisian Sign Language, abbreviated as TSL or LST, is the most commonly used sign language in Tunisia. As of 2008, TSL's user population is 21,000 signers.

== Language emergence ==
Tunisian Sign Language (TSL) is made up of French Sign Language, Italian Sign Language, and Arab Unified Sign Language. The French colonization of Tunisia (1881 - 1956) influenced the oral languages of the hearing community and the sign language of the deaf community, with TSL heavily borrowing from French Sign Language (LSF). The prolonged contact between the French and Tunisian communities makes it hard for researchers to determine which signs are distinctively TSL or borrowed from LSF. Although there is limited research and documentation on TSL, researchers conclude that TSL is a distinct language due to its unique lexicon of sign that symbolize Tunisian traditions, history, and customs: "despite numerous borrowings, LST includes "Tunisian" signs on which there is no way to be mistaken as to their origin because they are quite cultural signs referring to the traditions, to the history of Tunisia and the customs of deaf Tunisians." TSL has been officially recognized as a language since 2006.

== Significant organizations ==
One major organization that supports deaf people is Association Voix du Sourd de Tunisie (translated: Voice of the Deaf Association of Tunisia), or AVST. AVST is the oldest organization for the deaf in Tunisia and promotes access to healthcare, education, and employment.

Working with Dr. Amira Yaacoubi, AVST founded a hospital where medical appointments are provided in Tunisian Sign Language. The hospital is located in the most populous slum community, Djebel Lahmar, in the outskirts of Tunisia's capitol.

Manel Bergaoui, a teacher affiliated with AVST, is the first and only person to teach English to deaf/hard of hearing children through Tunisian Sign Language in the entire MENA (Middle East/North Africa) region. Frustrated with the lack of educational material for deaf/hard of hearing children, Bergaoui wrote Let's Hand Speak English (2017), the first English textbook for deaf/hard of hearing children in Tunisia and the MENA region. In 2018, Bergaoui developed an educational app "Let'sapp" for deaf Tunisians/MENA region population. Currently, Bergaoui's organization provides face-to-face and online English lessons, helping more than 10 deaf people improve their English each school year.

AVST raises awareness about the deaf community - in 2016, it produced a film in TSL, and in 2017, AVST organized the first World Deaf Day in Tunisia. In association with L'Académie Sportive et Éducative des Sourds de Tunis (translated: The Sports and Educational Academy of the Deaf of Tunis, abbreviated ASEST) and other deaf organizations, AVST holds yearly conventions where the issues and experiences of the deaf community are discussed. In 2022, AVST held an event with ASEST to discuss technological solutions for people with hearing disabilities, with TSL signers and interpreters present at the event.

During the COVID-19 pandemic, the International Foundation for Electoral Systems produced a video in Tunisian Sign Language on the risks of COVID-19 and preventative measures to keep the deaf population safe from infection. This video was shared by Tunisia's Ministry of Social Affairs on Facebook, where it has been viewed 30,000 times and shared 500 times. Other deaf organizations followed suit in sharing the video, and it was broadcast on multiple national television channels.

== Early hearing detection and intervention ==
Hearing impairment negatively affects the ability for children to develop their communication skills. The earlier hearing impairment is detected in a child, the better care they receive, leading to better language and speech development.

There is no national early detection and intervention program regarding hearing impairment in Tunisia; however, there are research studies and one-time programs that have aimed at studying the prevalence of different levels of hearing loss in Tunisian newborns and children.

At Hospital Charles Nicolle of Tunis, the neonatology department collected data from the hearing screenings of 3,260 newborns. From this study it was determined that 0.9% of the newborns had mild bilateral hearing loss, 1.5% had unilateral profound hearing loss in the right ear, and one newborn that anacusis.

Another study at Mohamed Tlatli Hospital screened for hearing impairment in 397 infants ranging from 4 days to 5 months old. All infants received the Otoacoustic Emission Test. It was determined that 9.37% of the infants had some hearing impairment. Out of these infants with some hearing impairment, 27 were given the Auditory Brainstem Response Test, in which 80% tested positively.

In Ras Djebal-Bizerte (Northern Tunisia), 304 children ranging from 4 to 6 years old received hearing screenings for the first time in their lives. The screening included a preliminary ear checkup, subjective and objective audiometric tests, otoacoustic emission test, acoustic impedance meter tests, and a speech-language assessment. 12.17% of the children had hearing impairment (33 had conductive hearing loss, two had sensorineural hearing loss, and two had mixed hearing loss). 14 children exhibited articulation disorder, 10 exhibited language delays, and five children exhibited speech delays. The children were referred to ENT specialists for proper management and care.

== Language deprivation ==
Because of the lack of hearing impairment detection programs, deaf Tunisians' language and written communication skills are very poor. 98% of deaf Tunisians are illiterate. In Arabic regions where diglossic situations are common, like Tunisia, higher rates of illiteracy occur than non-Arabic regions.

== Primary and secondary education ==
Under Article 47, the new Tunisian constitution states that children are guaranteed the right to education by their parents and the state. Furthermore, Tunisia ratified the African Charter on Human and Peoples' Rights on August 6, 1982, and is therefore legally bound to this treaty which states that education for children aged 6 – 16 is mandatory. Despite these laws in place, deaf Tunisian do not get equal access to education.

There are two educational tracks in Tunisia. The first track is mainstream schooling - the track that most children will take part in, which is overseen by the Ministry of Education. The second track of schooling is reserved for disabled children, with deaf Tunisian children falling under this category. This track is overseen by the Ministry of Social Affairs; however, the ministry has relegated this responsibility to the independent organization Association Tunisienne d'Aide aux Sourds (ATAS, translated: Tunisian Association for Aid to the Deaf). There is no governmental oversight and accountability for the education of deaf Tunisians.

In 2013, a report was published on the educational system for deaf Tunisians. The author, Dr. Marta Stroscio, compiled her findings after visiting 5 out of 70 ATAS educational centers. Stroscio stated that there was a range in the curriculum between the 5 schools. Some centers adopt a completely oralist teaching method, meaning the language of instruction is spoken and students are encouraged to improve their speaking skills if possible. Other centers use some form of sign language or Total Communication.

The educational centers were described in more detail in another report published in 2022. Primary education for deaf Tunisians consists of 6 years of specialized primary school. Disabled children from 6 to 12 years of age will attend these primary schools. Contrary to the name "specialized school", there is nothing specialized about these educational centers. Studies have reported that deaf children learn beside autistic and mentally-ill children, and the student's unique educational needs are not being met. Member of AVST Wassim ben Dhiab asserts that the lack of sign language and special need educators exacerbated the poor education that deaf Tunisians receive. In these education centers, it was noted that the classroom material was not tailored to deaf children, as they were using the same textbooks as children in the mainstream schools.

Unlike primary school, there is no two-track educational system for secondary school. In secondary school, deaf Tunisians join students in mainstream schools. The subjects in secondary school are taught in Modern Standard Arabic, Tunisian Dialect Arabic, and French, none of which languages deaf Tunisians are proficient in, since their primary education was so poor. There are a lack of sign language interpreters in this level of schooling as well.

Mona Belhouane, a partly-deaf Tunisian who is a member of Deaf Unity, states, "most [deaf children] didn't manage to reach high school level, due to the lack of adequate measures, the absence of sign language translators and the presence of communication barriers." It is encouraged that deaf students make their way from specialized centers to mainstream schools; however, deaf educational centers like El Imtiez have seen children come back from mainstream schools because they found the curriculum too hard or were dealing with the psychological effects of bullying. Only 1% - 10% of disabled children successfully integrate into main stream schools, and even fewer receive a high school diploma. This is compared to 33.9% of the general population that receive at least a high school diploma in Tunisia.

Advisor to the Minister of Education Mongi Godhbane said, "Only students with visual impairments are able to integrate into normal schools, because they know how to behave normally."

== Higher education ==
Because the primary and secondary education that deaf Tunisians receive is poor, many pursue vocational training as their tertiary education, rather than a traditional college degree. These training programs include trades such as sewing, hairdressing, and design. In the 2010 United Nations Convention on the Rights of Persons with Disabilities report on the implementation of disabled rights, the government listed only one institution that had vocational training programs specifically for deaf people. The Vocational Training Centre for the Deaf in Ksar Hellal had 43 students enrolled at the time of the report. It is known that the certificates that deaf people receive from these vocational training programs are not taken seriously by employers.

== Employment ==
The unemployment rates among deaf Tunisians are very high. The government provides incentives for businesses to hire more disabled people, one such incentive being businesses could pay disabled employees from their taxes if the business maintains that at least 1% of their employees are disabled. This incentive only applies to small to medium-sized businesses, so it is not as effective at increasing the portion of disabled people in the work force. Even with the incentive, businesses are reluctant to hire disabled people, specifically deaf people, because of their poor education. Of the small number of people with disabilities hired, most of them have visual impairments. This is because it is the easiest for people with visual impairments to integrate into the workplace. An official from the Ministry of Social Affairs has acknowledged that disabled people get paid less for the same work their colleagues complete. The government has opened accounts to provide financial aid to unemployed people with disabilities, with the revenue generated from taxing certain products and postal packages.

== Healthcare ==
Deaf people face unique barriers to accessing and receiving healthcare. One such obstacle stems from language deprivation. People who are illiterate will not be able to receive the proper health care they need. For example, they might not understand what procedures they are agreeing to, when their next appointment is scheduled, and how to properly take prescribed medication. Since 98% of Tunisia's deaf population is illiterate, they will undoubtedly face some of the problems listed above. It has also been determined that delays in the access to a sign language will limit health literacy. Using the estimates of the deaf Tunisian population and TSL signers, the percent of deaf Tunisians that use TSL ranges from 35% to 53%. Consequently, a large portion of deaf Tunisian will experience limited health literacy.

Another obstacle that deaf Tunisians face is they will not be able to directly communicate with their health care providers. Since Tunisian Sign Language is a deaf community sign (mostly only used by deaf people), it is unlikely that physicians among other health care workers are fluent in TSL. Although the proportion of Tunisian healthcare workers who are deaf could not be found, it is reasonable to assume that the proportion is incredibly small, considering most deaf Tunisians do not even receive a high school diploma.

A lack of sign language interpreters also exacerbates the language barrier. To help combat this issue, the Association Voix du Sourd de Tunisie (translated: Voice of the Deaf Association of Tunisia) worked with Dr. Amira Yaacoubi to establish a hospital where medical appointments are provided in Tunisian Sign Language. The hospital is located in the most populous slum community, Djebel Lahmar, in the outskirts of Tunisia's capitol.

In recognition of these barriers to health care, the International Foundation for Electoral Systems produced a video in Tunisian Sign Language on the risks of COVID-19 and preventative measures to keep the deaf population safe from infection. This video was shared by Tunisia's Ministry of Social Affairs on Facebook, where it has been viewed 30,000 times and shared 500 times. Other deaf organizations followed suit in sharing the video, and it was broadcast on multiple national television channels.

== Language preservation and revitalization ==
According to the World Federation of the Deaf, the 2008 estimate of the population of Tunisian Sign Language users was 21,200 people; this was classified as a medium-sized speaker population. TSL usage is scattered around Tunisia, but it is most prevalent in Tunis and Sfax, the two most populous cities in Tunisia. According to Ethnologue, TSL is a deaf community sign, and its language status has been classified as 5 (developing) on the Expanded Graded Intergenerational Disruption Scale. Languages with this status are "in vigorous use, with literature in a standardized form being used by some, though this is not yet widespread or sustainable." TSL's vitality, or how much the language is used as means of communication, has been described as stable. There are 70 educational centers in Tunisia that deaf Tunisian children can attend, and some centers teach the students TSL, while others do not, so TSL is being passed down to at least a portion of the younger generations.

== See also ==
- Deafness in Benin
- Deafness in the Democratic Republic of the Congo
- Deafness in Egypt
- History of deaf education in Africa
