= Tunisian Sign Language =

Deaf sign language of Tunisia

- Native to: Tunisia
- Native speakers: 21,000 (2008)
- Language family: French Sign: Italian Sign; Tunisian Sign Language

Language codes
- ISO 639-3: tse
- Glottolog: tuni1249

Tunisian Sign Language (Arabic: لغة الإشارة التونسية, romanized: Lughat al-Ishārah al-Tūnisīyah; French: Langue des signes tunisienne) is the sign language used by deaf people in Tunisia. It derives from Italian Sign Language, mixed with indigenous sign.

It is not clear how the language of the Burj as-Salh deaf village relates to indigenous sign and TSL.

== See also ==
- Deafness in Tunisia
