= List of hospitals in the Democratic Republic of the Congo =

The following is a list of hospitals in the Democratic Republic of the Congo.

== Kinshasa ==
- HJ Hospitals (private)
- General Hospital of Kinshasa (public) (former Maman Yemo Hospital)
- Cliniques Universitaires de Kinshasa (public)
- L'hôpital du Cinquantenaire
- Clinique Ngaliema (public)
- Saint Josutrutreph Hospital (non profit/diocesan)
- Biamba Marie Mutombo Hospital (private)
- Nganda Hospital (private)
- Monkole Mother & Child Hospital (non-profit)
- Centre Medical de Kinshasa (private)
- Centre Medical Phenix (private)
- Bondeko Clinic (private)
- D.H.K : De Smet Hospital of Kinsuka (private)
- CLOP Clinique Oncologique du Pasteur (private)

== Goma ==
- General Hospital of Goma/Hopital Provincial du Nord Kivu (public)
- Heal Africa Hospital (private)
- CBCA Virunga Hospital (non profit/ Protestant)
- CIMAK Hospital (private)
- Kyeshero Hospital (non profit/ Protestant),
- Goma Sanru Hospital (non profit/Protestant)
- Charité Maternelle Hospital,
- CBCA Ndosho Hospital,
- Skyborne Hospital/Goma,
- Centre Medical Alanine
- Centre Medical GESOM
- Centre Hospitalier La Providence.
- CLOIC Clinique Oncologique Integrative du Congo

== Uvira Territory ==
- Lemera Hospital
- Hospital General of Reference D'uvira

== Kisantu ==
- Saint Luke Hospital (non profit/diocesan)

== Kimpese ==
- Kimpese Sanru Hospital (non profit/Protestant)
