= Lloyd Howard Perkins =

American Mormon bishop (1923–1999)

Lloyd Howard Perkins (October 6, 1923 – September 4, 1999) was the first deaf Bishop in the history of the Church of Jesus Christ of Latter-day Saints.

== Biography ==
He was born in Ogden, Utah, to James Emery Perkins and Lila Luella Bess Perkins. He served as a Stake Missionary in Scottsdale, Arizona, and held many positions in the Church. He served on the High Council in the Salt Lake Park Stake. In his later years, despite poor health, he completed a mission with his wife in the Norway Oslo Mission. He lost his ability to hear due to spinal meningitis. He married Vynola Dean Kernell on June 6, 1946, and later divorced. He married Madelaine Peterson Burton on December 27, 1976.

He did more than serve as the first deaf Bishop for the first deaf ward in the history of the LDS Church. He gave credence to a Utah subculture. "Having their own ward meant that deaf people were able to be recognized as having their own language," said Perkins' son.

== Public life ==
He influenced the passage of the Americans with Disabilities Act. He served on the Governor's Committee to educate others about the act and to fight for total communication teaching in Utah's schools.

"In the 1960s, there was a big fight between all those educators who wanted only lip-reading taught in schools-no sign language. He believed they should teach total communication, or both sign language and lip reading. He led the fight for it," Kerry Perkins said

In 1975, Perkins donated a Teletype machine to the Salt Lake Police Department. It enabled deaf families with a similar unit to call the department when they needed help.
