= Christian Mission for the Deaf =

Non-profit organization

Christian Mission for the Deaf (CMD) is a non-profit Christian organization whose goal is the bring communication, literacy, and spirituality to deaf Africans.

== History ==
The organization, originally known as Christian Mission for Deaf Africans, was founded in 1956 by Andrew Foster. Prior to Andrew Foster's arrival in Africa there were almost no schools for the deaf, save a few in South Africa and Egypt.

CMD was "incorporated as a Michigan non-profit organization in 1956" and received tax-exempt status in 1958.

Within 30 years Andrew Foster's mission had opened a total of 31 schools and ministries for the deaf across Africa in: Ghana, Nigeria, Ivory Coast, Togo, Chad, Senegal, Benin, Cameroon, Central African Republic, Zaire (now the Democratic Republic of Congo), Burkina Faso, Burundi, Gabon, Kenya, Sierra Leone, Congo and Guinea. The organization aimed to open schools and ministries for the deaf and then to turn them over to others, either the national government or evangelical churches. Some have closed due to civil war and tribal unrest.

For much of the founder's life, he spent six months in Africa establishing deaf schools and six months of each year in the United States raising funding for their support.

Following the death of the founder in 1987, the organization was led for several years by his wife, Berta, who had served alongside him for years. Following her death and to the present, their son Timothy Foster has served as director.

== Work ==
The organization currently supports six deaf schools in Nigeria, Chad, and the Democratic Republic of Congo, and two ministry centers in Nigeria and Chad. The deaf schools established by CMD make use of all communication methods, i.e. "natural gestures, formal sign language, finger-spelling, writing, reading, speech, lip-reading and hearing aids". So as to make every effort to build a foundation for literacy and access to the Bible. These schools introduced American Sign Language (ASL), combining it with the indigenous Adamorobe Sign Language and spoken French, resulting in the 'Langue des Signes Franco-Africaine', variations of which are now used in many deaf schools in Africa.

CMD also provides some basic job training.
