= Andrew Foster (educator) =

American pioneer of deaf education (1925–1987)

Andrew Jackson Foster
- Born: June 27, 1925; Ensley, Alabama
- Died: December 3, 1987 (aged 62); Rwanda
- Occupation: Teacher
- Known for: Pioneer of deaf education in Africa

Andrew Jackson Foster (June 27, 1925 – December 3, 1987) was an American pioneer of deaf education in several countries in Africa. In 1954, he became the first Deaf African American to earn a bachelor's degree from Gallaudet University, the American university for the Deaf, and the first to earn a master's degree from Eastern Michigan University. He earned a second master's degree from Seattle Pacific Christian College (now Seattle Pacific University), also in education. He founded Christian Mission for the Deaf African in 1956 and set out for Accra, Ghana, where he established the first school for the deaf in West Africa.

== Early life and education ==
Andrew Foster was born on June 27, 1925, in the small mining town of Ensley, Alabama. In 1936, when Andrew was about 11 years old, both he and his brother contracted spinal meningitis and subsequently became deaf. Following this, Foster was sent to the Alabama School for Colored Deaf in Talladega, where he received up to a sixth grade education. This was largely due to racial segregation still being in effect in Alabama, with Jim Crow laws established that did not allow African Americans to receive more than a sixth grade education. In order to continue his education, Foster moved to Flint, Michigan in 1942, where he lived with his aunt and attended the Michigan School for the Deaf where was able to receive an eighth grade education. He took his high school courses through American Correspondence School while also working in auto factories and restaurants, and attending Detroit Institute of Commerce, where he learned bookkeeping and business administration.

After the war ended, Foster was encouraged by Eric Malzkuhn, a professor at Gallaudet University, to continue his education by applying there. However, he was rejected several times on account of his race. In 1950, he received a diploma in accountancy and business administration from the Detroit Institute of Commerce, followed by a high school diploma from the American School in Chicago in 1951. It was only after this that Foster was accepted to Gallaudet University with a full scholarship. He was the first African American to attend America's Deaf university, graduating in 1954 at the age of 29 with a degree in education. He later went on to receive two master's degrees: one in education from Eastern Michigan University in 1955, and one in Christian Mission from Seattle Pacific Christian College in 1956. In 1970, Gallaudet University awarded him an honorary doctorate in honor of his contributions to the education of the deaf in Africa.

== Contributions to Deaf education in Africa ==
Foster had felt a calling to be a missionary since he heard a Jamaican missionary at a Sunday school class at Bethany Pembroke, his aunt's church, when he lived with her in Flint, MI. During his time at Gallaudet, he often visited Washington D.C.'s inner-city neighborhoods, where he would seek out young deaf African American children to serve as a prominent role model in their lives. Through this work, Foster realized his passion for giving black deaf people access to communication, education, and the Gospel. In 1956, upon learning that there were only 12 deaf schools in the whole continent of Africa, and those only in Egypt and South Africa, Foster established the Christian Mission for Deaf Africans (now called the Christian Mission for the Deaf), a missionary organization whose goal was to bring education to every deaf African. He began his work in 1956 by convincing school officials to let him use their classrooms after hours to teach the deaf.

After going on a series of speaking tours around America to raise funds for his cause, Foster arrived in the capital of newly independent Ghana in 1957. Prior to Foster's mission, there were no records of any programs, schools or teachers for deaf Ghanaians—there was not even a record of a formal signed language before he arrived, although there seem to have been village sign languages. In his initial missionary trip, Foster discovered that the treatment of deaf people in Ghanaian culture (as with disability in general) was so oppressive that parents often hid their deaf children at home or abandoned them altogether. He found a public school in Accra willing to allow him to use their facility after hours, and after some months 53 deaf people joined Foster's makeshift program. This became the Ghana Mission School for the Deaf, the first school for the deaf in West Africa. Foster acted as its director until 1965, expanding the size of the school and training teachers. By the end of Foster's time directing this school, there were 113 students in attendance, with a waiting list of over 300. As the deaf began to become literate, Foster would supplement their education with trade skills and the Gospel. Foster also convinced existing churches and missions to expand their ministry to include the deaf.

The Ghana Mission School for the Deaf was not the only school Foster established. In 1960, the Ibadan Mission School for the Deaf, the first Deaf school in Nigeria, was established, followed by two other schools in Enugu and Kaduna. Overall, Foster established 32 churches and mission schools for the Deaf in thirteen nations across Africa. Specifically, he was able to establish schools in Ghana, Nigeria, Côte d'Ivoire, Togo, Chad, Senegal, Benin Republic, Cameroon, Central African Republic, Congo Democratic Republic, Burkina Faso, Burundi, and Gabon. He established churches for the Deaf in Kenya, Sierra Leone, Congo and Guinea. He also established a training center in Ghana, which eliminated the need to train teachers overseas and instead promoted local staffing of schools for the Deaf.

== Personal life and death ==
In 1961, Foster married Berta Zuther, who was also deaf. The couple had met at the Third World Congress of the Deaf in Wiesbaden, Germany, in 1959. Together, they raised five children—Andrew, John, Tim, Dan, and Faith in Ibadan, Nigeria. Foster continued doing fundraising and speaking tours, as well as missionary work, around the world in the latter half of his life. In addition, he established and taught teacher-training courses in both English and French in several countries worldwide.

Andrew Foster died on December 3, 1987, after accepting an empty seat in a chartered Cessna airplane going to Kenya that lost altitude and crashed near Gisenyi, Rwanda, killing all those aboard. On January 26, 1988, old friends and coworkers gathered at Gallaudet's Chapel Hall to celebrate and pay tribute to Foster's life. It was at this service that the National Black Deaf Advocates established an annual memorial award in Foster's name. There were also representatives of the "second generation" of Foster's students at Gallaudet in attendance.

== Legacy ==
Foster's work establishing 32 schools in 13 African countries led to the governments in Ghana and Nigeria adopting and replicating his school systems on a nationwide scale. Additionally, Foster trained a group of deaf Nigerians to run his mission schools in the country. This group of people were coined the Deaf Nigerian Pioneers, and were recorded to have worked to sustain and enhance the Deaf education system throughout Africa. It must also be noted that Foster's dedication to teaching a signed language encouraged previously running deaf schools in Africa, such as the Wesley School for the Deaf, to adopt similar methods. Ultimately, Foster's work allowed for the use of sign language to grow throughout Africa, increasing opportunities for children throughout the continent.

Foster also changed the lives of many students, who have gone on to further improve education for special students in their countries. It was due to Foster's efforts that Gallaudet began welcoming students from Foster's schools in Africa. One student of many whose lives were changed by Foster is Seth Tetteh-Ocloo, a student at the Ghana Mission School for the Deaf who followed Foster to Gallaudet after completing his high school education. He went on to earn a master's degree in education from Gallaudet in 1965, as well as doctorates in educational psychology and rehabilitation from Southern Illinois University. He returned to Ghana to work as a rehabilitation officer for the country, and also founded Ghana's second school for the Deaf.

As a result of Foster's efforts, Gallaudet University began accepting students from his schools in Africa, all of which have gone to graduate from University. Because of Andrew Foster's work bringing language and education to Africa, he is considered the "Father of Deaf Education in Africa" amongst members of the Deaf community.

== Awards ==
- 1962 - Received the Man of the Year award from Alpha Sigma Pi.
- 1970 - Gallaudet granted Andrew Foster an honorary Doctor of Humane Letters in recognition of his accomplishments, making him the first black person to receive such a degree from the university.
- 1975 - Received the Edward Miner Gallaudet Award from their alumni association
- 1981 - Received the Alumni Honor Award from Eastern Michigan University
- 1982 - Received the SPU 1982 alumni The Medallion Award in recognition of his work
- 2004 - Gallaudet University dedicated an auditorium in Andrew Foster's name, calling him the "Father of Deaf Education in Africa".

== Media ==
Deaf Mosaic segment - Episode #404 of the Gallaudet University-produced Deaf Mosaic had a tribute to Andrew Foster.

- Described and Captioned Media Program registration required, physical loan for classroom setting.
- Gallaudet University Video Library Catalog, online viewing available.

== See also ==
- Education in Africa
- Deafness for a comparison of the medical, disability and cultural models of deafness.
- Deaf culture
- American Sign Language

== Relevant literature ==
- Runnels, Joel Benjamin. Dr. Andrew Foster’s Contributions to Deaf Education in Africa, the Ghana Years (1957–1965). The University of North Dakota, doctoral dissertation, 2020.Dissertation download
